= Indian campaign of Ahmad Shah Durrani =

1748–1769 Afghan invasions in India

- Part of the Decline of the Mughal Empire and Campaigns of Ahmad Shah Durrani
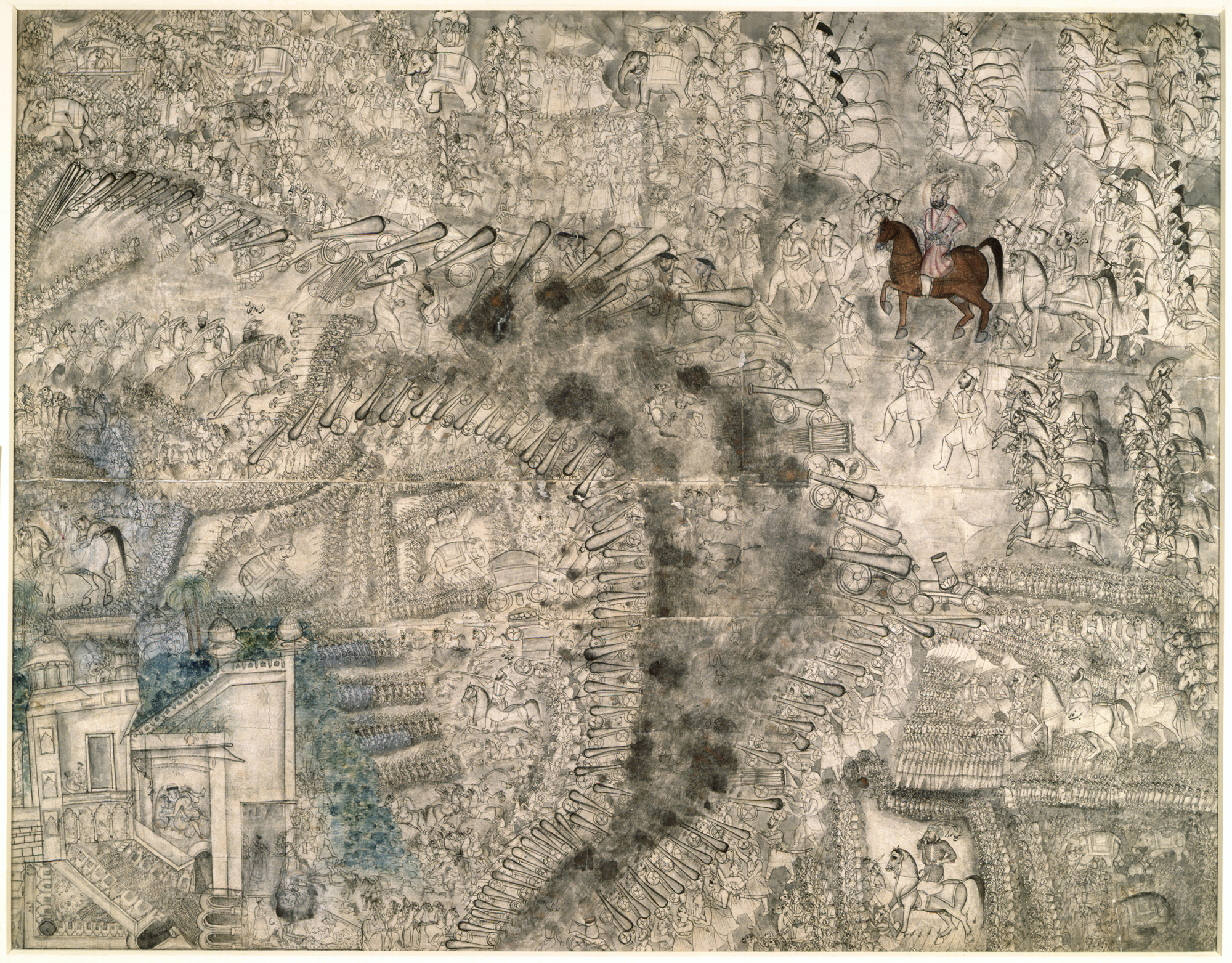
- A headless Baba Deep Singh fighting the Afghan forces at the Battle of Amritsar Faizabad-style painting of the Third Battle of Panipat Jassa Singh Ahluwalia entering Lahore after the successful Siege of Lahore
Date
Location
11 January 1748 – June 1770
- Punjab
- Haryana
- Himachal Pradesh
- Delhi
- Sindh
- Balochistan
- Kashmir

Belligerents
Afghan Empire; Rohilkhand; Kalat; Oudh; Farrukhabad; Kumaon; Sindh	Mughal Empire: Lahore; Multan; Delhi; Agra; Kashmir; Maratha Empire: Peshwa's Dominion; Baroda; Gwalior; Indore; Kolhapur; Nagpur; Jhansi; Jath; Sikh Confederacy: Phulkian Misl; Patiala (from 1762); Jind (from 1763); Ahluwalia Misl; Bhangi Misl; Kanhaiya Misl; Ramgarhia Misl; Singhpuria Misl; Panjgarhia Misl; Kalsia (from 1763); Nishanwalia Misl; Sukerchakia Misl; Dallewalia Misl; Nakai Misl; Shaheedan Misl; Other states: Bharatpur Jaipur Bhopal Udaipur Garhwal Kashmir Amarkot Junagadh Kurwai Kutch Jhang

Commanders and leaders
Ahmad Durrani Afghan officers: Timur Durrani Ali Khakwani (executed) Najabat Khan † Zain Sirhindi † Wali Khan Abdus Khan Zaman Niazi; Allied officers: Abdullah Khan Saadullah Khan Najib ad-Dawlah Mian Shah (executed) Hafiz Barech Faizullah Khan Zabita Khan Dunde Barech Mirza Bakht Mir Nasir Khan I Mahmud Khan I Safdar Jang # Shuja-ud-Daula Najaf Khan Bahadur Tanoli Suba Tanoli Mir Tanoli Ahmad Bangash Deep Chand Noor Kalhoro # Muhammad Khan Mian Kalhoro	Muhammad Shah # Ahmad Bahadur; Alamgir II X Shah Jahan III; Shah Alam II Mughal officers: Itimad-ad-Daula † Intizam-ud-Daulah X Feroze Jung III Adina Khan # Hayatullah Khan Moin-ul-Mulk Momin Khan Kaura Mal †; Shahu I # Rajaram II Maratha officers: Balaji Rao # Madhavrao I Sadashivrao Bhau † Damaji Gaekwad Jayappaji Scindia X Jankoji Scindia † Dattaji Scindia (executed) Kadarjj Scindia Manaji Scindia Malhar Holkar # Khanderao Holkar † Male Holkar Sambhaji I Shivaji II Raghuji I # Janoji I Naro Shanker Madhav Kakirde Babulal Kanahai Vishwas Laxman Yesu Bai Yeshwant Rao Amrit Rao I; Kapur Singh # Jassa Singh (WIA) Sikh officers: Ala Singh # Gajpat Singh Hari Singh † Jhanda Singh Jai Singh Jassa Singh Khushal Singh Karora Singh Baghel Singh Gurbakhsh Singh Dasaundha Singh † Naud Singh Charat Singh Gulab Singh † Tara Singh Heera Singh † Deep Singh † Naina Singh; Other officers: Badan Singh # Suraj Mal † Jawahar Singh Ishwari Singh Madho Singh I Faiz Khan Pratap Singh II Raj Singh II Ari Singh II Pradip Shah Sukh Mal (executed) Rana Singh Bahadur Khanji Mahabat Khanji Muzaffar Khanji Izzat Khan Lakhpatji # Godji II Inayatullah Sial

The Indian campaign of Ahmad Shah Durrani (1748–1769) was a series of invasions by the Afghan Emperor, Ahmad Shah Durrani against the declining Mughal Empire, the Maratha Empire, Sikh Confederacy, and numerous other Indian kingdoms. The primary basis of the invasions originated after the political independence of the Afghan Empire following the end of the Naderian Wars and persisted until Durrani's last invasion in 1769. The campaign is categorised into three wars: Afghan–Mughal War, Afghan–Maratha War, Afghan–Sikh War, and an array of local conflicts aimed at the subjugation of politically independent states such as Kalat and Kashmir.

Ahmad Shah led a total of nine invasions into India between 1748 and 1769. His objectives were met through the raids (taking the wealth and destroying sacred places belonging to the Indians) and deepening the political crisis in India. Of the invasions, the most significant attacks were in 1757 and 1761; sacking the city of Delhi in 1757, and defeating the Maratha confederacy at the decisive Third Battle of Panipat. His later invasions focused on conflicts with the Sikhs and stability of Durrani domains in Punjab.

== Objectives of his Indian invasions ==
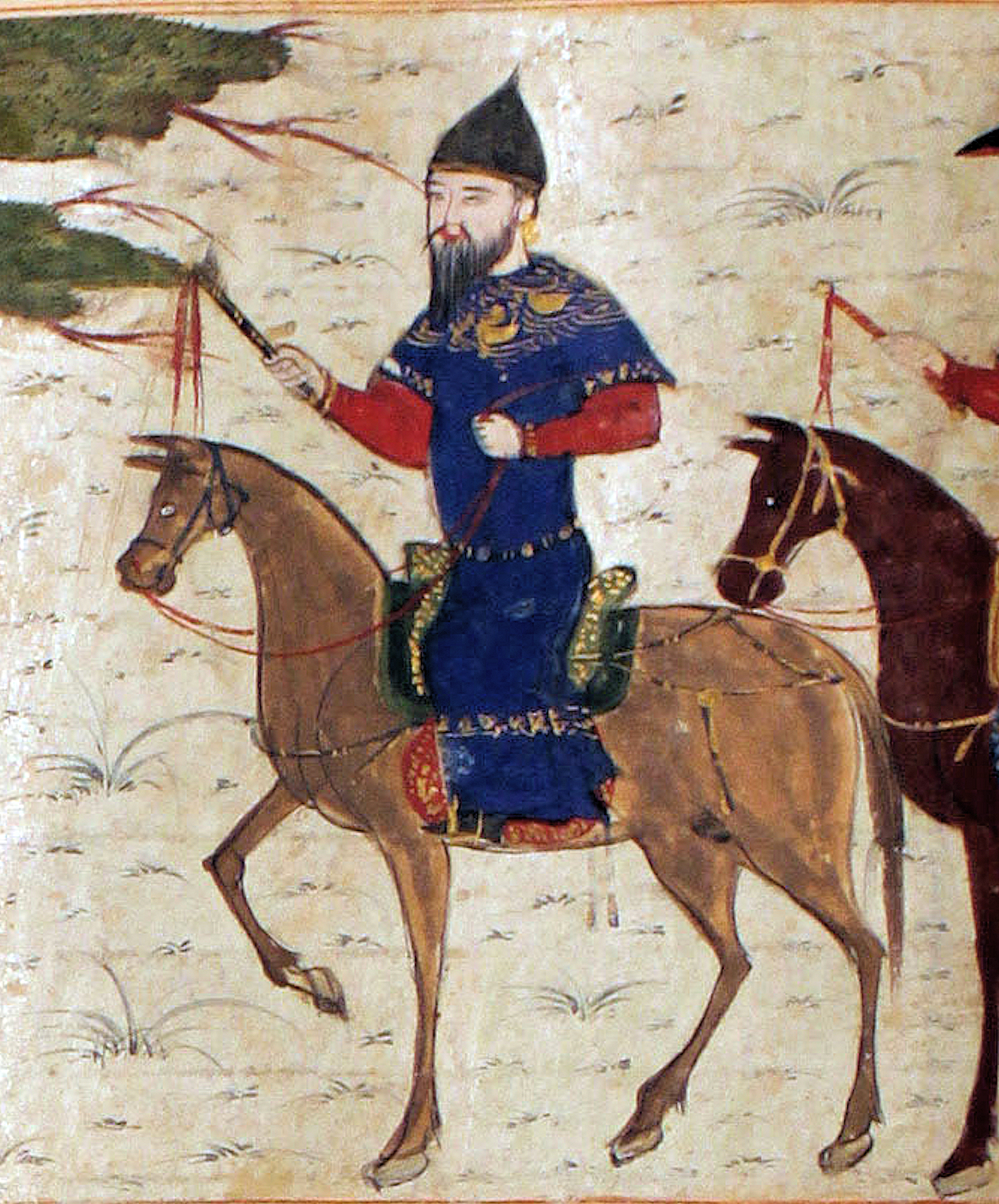
Depiction of Mahmud of Ghazni. Ahmad Shah is typically compared with him, with Mahmud himself having launched over 17 invasions of India

Afghanistan was a relatively poor country. As a result, Ahmad Shah, following in the footsteps of conquerors before him such as Mahmud of Ghazni, invaded India to plunder and obtain wealth. Relating as well from Muhammad of Ghor, Ahmad Shah invaded India to also establish his own political dominance, as the power vacuum following the decline of the Mughal Empire allowed him to repeat extensive campaigns, while also reviving the prominence of Afghans in India. Furthermore, by institutionalizing the casus belli of holy war, Ahmad Shah was able to direct the majority of his campaigns toward India.

Moreover, Ahmad Shah saw invasions as the proper way to propagate his strength. The Afghan chiefs and nobility initially saw him as an upstart, and as a result, Ahmad Shah sought victories to legitimize himself.

== First Invasion (1747–1748) ==
=== Civil War in Lahore (1745–1747) ===
Following the death of Zakariya Khan the governor of Lahore in July 1745, the Mughal Wazier Qamaruddin Khan would appoint the two sons of Zakariya Khan as the governors of Lahore and Multan.Yahya Khan the son of Zakariya Khan was appointed governor of Lahore, and Shah Nawaz was appointed governor of Multan. Yahya Khan's administration over Lahore would soon be challenged by his brother Shah Nawaz, who soon arrived in Lahore on November 1746. Shah Nawaz demanded a complete division of their dead father's property.This dispute over Zakariya Khan's estate resulted in a war between the two brothers and their armies which lasted from November 1746 to March 1747.

On 17 March 1747, Shah Nawaz was able to defeat Yahya Khan and had held him in captivity. Shah Nawaz usurped the governorship over Lahore and appointed Kaura Mal as his diwan and recognized Adina Beg Khan as faujdar of the Jalandhar Doaba. Shah Nawaz began negotiating with the Delhi government to recognize his governorship over the province, and used his captive brother as a bargaining tool. However instead the Mughal emperor Muhammad Shah threatened direct military action against Shah Nawaz. Yahya Khan was also able to escape from Shah Nawaz's captivity and fled towards Delhi. Shah Nawaz soon began looking for foreign help. Shah Nawaz had heard of the military exploits of Ahmad Shah Durrani who had just taken Kabul and Peshawar from the Mughal governor Nasir Khan. After being advised by Adina Beg Khan, Shah Nawaz decided to invite Ahmed Shah for Military help. Ahmed Shah agreed to the request on the condition that Shah Nawaz accept Afghan suzerainty, and he soon began his invasion from Peshawar in December 1747.

=== Battle of Lahore (1748) ===
Adina Beg soon informed the Delhi government of Shah Nawaz's treachery. Qamaruddin Khan was disappointed at hearing the news and soon wrote a letter to Shah Nawaz. In this letter Qamaruddin Khan agreed to recognize Shah Nawaz's control over Lahore on the condition that he oppose Ahmad Shah's forces.Shah Nawaz agreed to the wazir's request and he now turned hostile towards the Afghans. Jahan Khan had crossed the Indus river with 8,000 of his men. Shah Nawaz fought the Afghan force and forced Jahan Khan to retreat towards Peshawar, where Jahan Khan waited for Ahmad Shah's forces to arrive. Ahmad Shah entered the Punjab and occupied the fort of Rohtas. When he heard news of Shah Nawaz changing his allegiance to the Mughals, he sent Sabir Shah and Muhammad Yar Khan to Lahore. However Shah Nawaz felt insulted by the remarks made by Sabir Shah and ordered him to be executed, while Muhammad Yar Khan was let go. Hearing news of Sabir Shah's execution, Ahmad Shah began his march towards the city of Lahore. He also confirmed the holdings of Rawalpindi to Muqarrab Khan a Gakkhar chief during Ahmad Shah's journey towards Gujrat.

Ahmad Shah Durrani had around 18,000 Afghan soldiers under his command, one third of which were from his own tribe. Durrani's army however lacked any artillery and was much smaller compared to the Mughals. Shah Nawaz had around 70,000 Soldiers under his command along with artillery. On 10 January 1748, Durrani and his army camped near the Shalamar gardens. The Afghan and Mughal Forces would fight one another on 11 January 1748.

Khwajah Asmatullah Khan, one of the Mughal commanders, had around 10,000 cavalry and 5,000 Musketeers, while Lachin beg another commander had around 5,000 soldiers. According to Historian Sir Jadhunath Sarkar, Asmatullah and Lachin Beg had around 16,000 soldiers under their command. Shah Nawaz sent Jalhe Khan, a Pashtun commander from Kasur, to oppose Durrani's forces. However instead Jalhe Khan defected to the Afghan side and Joined Ahmad Shah Durrani. Ahmad Shah sent 1,000 of his musketeers to fire upon the Mughal forces and to retreat beyond the enemies range. Shah Nawaz soon consulted a astrologer to know the result of the battle.The astrologer told Shah Nawaz that there should not be any fighting that day and to instead attack the Afghans the next day. Shah Nawaz agreed to this advice and told his officers Adina Beg and Diwan Kaura mal not to move out and oppose the Afghan forces and to only fight the Afghans within the Mughal entrenchments.

Ahmad Shah was able to overpower the Qizilbash soldiers of the Mughal army and began pursuing them into their entrenchments. Asmatullah Khan began calling in for reinforcements.Adina Beg failed in properly reinforcing Asmatullah and Adina Beg soon fled towards Lahore. Some of the Mughal soldiers took this as a sign of a ceasefire, and retreated to their trenches in complete disorder. The Afghans now launched a full-scale attack on the Mughal forces which forced Asmatullah Khan to retreat. The various guns and artillery that was stored in the fort of Hazrat Ishan fell in the hands of the Afghan forces. Adina Beg fired cannons and rockets onto the Afghan forces, however the Afghans were able to overpower the resistance offered by the Mughals. Shah Nawaz escaped Lahore and fled towards Delhi. Asmatullah Khan was killed during the battle.

Ahmad Shah Durrani and the Afghan forces entered Lahore on 12 January 1748. The previous members of the Lahore government that had been imprisoned by Shah Nawaz were released by the Afghans. Mir Momin Khan, Lakhpath Rai and Surat Singh all pleaded to Durrani to spare the city from plunder and paid a ransom to the Afghans. Ahmad Shah accepted the ransom and ordered his officers to make sure the Afghan soldiers wouldn't subject the city to plunder. Despite this, some parts of the city were looted by the Afghan forces. Various Guns, artillery, treasure and other goods all fell in the hands of the Afghan forces following their conquest of Lahore. Coins were also minted in the name of Ahmad Shah Durrani. Thousands of Women and Children were enslaved by the Afghans after their conquest of Lahore. The Afghans also conscripted thousands of Punjabis into the Afghan army. Ahmad Shah appointed Jalhe Khan of Kasur as the new governor of Lahore, with Mir Momin Khan as his deputy and Lakhpath Rai as his Diwan. Ahmad Shah stayed in the city of Lahore for 5 weeks and began his plans to advance towards Delhi.

=== Battle of Manupur ===
Durrani attacked India in 1748. He had faced Mughal, Rajput and Sikh coalitions in Sirhind, Ahmad Shah's Afghan troops swept aside the Mughal army's left flank (of Rajput stock) and raided their baggage train but a fire beginning in a captured rocket cart went on to ignite the Durrani artillery store, roasting thousands of soldiers alive and forcing Ahmad Shah Durrani's retreat. After the retreat of Durrani, Sikh bands under Charat Singh continued to harass them as they retreated to Kabul. he had to return home in failure. He lost to the Mughal soldiers, Rajput force's and Sikhs of the Phulkian Misl (also known as the Patiala State).

== Second invasion (1748) ==
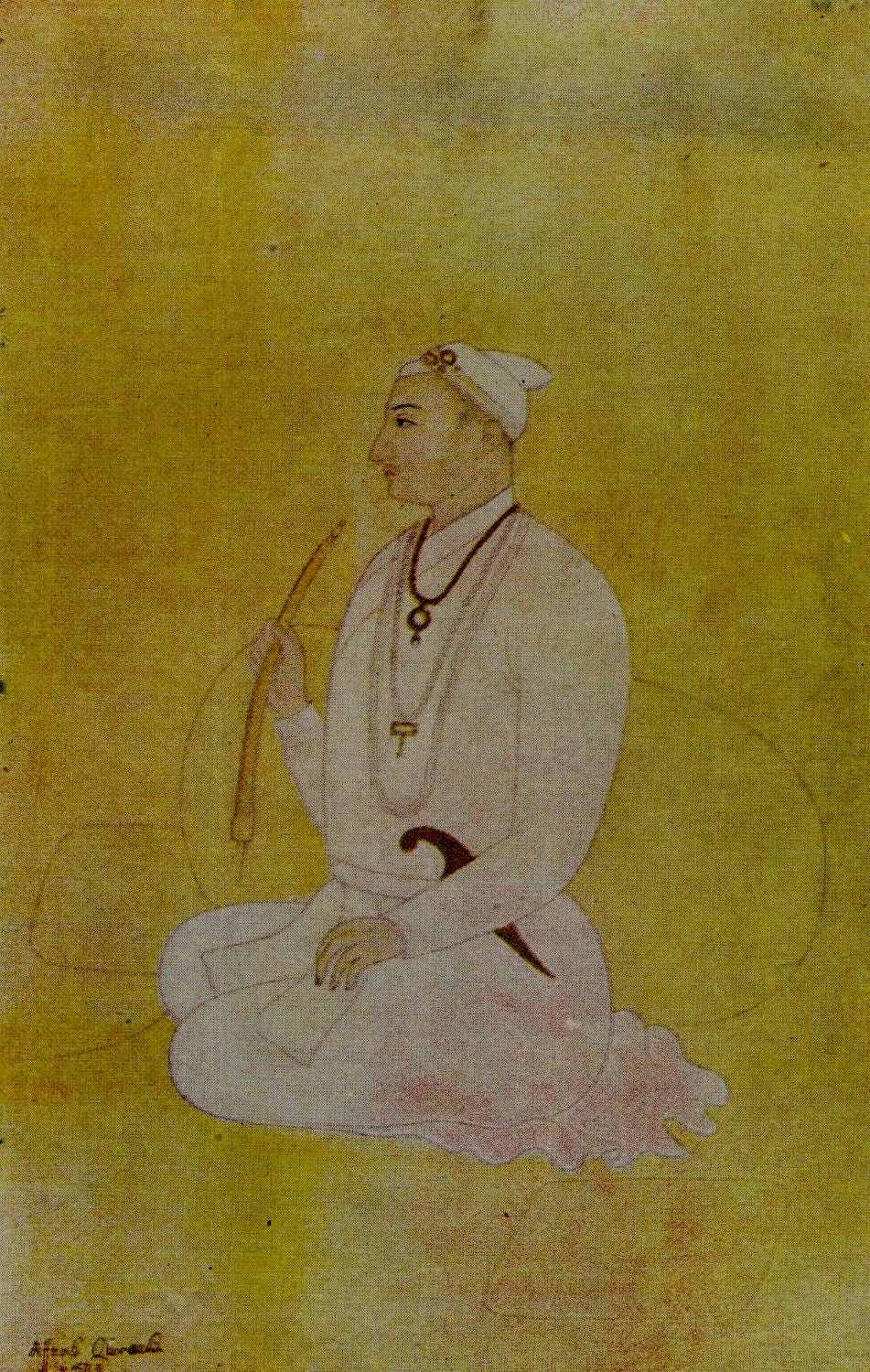
Portrait of Moin-ul-Mulk, the Mughal governor of the Punjab (r.1748–1753)

In November 1748, Ahmad Shah began his second invasion of India. Moin-ul-Mulk, the new governor of the Punjab, urgently requested reinforcement from the Mughals in Delhi. Moin-ul-Mulk, wishing to not fight the Afghans on open plains, remained on the defensive at Sodhra, as an ongoing power struggle with the former Mughal governor of Kabul, Nasir Khan, threatened his position. As a result, Jahan Khan was able to raid the countryside, including the Chaj Doab, whilst a party of Sikhs raided Lahore.

Ahmad Shah advanced to Kopra, and engaged in skirmishes with Moin-ul-Mulk's army. Overwhelmed with the rising power of the Sikhs and the Afghan invasion, Moin-ul-Mulk opened negotiation, ceding the revenues of Gujrat, Aurangabad, Sialkot, and Pasrur, which all amounted to revenues worth 1.4 million rupees yearly. Ahmad Shah returned to Afghanistan following the treaty, crossing through Peshawar, Dera Ismail Khan, and Dera Ghazi Khan. The regions of Dera Ismail Khan and Dera Ghazi Khan fell as he returned to Afghanistan, confirming the former tribal chiefs as governors in the region under his suzerainty.

== Third Invasion (1751–1752) ==
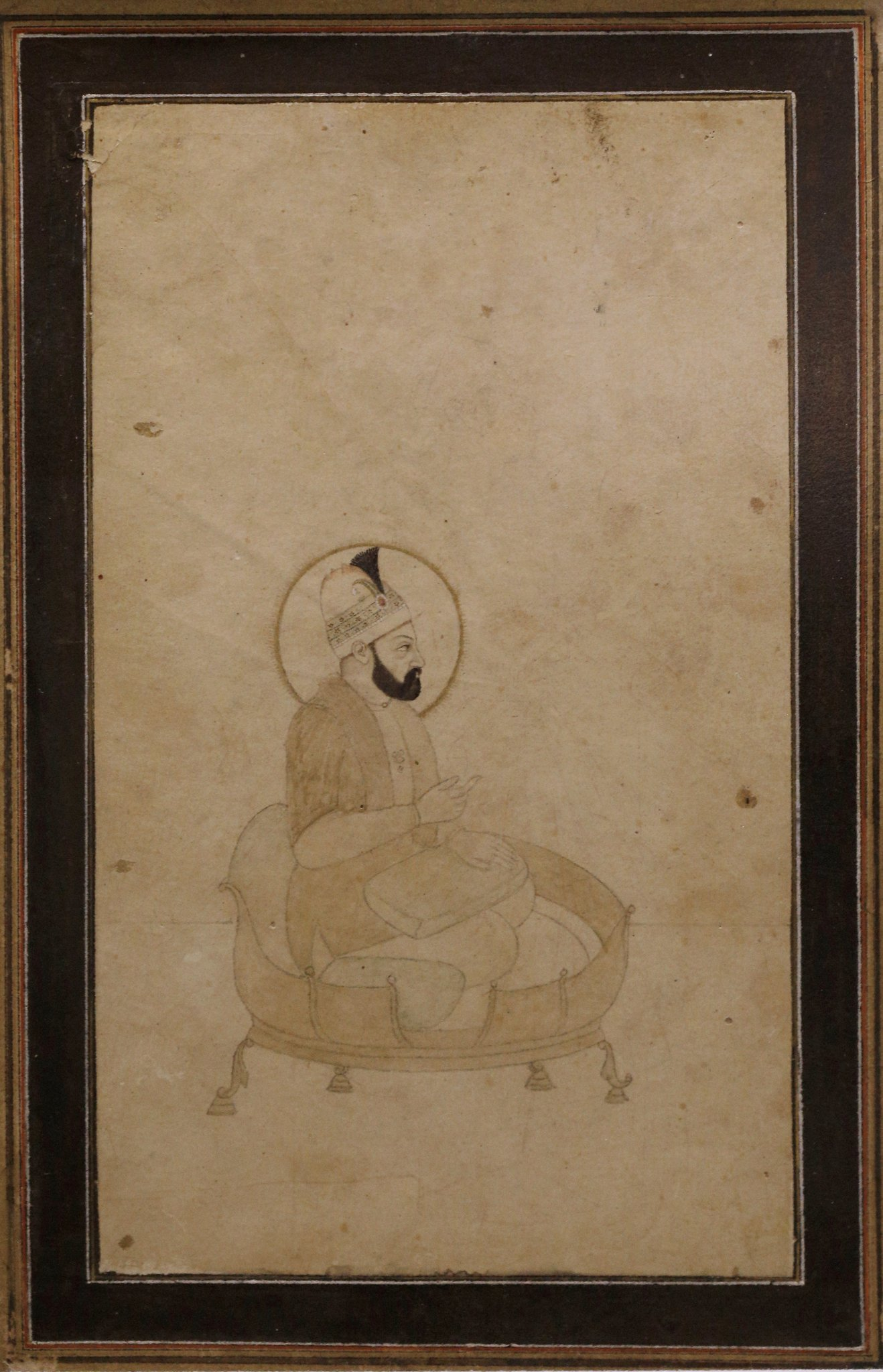
Painting of Ahmad Shah Abdali kept in the Lahore Museum, c. 1755

Possibly due to Ahmad Shah's struggle in Khorasan, Moin-ul-Mulk failed to pay the agreed tribute to Ahmad Shah from his second invasion on the revenues of Gujrat, Aurangabad, Sialkot, and Pasrur. Inducing Ahmad Shah to invade again, he began in November 1751, leading his forces to invade the Punjab. Moin-ul-Mulk immediately sent 900,000 rupees forward as tribute, which Ahmad Shah seized and continued his march. With the advance guard under Jahan Khan, Ahmad Shah led his forces through Rohtas, Gujrat, and Shahdara. Jahan Khan's forces pillaged the countryside while skirmishes began with Moin-ul-Mulk, who raised his own force to meet the Afghans in battle. The advance of Ahmad Shah triggered mass panic in Lahore, with many fleeing to Delhi or Jammu for safety.

In January 1752, Ahmad Shah forded the Ravi in secrecy at Ghazipur, before advancing on Lahore. Jahan Khan began advancing on Lahore as well, initially being driven out of Faiz Bagh, and instead establishing himself at the Shalimar gardens. Moin-ul-Mulk immediately dashed back to Lahore, to which the Afghans laid siege for over four months. Receiving no aid from the Mughals, or any other nobles, Moin-ul-Mulk settled for a pitched battle with the Afghans outside of Lahore.

On 6 March, after a fierce battle, Moin-ul-Mulk was defeated and surrendered to Ahmad Shah, who received him in person. Impressed by the efforts of Moin-ul-Mulk in his resistance, Ahmad Shah instated him as the governor of Lahore under his suzerainty. Lahore was however, plundered and slaughtered. Following this, Ahmad Shah drafted a peace treaty with Moin-ul-Mulk, officiating the annexation of the Punjab including Multan and Lahore, and as far as Sirhind to the Durrani Empire. The Mughal emperor Bahadur Shah signed the treaty on 3 April 1752, ending Mughal rule in the Punjab.

Having conquered the Punjab, Ahmad Shah also dispatched his general, Shah Pasand Khan, with 15,000 men to Kashmir, which was embroiled in civil war. Supporting the deposed governor, Mir Muqim, Afghan forces quickly occupied Srinagar and established complete control in the province.

== Fourth Invasion (1756–1757) ==
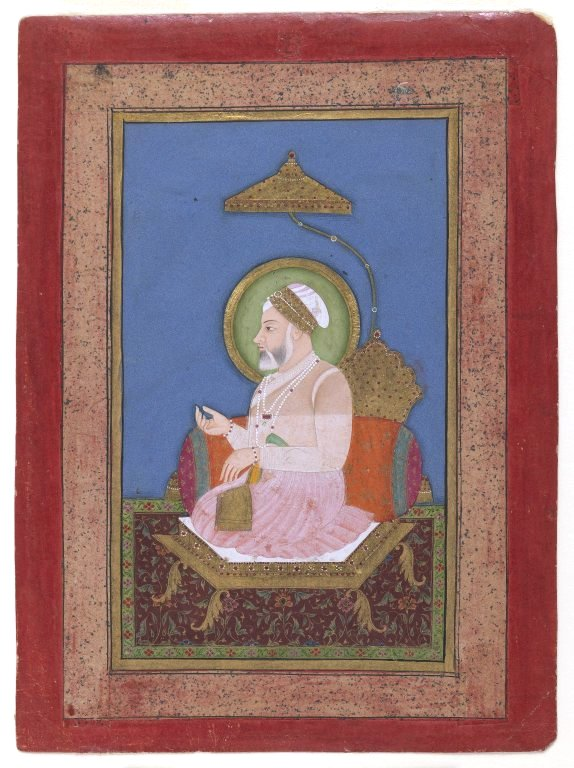
Portrait of Mughal emperor Alamgir II

Moin-ul-Mulk governed the Punjab until his death in November 1753, and was succeeded by Mughlani Begum. In March 1756, Mughal vizier Imad ul-Mulk imprisoned and replaced her with Adina Beg. Mughlani Begum pleaded Ahmad Shah to lead another invasion, promising wealth.

Due to the tyrannies of Imad ul-Mulk, several nobles such as Najib ud-Daula, a chief of Rohilkand, and the new Mughal emperor Alamgir II, pleaded for Ahmad Shah to invade. Ahmad Shah accepted the invitations and began his fourth invasion in November 1756, leaving Peshawar on the 15th, and crossing Attock on the 26th with an army of 80,000 men. He reached Lahore on 20 December, seizing the city with little resistance. Ahmad Shah garnered tribute from the city before continuing his march, crossing the Sutlej river on 10 January at Ludhiana, while the advance guard under his general, Jahan Khan, seized Sirhind, Karnal, and Panipat.

The Marathas, who had signed a treaty to protect the Mughals from foreign invasions in 1752, assembled a contingent of 3,400 men under Antaji Mankeshwar, battling the Afghans at Narela. The Maratha forces, however, were defeated and forced to withdraw with losses of 100 men. Following the defeat of the Marathas, Najib ud-Daula defected to the Afghans, with Imad ul-Mulk surrendering not long after. Jahan Khan continued his advance to Luni and besieged Shahdara on 17 January, with the Jama Masjid in Delhi reading Ahmad Shah's name in the Khutbah as a sign of sovereignty. The Afghan forces continued advancing on Delhi, arriving before the city on 28 January.

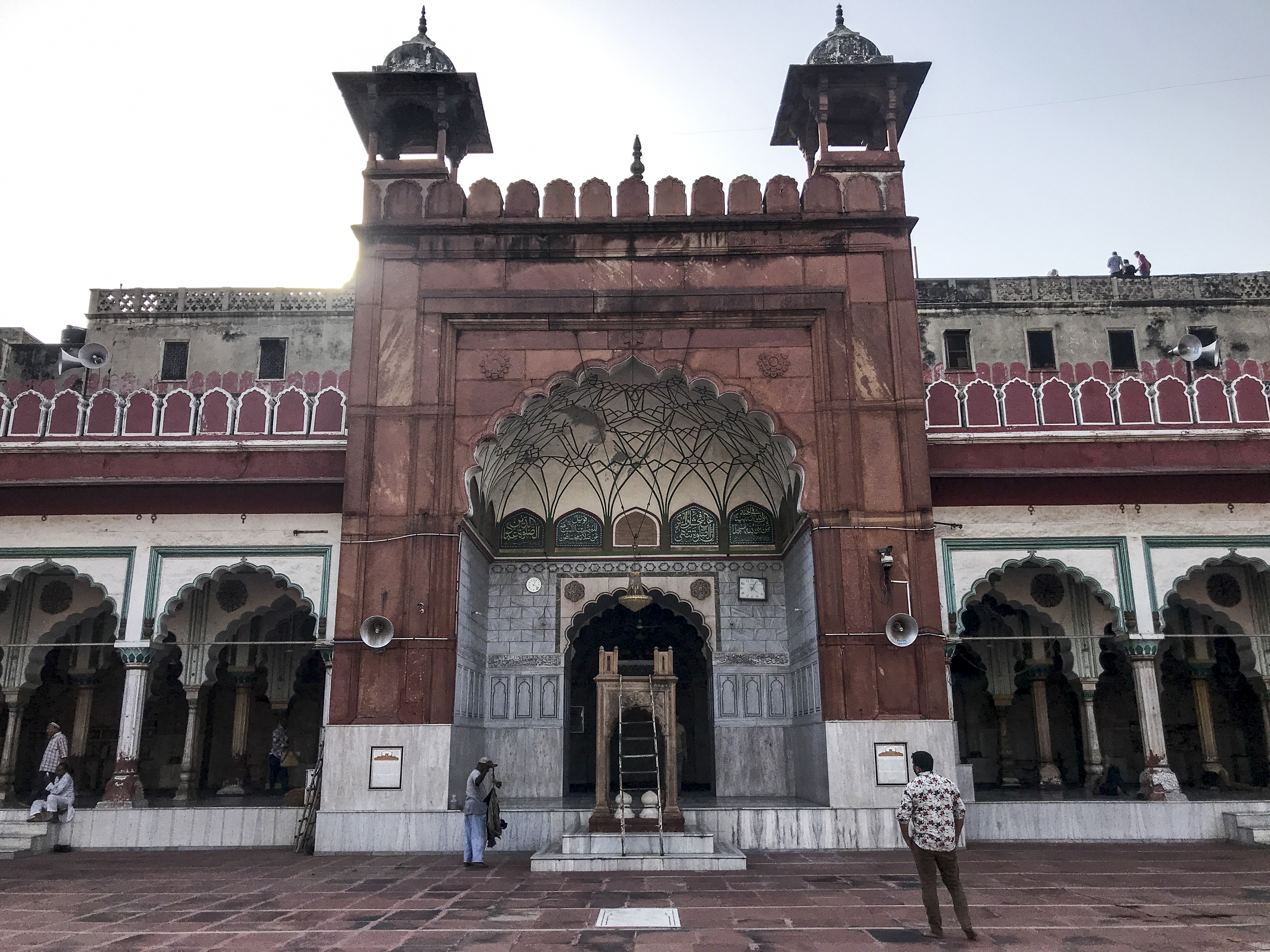
Fatehpuri Mosque, where Alamgir received Ahmad Shah before he entered Delhi

Meeting with Alamgir at the Fatehpuri Mosque, Ahmad Shah led a grand entry into Delhi, which was marked with a gun salute. However many inhabitants of the city had already fled or hidden, with the streets completely deserted. Many people barricaded themselves in their houses. Ahmad Shah's name was also inserted in the Khutbah for other mosques. Initially, the Afghan army was ordered not to sack the city.

Alamgir was placed under house arrest, and houses outside the city of Delhi were ravaged. On the 29th, the bazaars of the city were sacked and Jahan Khan's soldiers extracted tribute from Feroz Shah Kotla, a large fortress in Delhi. On 30 January, Ahmad Shah minted coins in his name. He further married Hazrat Begum, a daughter of Alamgir, whilst also marrying his son, Timur Shah Durrani, to another daughter of Alamgir.

Ahmad Shah then ordered all Hindus to wear distinctive marks on their head, as well as forbidding non-Muslims from wearing the turban. Extortionate demands were also placed upon the Mughal nobility. The Mughal nobility refused, to which Ahmad Shah dispatched his own tax collectors, demanding additional tribute. Those suspected of concealing valuables were subjected to torture, including foot whipping. Many thousands died or were crippled as a result, while others resorted to suicide. Additionally, a tax was imposed on every household in Delhi.

Imad ul-Mulk was forced to hand over gold and ornaments valued at 10 million rupees, and another 300,000 gold coins. Intizam-ud-Daulah was summoned, and many of his assets were confiscated, including over 10 million rupees and 100 of his wives. Unable to produce the required wealth, Intizam admitted that his father had buried a fortune, which the Afghans uncovered. The Afghans recovered over 15 million rupees in cash, along with various goods, including 200 golden candles that were the size of a man. The treasure also included diamonds, rubies, pearls, and emeralds.

After the sacking, Ahmad Shah campaigned against the Jats. Suraj Mal, the ruler of the Jats, initially submitted to Ahmad Shah, but refused to send asylum seekers from the sacking of Delhi, resulting in conflict. An Afghan force was sent to Faridabad, seizing the fortress and razing it. However, a Jat raid under Jawahar Singh defeated the Afghans, massacring them. Ahmad Shah, in response, laid siege to Ballabhgarh, while Jahan Khan and Najib ud-Daula were dispatched to loot the surrounding regions. They advanced toward Mathura, while Jawahar Singh met them for battle at Chaumuhan. The battle that ensued left between 10 and 12,000 dead on both sides combined, with an innumerable amount of men wounded as well. Jawahar Singh, however, alongside Antaji Mankeshwar, reinforced Ballabhgarh. The cannon fire of the Afghans completely broke the defenses of the fortress, forcing Jawahar to withdraw in the night, with Afghan forces seizing the city on 4 March. An expedition under Abdus Samad Khan, another one of Ahmad Shah's generals, nearly arrested Jawahar Singh through ambush, but Jawahar ultimately evaded capture.

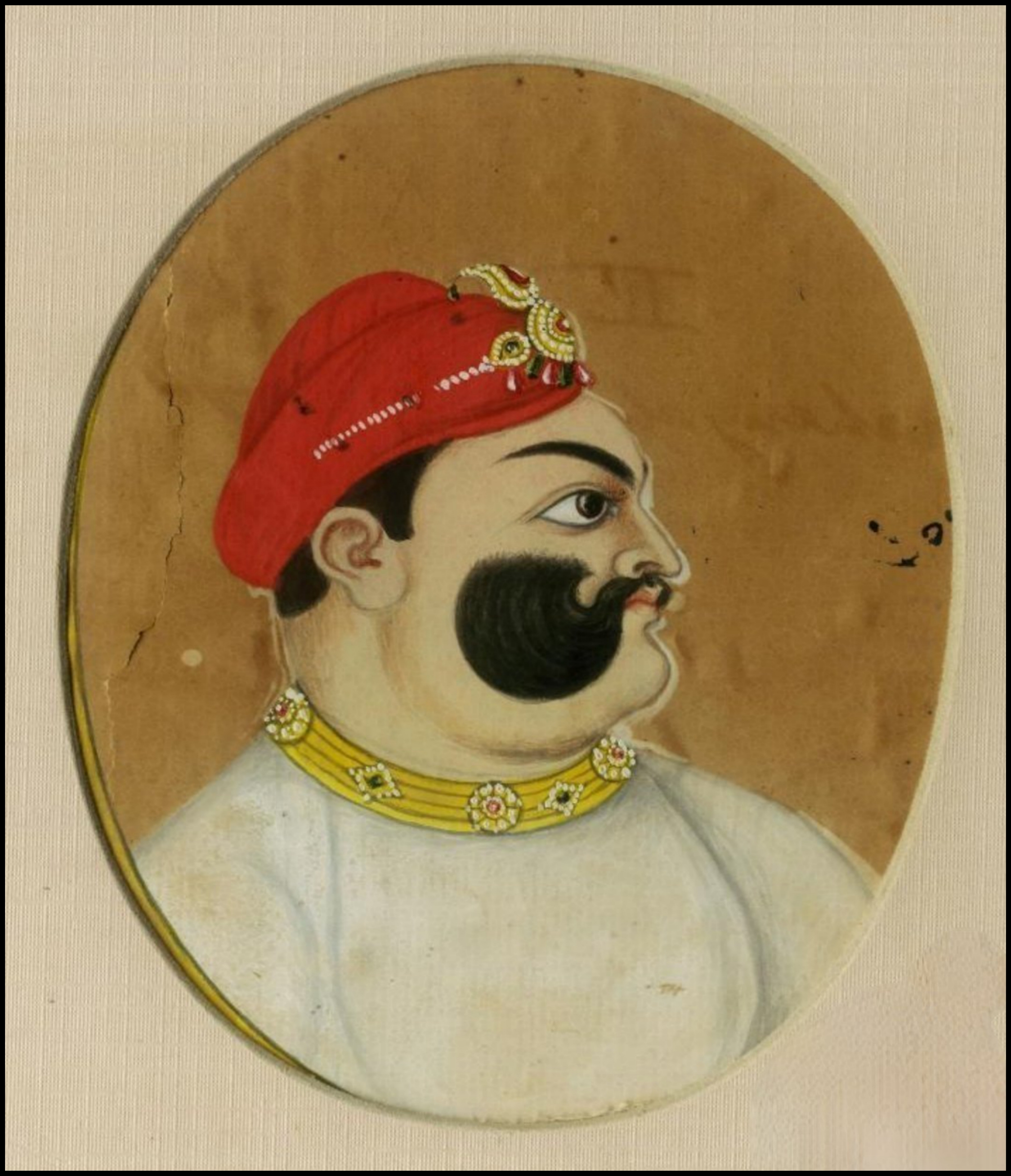
Portrait of Jawahar Singh

Toward the end of February 1757, the Afghan forces arrived at and attacked Mathura. The city, despite being inhabited overwhelmingly by non-combatants, mainly pilgrims due to the Hindu Holi festival, was attacked and the inhabitants were massacred by the Afghans. The Afghan forces slaughtered and defiled the bodies of Hindu ascetics by humiliating them with slaughtered cows. Temples of the city were razed, and the images of idols were destroyed. Jahan Khan furthered the massacre by rewarding a bounty of five rupees for every Hindu head, resulting in the death of thousands of men, women, and children. The Muslims of the city were subjected to the attack as well. Following his massacre at Mathura, Jahan Khan continued his campaign, with the city of Vrindavan being attacked and its inhabitants massacred on 6 March. The Tarikh-I-Husain Shahi establishes the idol destruction in line with iconoclasm, remarking: "Idols were broken and kicked about like polo-balls by the Islamic heroes."

Ahmad Shah, following Jahan Khan, attacked the city of Gokul on 16 March, which was inhabited by Naga Sadhus, a Hindu Bhakti sect. The Afghans attacked the city where a battle ensued, resulting in the death of 2,000 men for both sides. Jugal Kishor, a diplomat from the Bengal Subah, informed Ahmad Shah that there was nothing of value in Gokul. Ahmad Shah ordered a withdrawal, sparing the city from a sacking.

On 21 March, Jahan Khan arrived before Agra with 15,000 men, besieging the city. Civilians from the town received Jahan Khan and his army, promising 500,000 rupees in tribute. However, after failing to raise the amount, Afghan forces entered the city, plundering it and massacring over 2,000. The Afghan forces attempted to seize the citadel but failed due to the defense of Mirza Saifullah, the garrison commander. He defended the fort with extensive artillery usage, preventing the Afghans from approaching with cannons. Jahan Khan seized 100,000 rupees in tribute, before withdrawing to Ahmad Shah's camp on 24 March after being recalled.

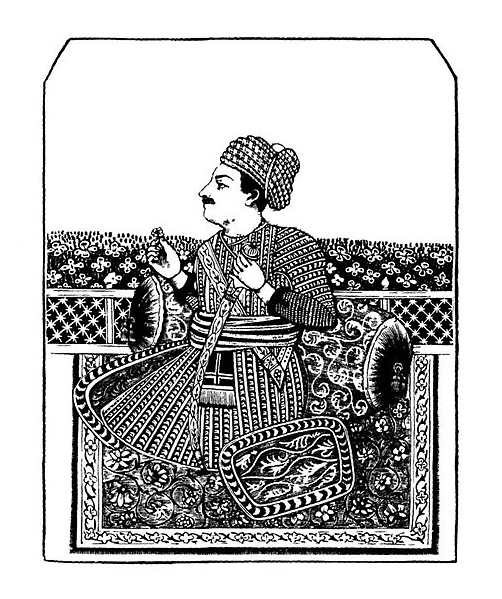
Illustration of Najib ud-Daula

Cholera had broken out in the Afghan camp, killing around 150 men per day, beginning mainly from the polluted Yamuna River which was overwhelmed with bodies. As a result, Ahmad Shah intended to return to Afghanistan, especially to secure the loot from the campaign. The heat as a result from the beginning of the Indian summer also convinced him. As a result, Ahmad Shah began returning for Afghanistan in April 1757, declaring his son, Timur Shah, governor of the Punjab, while Jahan Khan served as his deputy. Sirhind was annexed from the Mughals, while Imad ul-Mulk was re-instated as vizier, with Najib ud-Daula given the office of Mir Bakhshi. Alamgir was permitted to rule Delhi, however as a vassal of the Durrani Empire.

The Afghan invasion had dire consequences for the Mughal Empire, as most of the Mughal army, along with those from the Bengal Subah, were forcibly deployed against the Afghans. Mere months later, the army of the Bengal Subah, weakened due to the Afghan invasion, were utterly defeated at the Battle of Plassey, beginning the rise of British power in India.

The total loot Ahmad Shah carried back to Afghanistan is disputed. Its been estimated from contemporary writers that the Afghans seized 30 to 300 million rupees worth of goods. Over 28,000 elephants, camels, and mules carried Ahmad Shah's loot, alongside his 80,000 men, who carried whatever they took, with many of the Afghan cavalry returning on foot, while they loaded loot unto their horses. The massacres done by the Afghans throughout the campaign made the Yamuna River flow red with blood for two weeks.

=== Durrani administration of the Punjab (1757–1758) ===
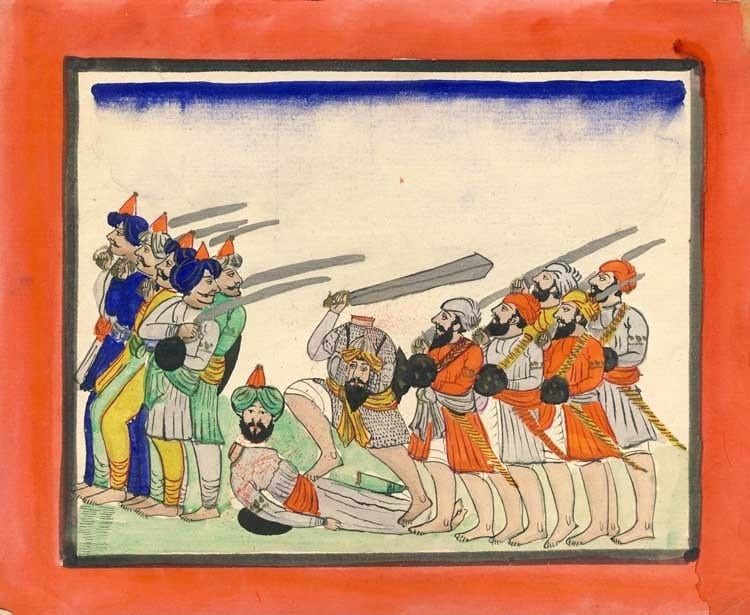
Depiction of the battle of Amritsar (1757) between the Sikhs and Afghans

Timur Shah, being only eleven years old, saw the Punjab governed mostly by Jahan Khan, who was noted as an experienced warrior, but incapable administrator. He attacked the Sikhs who were celebrating the Diwali festival at Amritsar in 1757, as well as destroying and polluting many Sikh shrines, declaring Jihad. The tyrannies of Jahan Khan resulted in the Sikhs forging an alliance with Adina Beg, who had initially fled during Ahmad Shah's fourth invasion.

As a result, Jahan Khan led a campaign against Adina Beg in the Jalandhar Doab, pillaging the region. Adina Beg acquiesced to submitting tribute, but ignored summons to the Afghan court in Lahore. On one such occasion of being summoned, Adina Beg refused to trust Jahan Khan and fled to the Hill states, where he forged an alliance with Vadbhag Singh Sodhi and Jassa Singh Ahluwalia, the leader of the Dal Khalsa.

Jahan Khan dispatched a force under Murad Khan in response, meeting the alliance at the battle of Mahilpur, where the Afghans were defeated, resulting in the looting of the Jalandhar Doab. Further dispatches from Lahore were sent to quell the alliance but all were defeated, allowing the Sikhs to plunder the suburbs of Lahore.

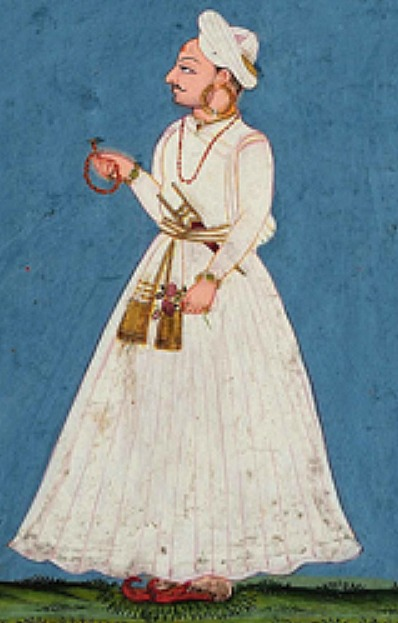
Painting of Raghunath Rao

Further complications occurred for the Afghans, as a Maratha force led by Raghunath Rao had arrived at Agra in May 1757 by the time Ahmad Shah was crossing the Indus River back to Afghanistan. The Maratha forces completely seized the Ganges Doab, and defeated Najib ud-Daula at the battle of Delhi in September 1757. Alamgir II was retained on the throne as a puppet, and Imad ul-Mulk remained as vizier. Adina Beg thus requested the Marathas to invade the Punjab, which Raghunath Rao accepted.

The Maratha invasion began in February 1758, advancing and reaching Sirhind in March, which was besieged. Abdus Samad Khan, the Afghan governor of Sirhind, fled the city but was eventually captured, with Sirhind being plundered after. The developments at Sirhind alerted Jahan Khan, who raised an army of 2,000 men and scouted far ahead of Lahore, but refused to give battle to the alliance. Upon receiving news that the Marathas were approaching Lahore, he began preparing to return to Afghanistan on 19 April.

Establishing camp at Shahdara, the Afghans retreated across the Ravi, leaving Lahore in lawlessness, and to be captured by the alliance. Afghan rearguard contingents were ambushed by the Marathas, emboldening Jahan Khan and Timur Shah to speed their progress to Afghanistan. Further close encounters at Eminabad saw the Afghans driven to the Chenab below Wazirabad, where they were attacked by the Marathas and Sikhs, who took some two hundred Afghan prisoners. After this encounter, modern scholarship designates the end of the Maratha pursuit. Near contemporary sources state that the Marathas were able to establish themselves at Attock, and possibly even Peshawar.

== Fifth invasion (1759–1761) ==
Preoccupied with the uprising in Kalat, Ahmad Shah was unable to pursue a campaign against the Marathas, instead dispatching his generals, Jahan Khan and Nur ud-Din Bamizai, who were both defeated. In October 1759, Ahmad Shah began his fifth invasion of India. He had been invited by numerous rulers and religious leaders across India, including Shah Waliullah Dehlawi, who wrote to Ahmad Shah pleading for him to save the Muslims of India. Ahmad Shah utilized this in having it declared a jihad by religious leaders in Kandahar. Further invitations were sent by Najib ud-Daula, who wanted India to become a permanent extension of the Afghan empire. Alamgir II sent fervent requests to Ahmad Shah for aid, affirming his loyalty and informing him of the intentions of Imad ul-Mulk, who wished to assassinate him. Even Hindu rulers such as Madho Singh, the ruler of Amber, and Vijay Singh, the ruler of Marwar, were discontent over Maratha expansion, and sent letters to Ahmad Shah. Ahmad Shah also wished to avenge the defeat of his son, Timur Shah, and to reclaim the lost territories of the Punjab.

Beginning his invasion, Ahmad Shah split his forces to attack from two sides. Jahan Khan advanced from Kandahar to Kabul, and then through the Khyber Pass with an army of 20,000, while Ahmad Shah led a force of 40,000 through the Bolan Pass. He was further reinforced by Nasir Khan, and other Afghan chiefs, eventually fording the Indus on 25 October 1759. As Ahmad Shah entered the Punjab, Jahan Khan had forced the Maratha forces stationed at Attock to evacuate, pursuing them and battling at Rohtas, where the Maratha army was routed, forcing a withdrawal to as far as Delhi.

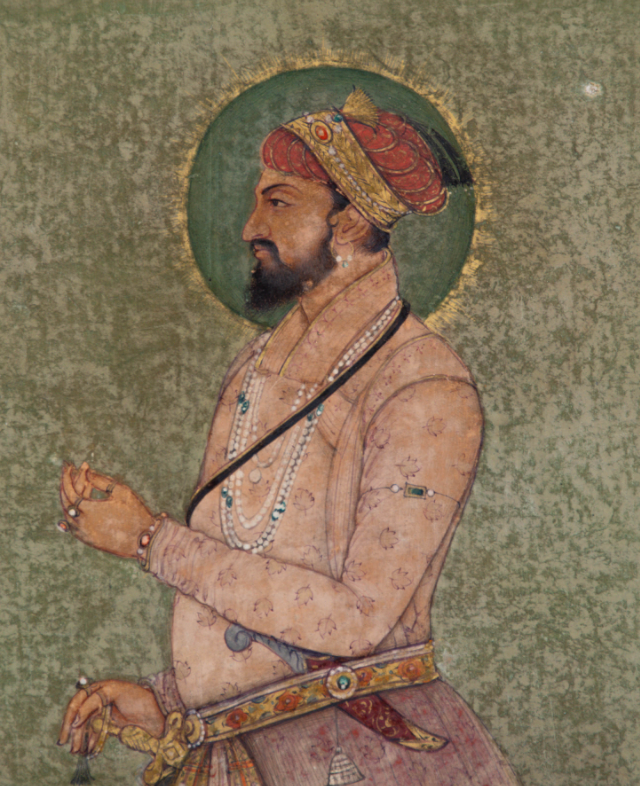
Portrait of Shah Jahan III, who was placed on the Mughal throne after Imad ul-Mulk had Alamgir assassinated

As this happened, Ahmad Shah approached Multan with his army. The Maratha governor in response, fled to Lahore, leaving the city to be captured without resistance. With the Afghans converging on Lahore, the Maratha forces withdrew to Batala, and then Sirhind, with some Maratha detachments being caught and destroyed. At Lahore, Jahan Khan battled with the Sikhs. No clear victor emerged, and the Afghans suffered some 2,000 dead, while Jahan Khan was wounded during the battle.

The approach of Ahmad Shah Durrani caused havoc throughout all of Northern India, causing Imad ul-Mulk to have Alamgir and Intizam-ud-Daulah murdered as a result, placing Shah Jahan III on the Mughal throne. Ahmad Shah continued advancing through the Punjab, with Jahan Khan seizing Sirhind on 27 November, with both armies uniting at Sirhind in December 1759.

Enraged by the execution of Alamgir, Ahmad Shah began racing toward Delhi. He reached Ambala on 20 December, and advanced toward Taraori, beginning a battle against the Marathas led by Dattaji Scindia. The advance guard of the Afghan army came in clash against the Marathas, and was initially routed, beginning a withdrawal. However, Ahmad Shah, ready to support the battle, dispatched 5,000 men under Shah Pasand Khan. The forces of Imad ul-Mulk in the battle completely fled at the sight of Shah Pasand's flag, and the Afghans attacked with muskets. Further detachments of the Afghan army sent by Ahmad Shah brought the battle to an end, with the Maratha force completely surrounded and destroyed.

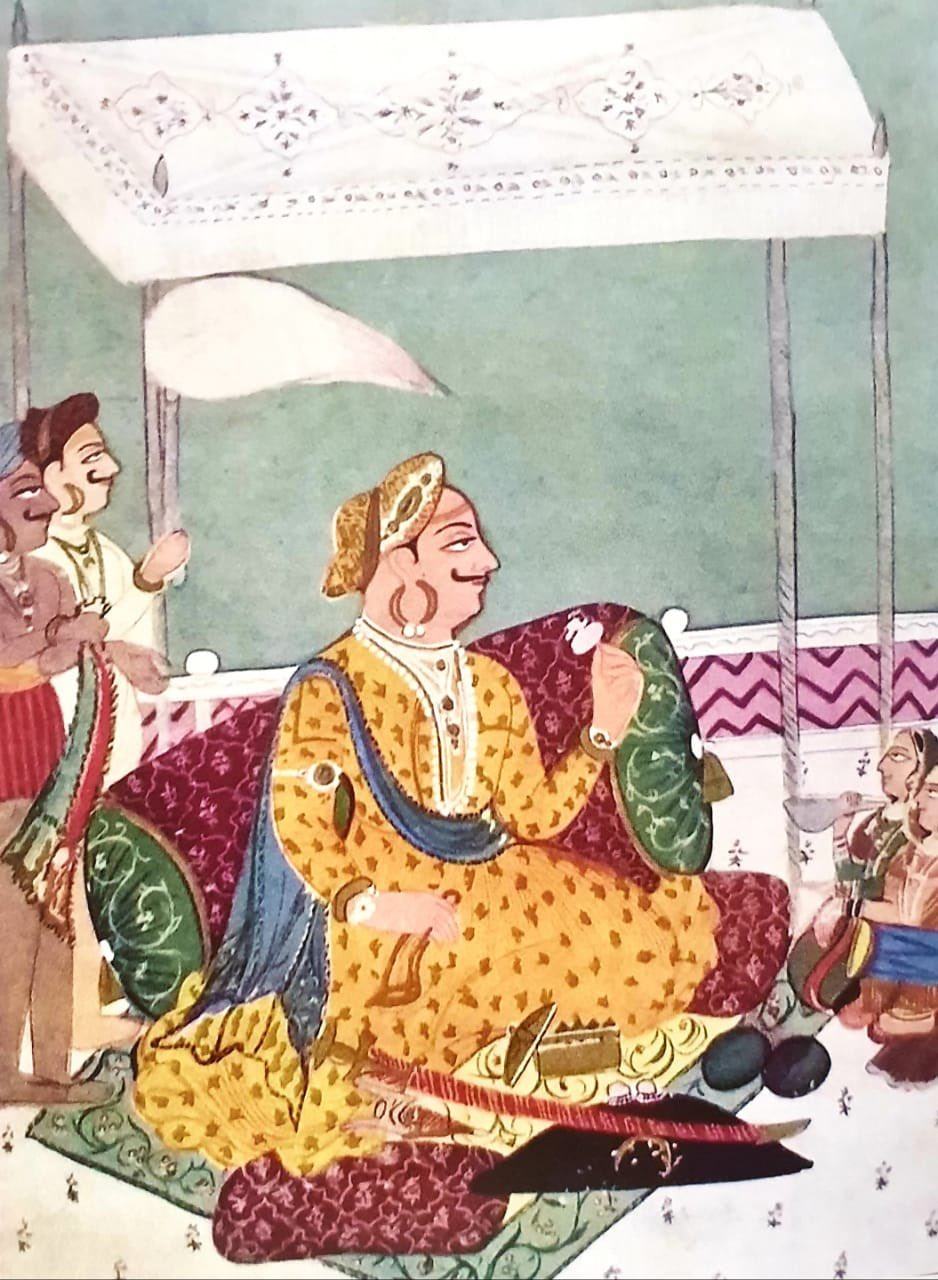
Portrait of Dattaji Scindia

Following the battle, Ahmad Shah forded the Yamuna and united with the forces of Najib ud-Daula and other Rohilla leaders at Saharanpur. The combined armies marched toward Delhi, encamping at Luni, some 10 kilometers from the Red Fort of Delhi on the other side of the Yamuna. Dattaji Scindia returned to Kunjpura following his defeat at Taraori, and began preparing to defend Delhi from the Afghan army. He first sent Imad ul-Mulk to prepare the defenses of the city. However, Imad ul-Mulk completely deserted the Marathas and fled to Suraj Mal.

Dattaji then advanced to Sonipat, attempting to track Ahmad Shah's movements, which was made difficult as the Afghans kept their movement confidential by killing every Indian that was found outside their houses. As a result, Dattaji established camp at Barari on 4 January 1760. On 9 January, Najib ud-Daula began crossing the Yamuna with Ahmad Shah following him, beginning the battle of Barari Ghat. The Maratha forces opposed the advance of the Afghans across the river but were overpowered by musketeers, with much of the Maratha army only armed with spears and swords. Dattaji, attempting to enter the fray himself, was shot either in the eye, or the ribs, causing his death. Further Maratha reinforcements were useless against the Afghan musket fire, forcing the Marathas to withdraw from the field with a thousand dead, and the Afghans victorious.

Having defeated the Marathas at Barari Ghat, Ahmad Shah entered Delhi, with his men plundering the city. Much of the population of the city had already fled, and he took Shah Jahan III under his protection instead of claiming the Mughal throne for himself. Ahmad Shah also placed Yaqub Ali Khan as governor of the city, a nephew of his vizier, Shah Wali Khan, before beginning to march against Suraj Mal.

Leaving Delhi on 27 January, Ahmad Shah besieged Deeg on 7 February, although not committing to the siege seriously. While besieging, he sent a detachment under Jahan Khan which routed a Maratha army on 11 February at Rewari. Following this, Ahmad Shah pursued a Maratha force led by Malhar Rao Holkar, who was stationed at Narnaul. After reaching Rewari, Ahmad Shah was evaded by Holkar, and the Maratha force crossed the Yamuna river on 26—27 February, entering Najib ud-Daula's territories. On 28 February, Holkar advanced to Sikandrabad, awaiting for news of the Afghan position. On 1 March 1760, Ahmad Shah dispatched a force of 15,000 under Jahan Khan, Shah Pasand Khan, and Qalandar Khan to halt the Maratha army. The Marathas were caught on 4 March and were completely routed at the battle of Sikandarabad, with many Maratha officers slain. Holkar himself fled for his life to Agra, and then to Bharatpur, meeting Suraj Mal.

With another victory over the Marathas, Ahmad Shah proceeded to Aligarh, which belonged to the Jats, and besieged it. Unable to receive any reinforcement, the fort surrendered to the Afghans. At Aligarh, Najib ud-Daula advised Ahmad Shah to rest and wait out for the summer and monsoon seasons to pass, especially as the summer had been so catastrophic for the Afghans during the fourth invasion of India. Najib ud-Daula used this to expel the Marathas from Shikohabad, Phaphund, and Bithoor.

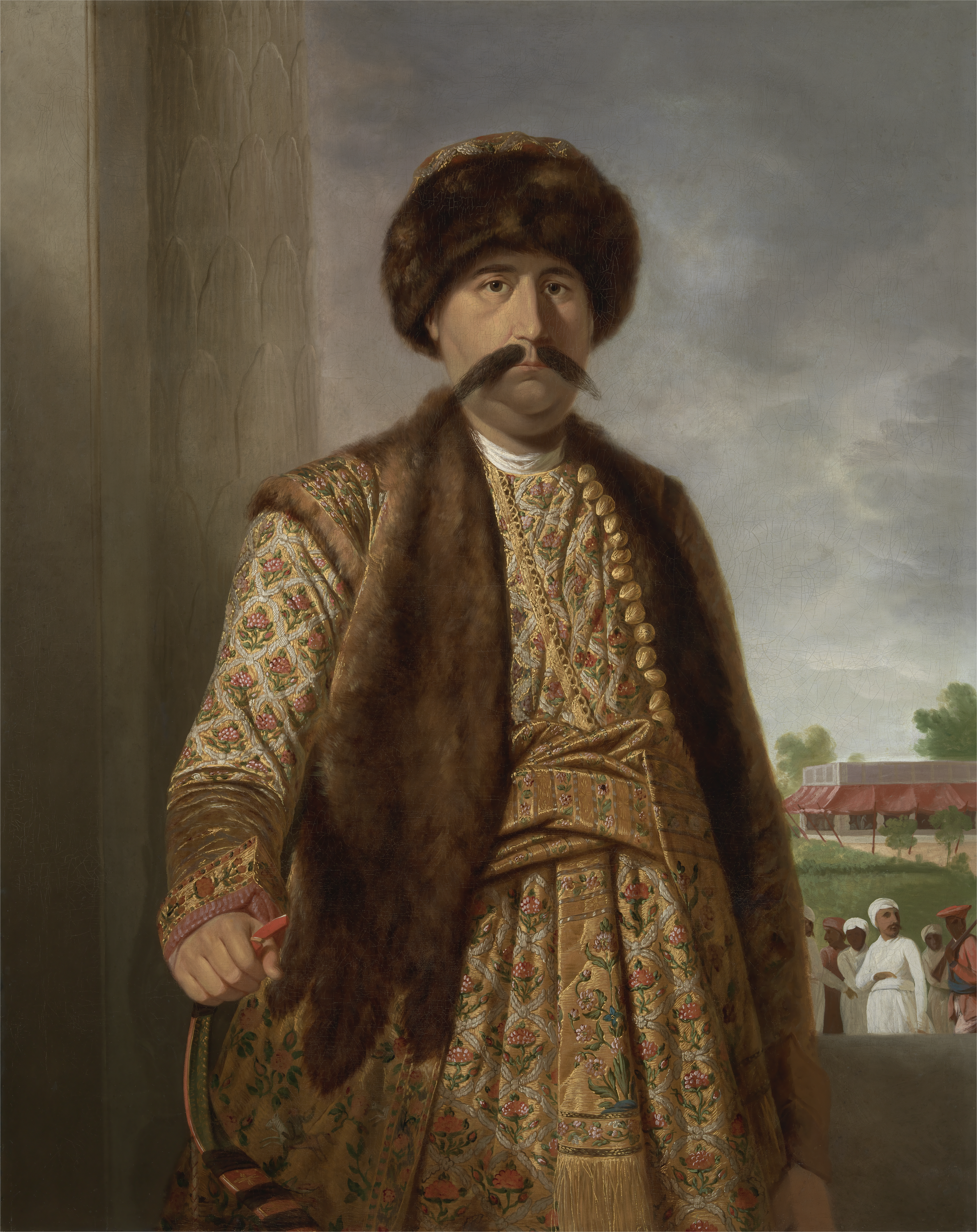
Painting of Shuja ud-Daula, a vital Durrani ally during Ahmad Shah's fifth invasion

As the Afghans settled in, they resorted to diplomacy to strengthen their position. Ahmad Khan Bangash, although an initial Maratha ally, was appealed to by Shah Wali Khan, Ahmad Shah's vizier, as an Afghan brother. Ahmad Khan thus allied with the Durranis and arrived at their camp on 13 April 1760. The Afghans also successfully negotiated with the ruler of Oudh, Shuja ud-Daula, who united with the Durrani camp in July 1760. Ahmad Shah also held friendly relations with the Rajputs, even declaring to them his intention to invade the Deccan in the winter.

As this occurred, the Marathas sent reinforcements under Sadashivrao Bhau, a cousin of the Peshwa, Balaji Baji Rao. The reinforcements also included Vishwasrao, the heir of the Maratha Confederacy, and nearly all significant Maratha commanders. Sadashivrao was described as an ignorant commander with a short temper and pride, ignoring the advice of more senior commanders who had experience in Northern India, and failing to anticipate certain outcomes.

The Maratha force reached Agra on 14 July. Sadashivrao, finding the Yamuna river overflowing, settled on advancing to Delhi. The Marathas advanced from Mathura and reached Delhi on 23 July, where it was stormed. The city fell to the Marathas, but the citadel held out. On 29 July, negotiations for the garrisons withdrawal went underway, and Yaqub Ali was allowed to leave the city with his men unharmed to Ahmad Shah's camp, with Maratha forces occupying the fort on 1 August.

The Marathas began facing difficulties when on 4 August, Suraj Mal and Imad ul-Mulk defected from the Marathas and returned to their posts. Furthermore, the Maratha army lacked food and feed for their horses. The situation became so difficult that Sadashivrao recorded in a letter that there was no food to pay for money, and that the men of the army alongside the horses were fasting. Peace negotiations corresponding from Ahmad Shah and the Marathas had also failed, with both seeking their own extensive demands.

By the end of September 1760, the Maratha camp was overridden with starvation. Ahmad Shah, however, was anxious to return to Afghanistan since his settling at Aligarh, as he never intended to form an Afghan empire based in India. The Marathas left Delhi on 10 October, which Ahmad Shah responded by having his army arrayed across the Yamuna. Sadashivrao, intending to seize Kunjpura, which had vast supplies, arrived before the city on 16 October. The battle of Kunjpura ensued which saw the Marathas victorious and the Afghan governor at Kunjpura, Najabat Khan, alongside Abdus Samad Khan killed. Ahmad Shah was unable to help the defenders of Delhi and Kunjpura due to him being stuck on the other side of the Yamuna.

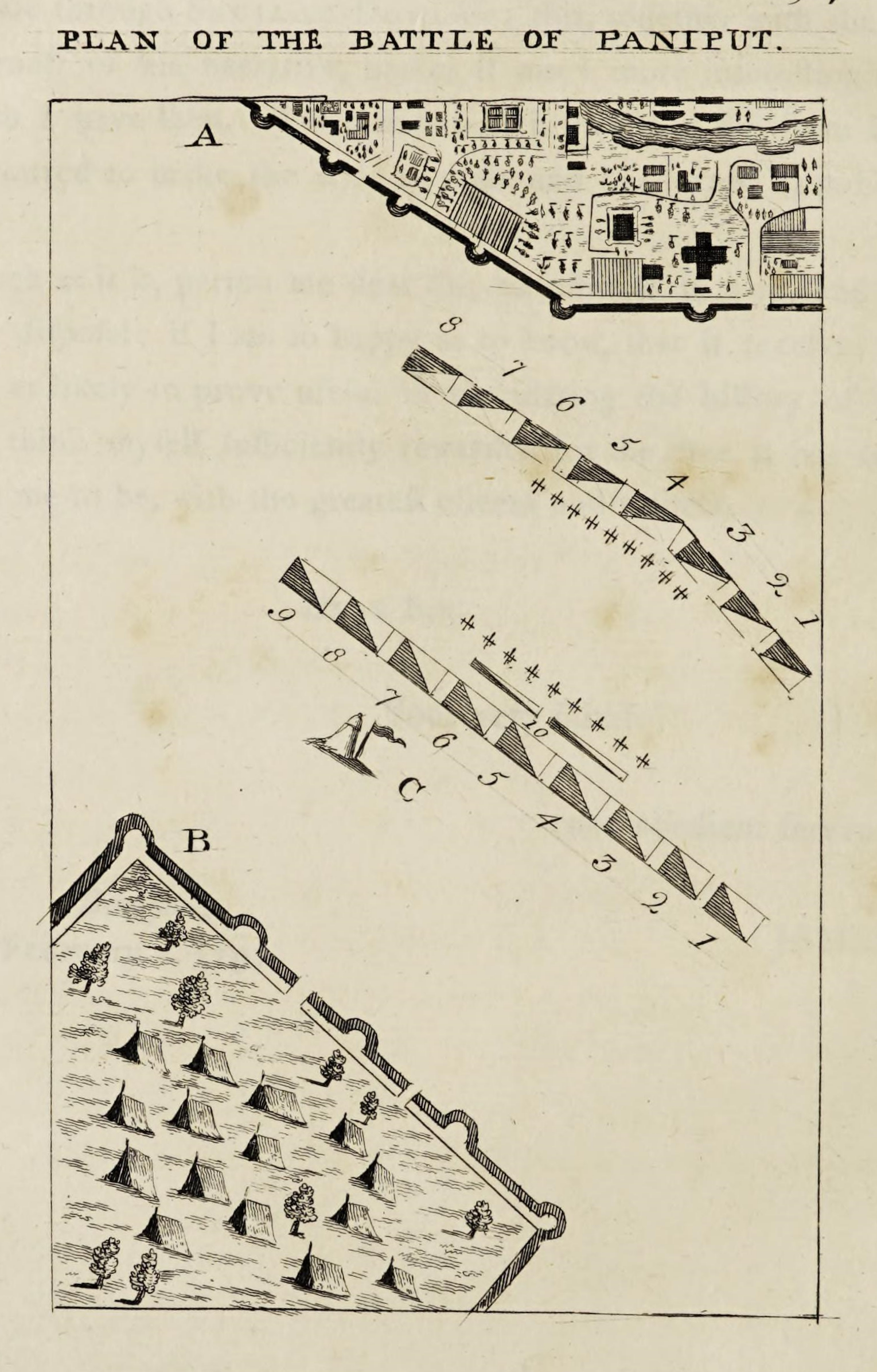
Afghan and Maratha camps detailed by a plan of the third battle of Panipat

Ahmad Shah, infuriated at the fall of Kunjpura, began preparing a crossing over the flooded and practically unfordable Yamuna river at Baghpat. The Afghan forces crossed between 25 and 26 October, massacring a Maratha detachment at near Sonipat. Another battle at Sambhalka saw the Marathas forced back to their camp now established at Panipat. On 30 October, Ahmad Shah reached Sambhalka, and arrayed before the Marathas on 1 November.

Najib ud-Daula was dispatched by Ahmad Shah to prevent Maratha supplies flowing in from Delhi, defeating the forces of Naro Shankar, the Maratha governor of Delhi. Saashivrao in response sent Govind Pant Bundela to invade the Rohilla territories and cut off Afghan supply. Marching with 12,000 horsemen, the Maratha detachment advanced as far as Meerut before being set upon by an Afghan contingent of 14,000 dispatched by Ahmad Shah on 17 December under Atai Khan, who slew Govind and routed the Maratha force, with large amounts of supplies being seized by the Afghans.

The Marathas were cut off from all supplies as a result, and a last desperate attempt for peace was sent by Sadashivrao, even agreeing on any term Ahmad Shah deemed fit. Najib ud-Daula shut down the idea and Ahmad Shah rejected peace. As starvation gripped the Maratha camp, Sadashivrao concluded with his cabinet of war on 13 January to attack the Afghans. On 14 January, the Maratha forces assembled and began marching on the Afghan camp. The numbers of the battle vary by source. Mehta presents the Afghans at having 79,800 men, and the Marathas 85,000, with numerous non-combatants. The Afghans had a gradual flow of manpower stream into the army while the Marathas did not, making it definite that the Marathas were far outnumbered at the battle.

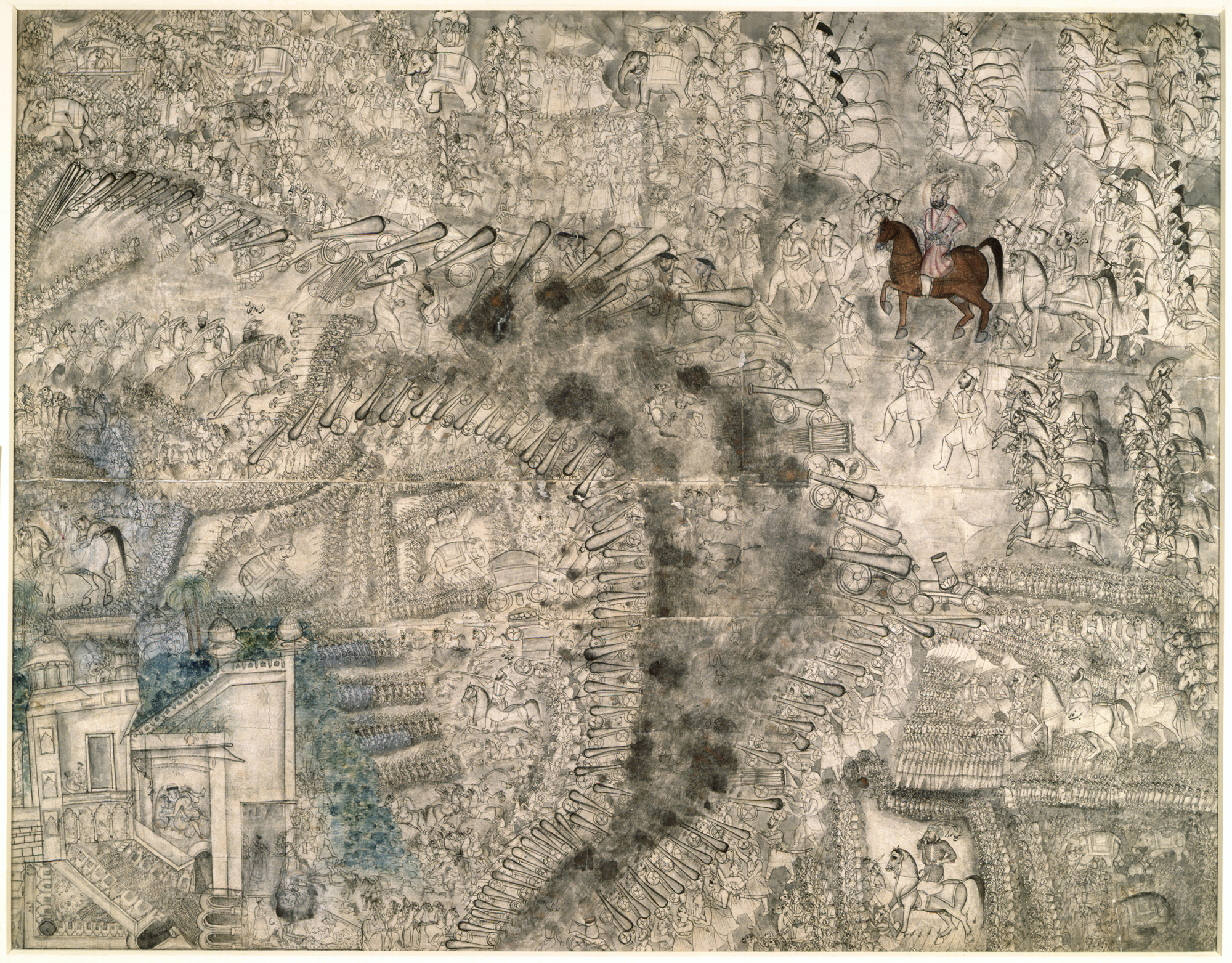
Painting of the Third Battle of Panipat in Northern India

Beginning the third battle of Panipat, Ibrahim Khan Gardi unleashed his cannons on the Afghans. However, the troops operating the cannons were completely inexperienced and upon firing, the artillery shots merely flew overhead the Afghan army. Ibrahim Khan, realizing his failure in this regard, held his cannon fire and instead engaged with a detachment of his troops against the Rohilla portions of Ahmad Shah's army. Other Maratha officers attempted to engage as well by Ibrahim Khan's forces, which was met with musket fire from the Rohillas that saw the Marathas beaten back with heavy casualties, while Ibrahim Khan's forces were devastated by Rohilla cavalry, resulting in the losses of over six battalions and Ibrahim Khan himself being wounded, with the Maratha left wing failing.

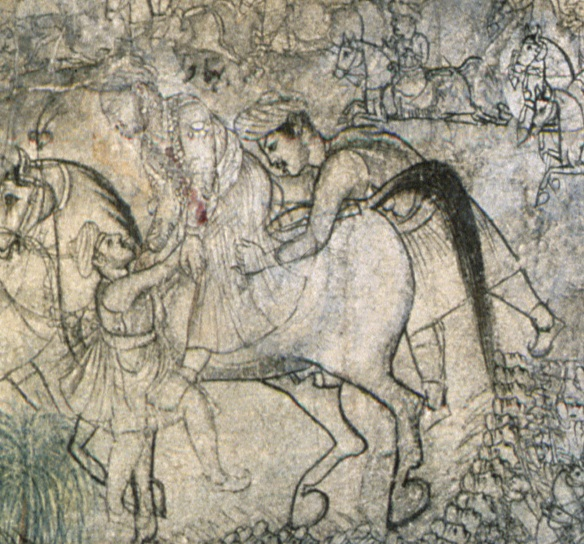
Painting of a wounded Sadashivrao being carried away on horseback during the Third battle of Panipat

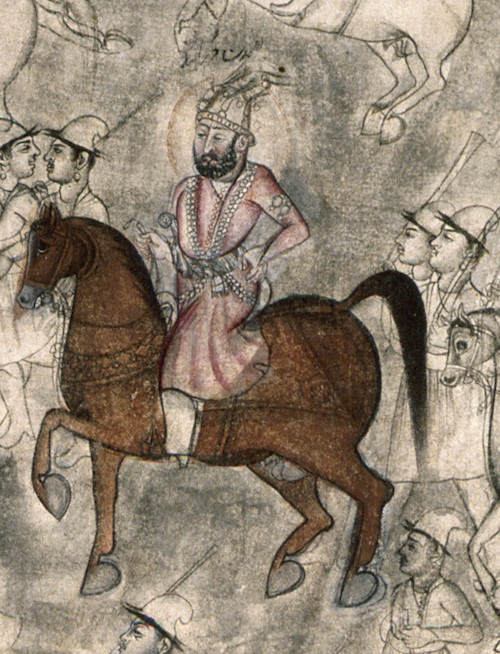
Ahmad Shah Durrani depicted on horseback during the Third battle of Panipat

Sadashivrao led an attack on the Afghan centre as well during this, with both sides numerically similar. Despite the Rohilla victory on the left wing, the Afghan centre was exposed, with the Marathas dismantling over three lines in the Afghan centre, and inflicting some 3,000 dead or wounded. At the pivotal moment, Ahmad Shah surged his reinforcements, some 4,000 Qizilbash to the right wing and 10,000 men to the Afghan centre. Ahmad Shah also dispatched his zamburaks, inflicting heavy casualties onto the Marathas. A counter-attack was thus launched by the Afghans across all fronts.

Amidst the fray, Vishwasrao was killed by a bullet. News of his death spread quickly throughout the Maratha camp, and it led to the desertion of over 2,000 Afghans and Rohillas that were in service of the Marathas. The Maratha left wing was thus dismantled, and routed. As the Rohillas launched their own attack, Holkar fled the battle. The Afghan left wing thus caved in on the centre, while the Maratha right wing was completely annihilated by Najib ud-Daula. Following this, Ahmad Shah advanced to the centre to command the final operation of battle.

Sadashivrao attempted to assault the Afghan centre twice but was pushed back with heavy losses. Ahmad Shah then ordered eight thousand reinforcements from his own tribe to attack, which saw Sadashivrao killed amidst the fray. The death of Sadashivrao saw all Maratha resistance dissipate and the Maratha centre was slaughtered. The Marathas who tried to escape the battle were pursued.

The casualties of the battle saw as low as 75,000 Marathas estimated to have been killed, to as high as 100,000. This included over 30,000 Marathas perishing in battle, another 10,000 being killed while retreating, and another 10,000 reported missing. While following the battle, 50,000 Maratha camp followers were massacred or sold to slavery.

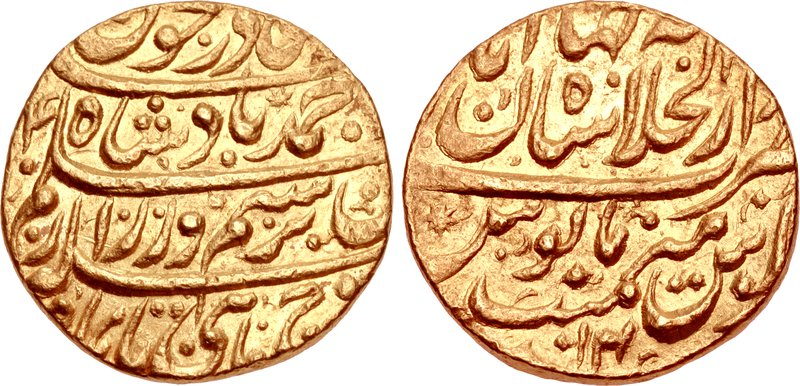
Coin of Ahmad Shah Durrani, struck in Delhi

Panipat resulted in the end of Maratha influence over Northern India. The day following the battle, Ahmad Shah entered the city of Panipat wearing jewels such as the Koh-i-Noor. The Afghan troops massacred any male over the age of fourteen and enslaved the woman and children of the city. Ahmad Shah afterward made a pilgrimage to the tomb of Bu Ali Shah Qalandar, and then left Panipat on 19 July to enter Delhi. Proceeding formally into the Red fort on 29 January, with the khutbah being read in his name and coins being struck. After resting for two months, Ahmad Shah's troops demanded to return to Afghanistan, as much of them had been unpaid for over a year and a half. As a result, after plundering Delhi, he began returning to Afghanistan on 20—22 March.

Ahmad Shah settled the affairs of India by placing Shah Alam II on the Mughal throne with Najib ud-Daula as his Bakhshi, with Jawan Bakht being recognized as heir to Shah Alam. Delhi was given to Najib ud-Daula and Jawan Bakht to rule together, while Imad ul-Mulk was permitted to serve as vizier again. No peace deal was made with the Marathas as the Maratha Peshwa Balaji Baji Rao died soon after Panipat.

While returning to Afghanistan, the Afghan army was attacked by the Sikhs under Jassa Singh Ahluwalia, who carried away stragglers. The Sikhs attacked the Afghan flanks typically at night but maintained distance to avoid the Afghan artillery and cavalry, and avoiding pitched battle. A surprise attack on the Beas River by the Sikhs freed many Maratha prisoners. In response, Ahmad Shah established defenses around his camp every night, and at Lahore, he sent numerous expeditions against the Sikhs that captured and killed many. He completed his return to Afghanistan by May 1761.

== Sixth invasion (1762) ==
Sikh forces under Jassa Singh Ahluwalia triumphantly enter Lahore in November 1761

As Ahmad Shah retired to Afghanistan from his fifth invasion of India, the Sikhs defeated numerous of his governors, including a decisive battle at Gujranwala that resulted in the fall of Lahore in November 1761. Enraged at the defeat of his deputies, Ahmad Shah prepared for his sixth invasion of India, beginning it in February 1762.

With a light cavalry force, he dashed through the Punjab in a rapid march, with the news of which reaching the Sikhs who were engaged in a siege at Jandiala. The Sikhs raised the siege and withdrew, until their position was compromised by the Afghan governor of Malerkotla. Ahmad Shah led his forces including Zain Khan Sirhindi, catching the Sikhs at the village of Kup. The Sikhs, under Jassa Singh and Charat Singh, were completely defeated and massacred in an event known as the Vadda Ghalughara. Ahmad Shah had ordered that nobody wearing Indian clothes was to be left alive, with mostly camp followers including women and children being killed.

Following the battle of Kup, Ahmad Shah invaded through the domains of Patiala State, ruled by Ala Singh. Ahmad Shah stormed the fortress of Barnala, before Ala Singh produced himself before the Shah, submitting tribute. With this, Ahmad Shah returned to Lahore on 3 March after camping at Sirhind.

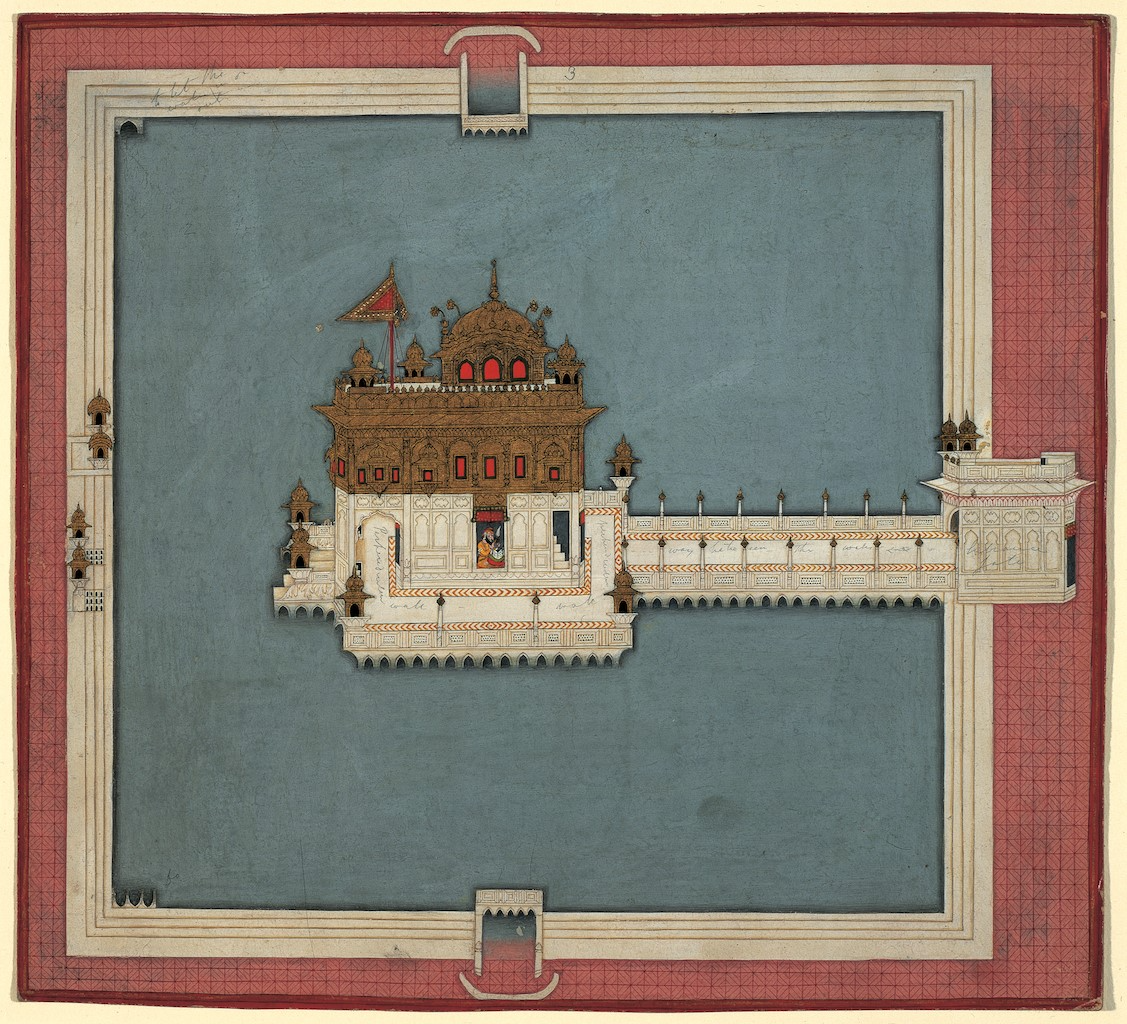
Depiction of the Golden Temple. Afghan forces had razed it and polluted the lake

At Lahore, he assembled his forces and attacked Amritsar, arriving at the city on 10 April, a day before the Vaisakhi festival. The city was sacked and a massacre ensued where the Golden Temple was razed, being blown with gunpowder and the blood of men and cows polluting the lake surrounding it. While the temple was blown with gunpowder, a piece of shrapnel hit Ahmad Shah on the nose, causing an open wound that would plague him for the rest of his life.

Following this, Ahmad Shah rested at Lahore, intending to settle the affairs of India. He firstly sent an expedition toward Kashmir which had declared its independence under Sukh Jiwan Mal, which was successful and Kashmir was re-conquered. Other political settlements also occurred, with peace negotiations ensuing with the Marathas, while also calling upon Indian princes to recognize Shah Alam II as the Mughal emperor.

Between April–May 1762, Zain Khan was defeated by the Sikhs at Harnaulgarh. During the summer months, Ahmad Shah moved his camp to Kalanaur. The Sikhs capitalized off of this, with Jassa Singh alongside Tara Singh invading the Jalandhar Doab, while Charat Singh plundered the regions north of Lahore.

In October 1762, Ahmad Shah possibly fought a battle at Amritsar, which is not accepted by all historians. The possible battle was fought under a complete solar eclipse that raged until the night, where Ahmad Shah withdrew to Lahore before returning to see the Sikhs had also withdrawn.

Afterward, Ahmad Shah placed a Hindu, Kabuli Mal, as the Durrani governor of the Punjab, believing it would bring stability. Ahmad Shah began withdrawing back to Afghanistan on 12 December after news of an uprising in Kandahar arrived, where while proceeding, he routed a Sikh army on the banks of the Ravi River. His health was significantly affected during the invasion as a result of the summer heat, adding to his wounded nose.

== Ahmad Shah Durrani’s Conquest of Kashmir ==
In May 1752, Kashmir was annexed to the empire of the Afghan ruler by Abdullah Khan Alakozai. However, Abdullah Khan only stayed in Kashmir for about six months before leaving for Afghanistan. In his absence, he appointed a relative, Khwaja Kichak, as his deputy (naib) and assigned Sukh Jiwan Mal the role of manager. Over time, Sukh Jiwan took control of the administration by first imprisoning Khwaja Kichak and later expelling him from Kashmir. After securing complete authority, Sukh Jiwan reached out to Imad-ul-Mulk Ghazi-ud-Din, a powerful noble at the Mughal court, to negotiate a formal appointment as the Raja of Kashmir under the Mughal Emperor Alamgir II. With the emperor’s approval, Sukh Jiwan officially became the Raja.

As a ruler, Sukh Jiwan proved to be just and compassionate. He did not discriminate based on religion and was known for his charitable nature, especially toward the poor. He also appointed a Kashmiri Muslim Abu'l Hasan Bandey as his Prime Minister. He took special care to repair and maintain the mausoleums of Muslim saints and the beautiful gardens of Kashmir. In addition to his official responsibilities, he personally ensured that two hundred Muslims were provided with meals daily. On the 12th and 15th of each month, he arranged for cooked food to be distributed to the people. He was particularly generous toward wandering saints (darveshes) and beggars, providing them with assistance. His love for learning was evident in his patronage of scholars and poets. Every week, he hosted public gatherings where poets from across Kashmir would come and recite their works. He also took the initiative to commission a new historical record of Kashmir and appointed a team of the region’s most distinguished poets and scholars to work on the project. Muhammad Taufiq was chosen as the head of this historical board, with other notable members including Muhammad Ali Khan Matin, Mirza Qalandar, and Muhammad Amin Khan.

Despite his effective and benevolent rule, Sukh Jiwan’s actions angered the Afghan ruler. Since he had removed the Afghan-appointed governor and instead declared allegiance to the Mughal Emperor, he directly challenged Afghan authority. He even ordered that coins be minted and the khutba (Friday sermon) be read in the name of the Mughal Emperor rather than the Afghan ruler. In response, the Afghan Shah decided to remove him and appointed Nur-ud-Din Bamezei as the new governor of Kashmir. To ensure success, Bamezei sought the support of Raja Ranjit Dev of Jammu. Shah Wali Khan, the Afghan minister, first sent his son Haji Nawab Khan to persuade the Raja, but Ranjit Dev was hesitant. The minister then sent his second son, Sher Muhammad Khan, who assured Ranjit Dev of the Afghan ruler’s goodwill. This convinced Ranjit Deo, and he traveled to Lahore, where the Afghan Shah welcomed him, honored him with a fine robe, and asked him to assist in the Kashmir campaign. Ranjit Dev agreed and assigned his son, Braj Dev, to lead the Afghan forces into the Kashmir Valley.

Meanwhile, Sukh Jiwan prepared for battle. He fortified the mountain passes to defend against the invading Afghan and Dogra forces. However, despite his efforts, the combined army of three to four thousand Afghan soldiers and troops from Jammu successfully entered Kashmir through the Tosa Maidan pass. The two sides clashed in battle at Chira Odar in the parganah (district) of Desu, but Sukh Jiwan’s forces failed to put up strong resistance. One of his key commanders, a close relative Bakht Mal, abandoned the battlefield and fled, leaving Sukh Jiwan in a desperate situation. Seeing no other option, he also tried to escape but was captured by a miller, who handed him over to Nur-ud-Din. As punishment, Nur-ud-Din blinded him and sent him to the Afghan Shah, who ultimately ordered his execution. In recognition of Raja Ranjit Dev’s assistance, the Afghan Shah granted him an annual reward of sixty thousand donkey-loads of rice from Kashmir. Nur-ud-Din Bamezei was then confirmed as the new governor of the valley.

== Seventh invasion (1764–1765) ==
After returning to Afghanistan following his sixth invasion, the Sikhs reoccupied Lahore, chasing off the Shah's governor, and sacking Kasur. The Sikhs followed up the victory by overrunning the Jalandhar Doab, while inflicting a crushing defeat to Jahan Khan at Sialkot in November 1763. The Sikhs continued their attacks, sacking the cities of Malerkotla and Morinda, and defeating another Afghan army at Sirhind, killing Zain Khan Sirhindi. The victories subsequently allowed the Sikhs to seize Rohtas, and to even plunder Multan, advancing as far as into the Derajat by the end of their campaigns.

Learning of the catastrophe, Ahmad Shah called a jihad, inviting his vassal Nasir Khan to march with him on the Punjab. Beginning the campaign in October 1764, Ahmad Shah reached Eminabad in December with 18,000 men, further being reinforced by Nasir Khan, who brought with him 12,000 men. The combined armies marched to Lahore, and a Sikh ambush on a scouting party near the city resulted in both sides withdrawing.

Ahmad Shah then proceeded with his army to Amritsar and sacked the city a third time before returning to Lahore. Frustated that he could not catch the Sikhs in pitched battle, Ahmad Shah led his forces through the Jalandhar Doab and razed the Sikh homes and farms there, accumulating supplies for his army. The Afghans advanced through Jandiala, Batala, and Dina Nagar, fighting numerous engagements with the Sikhs that typically ended unfavorably or required heavy effort to repel. The entire countryside was destroyed by the Afghan advances.

After another battle in the Jalandhar Doab that saw the Sikhs driven off, the Afghans crossed the Sutlej and repelled a Sikh army at Rupar Ghat from raiding their baggage train. After arriving at Kunjpura at the end of February 1765, Ahmad Shah was pleaded to by his generals to return to Afghanistan, fearing the heat of the summer and the rain of monsoon seasons, instead suggesting to return the following winter.

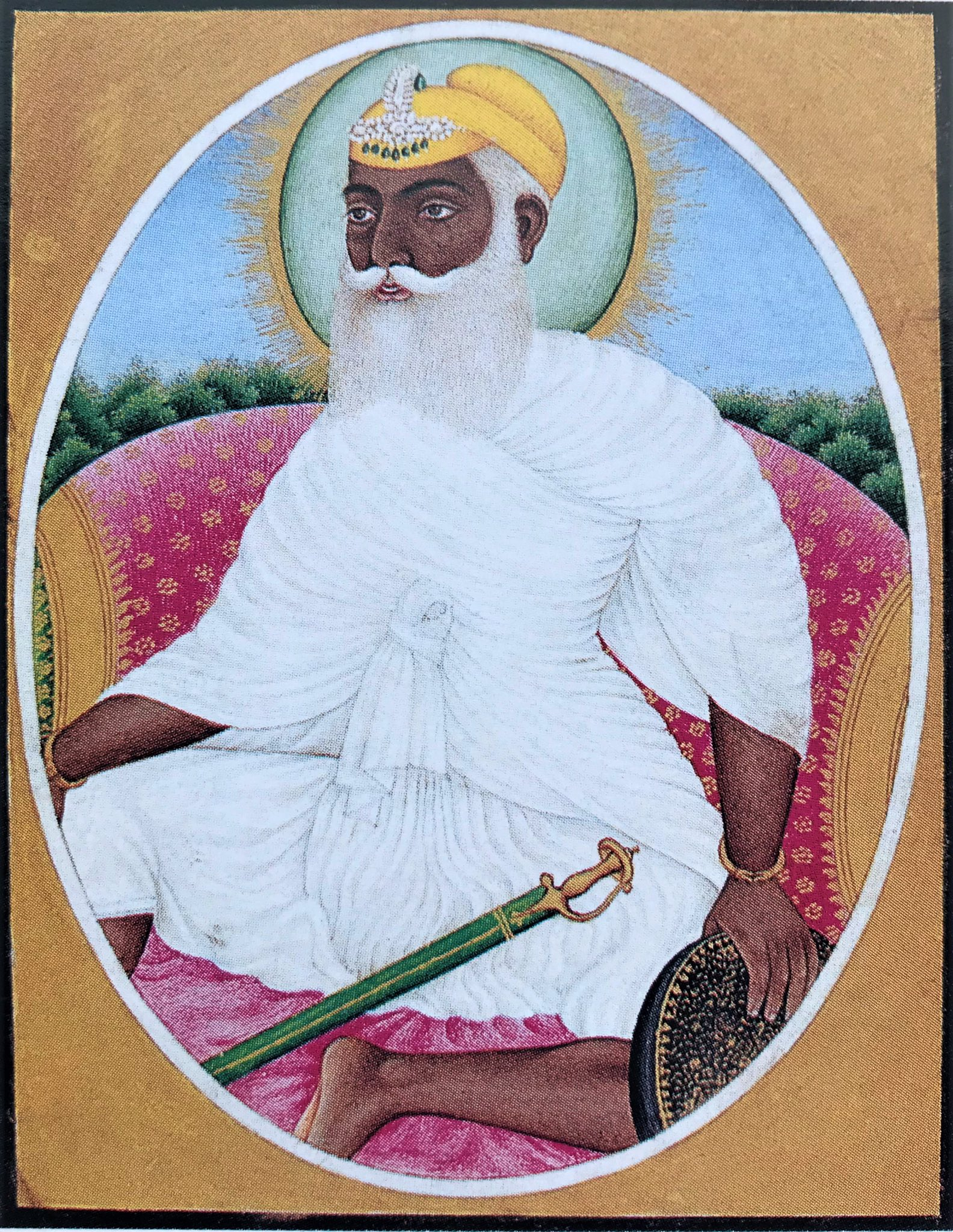
Painting of Ala Singh, whom Ahmad Shah had conferred the governorship of Sirhind

While beginning his return to Afghanistan, Ahmad Shah conferred Sirhind to Ala Singh, a Sikh who had submitted to him. Ala Singh submitted the same tribute as other governors, paying in subsidy 350,000 rupees annually. It was also believed the appointment would divide the Sikhs. This would later prove successful, as Ala Singh repelled an attack by the Dal Khalsa under Hari Singh Dhillon and had also killed him.

After crossing the Sutlej, the Afghan army was beset upon by the Sikhs, engaging in fierce fighting that saw both sides withdraw when nightfall came. On the second day a Sikh force attempted to harass the Afghan rear, but was repelled with the Sikhs suffering heavy casualties. Skirmishes on the third day saw the Sikhs continue hit-and-run tactics at Nurmahal, and a battle on the fourth day near Kapurthala saw the Afghans receive heavy casualties. A final battle on the seventh day took place on the Beas, which saw the Sikhs routed and pursued. Ahmad Shah completed his return to Afghanistan by the end of March, but suffered heavy casualties crossing the Chenab, with one author writing that the Afghans had suffered more casualties in the crossing than all of Ahmad Shah's battles with the Sikhs.

== Eighth invasion (1766–1767) ==
Upon returning to Afghanistan in March 1765, the Sikhs reoccupied Lahore and ousted the Shah's governor. As a result, Ahmad Shah began preparing for an eighth invasion of India. He had also been possibly invited by the vakil of Mir Qasim, the former ruler of Bengal until he was deposed by the British. Shah Wali Khan, however, wrote to Lord Clive and affirmed that the invasion was focused on the Sikhs.

In November 1766, Ahmad Shah launched his invasion. He forded the Indus River at Attock in December, and defeated a Sikh army under Ballam Singh at Behgy, near Rohtas. The Afghans continued their advance, encamping at Gujrat on 14 December, receiving many Muslim rulers in the region. Following this, Ahmad Shah defeated another attempt by the Sikhs to oppose him on the other side of the Jhelum River, continuing his advance by reaching Ghuinke, defeating a Sikh contingent in a fort there, and then reaching Eminabad.

The Shah reached Lahore on 22 December, finding that the Sikhs had deserted the city. The Afghans occupied the city, while Ahmad Shah dispatched a contingent of 1,500 toward Sirhind. The Sikhs under Charat Singh assembled a force of 20,000 men near Lahore, resulting in Ahmad Shah assembling his own host of 50,000 in response and dispatching Jahan Khan toward Amritsar, forcing the Sikhs to withdraw. This was followed by Ahmad Shah settling at Fatahabad on the 28th, south-east of Amritsar.

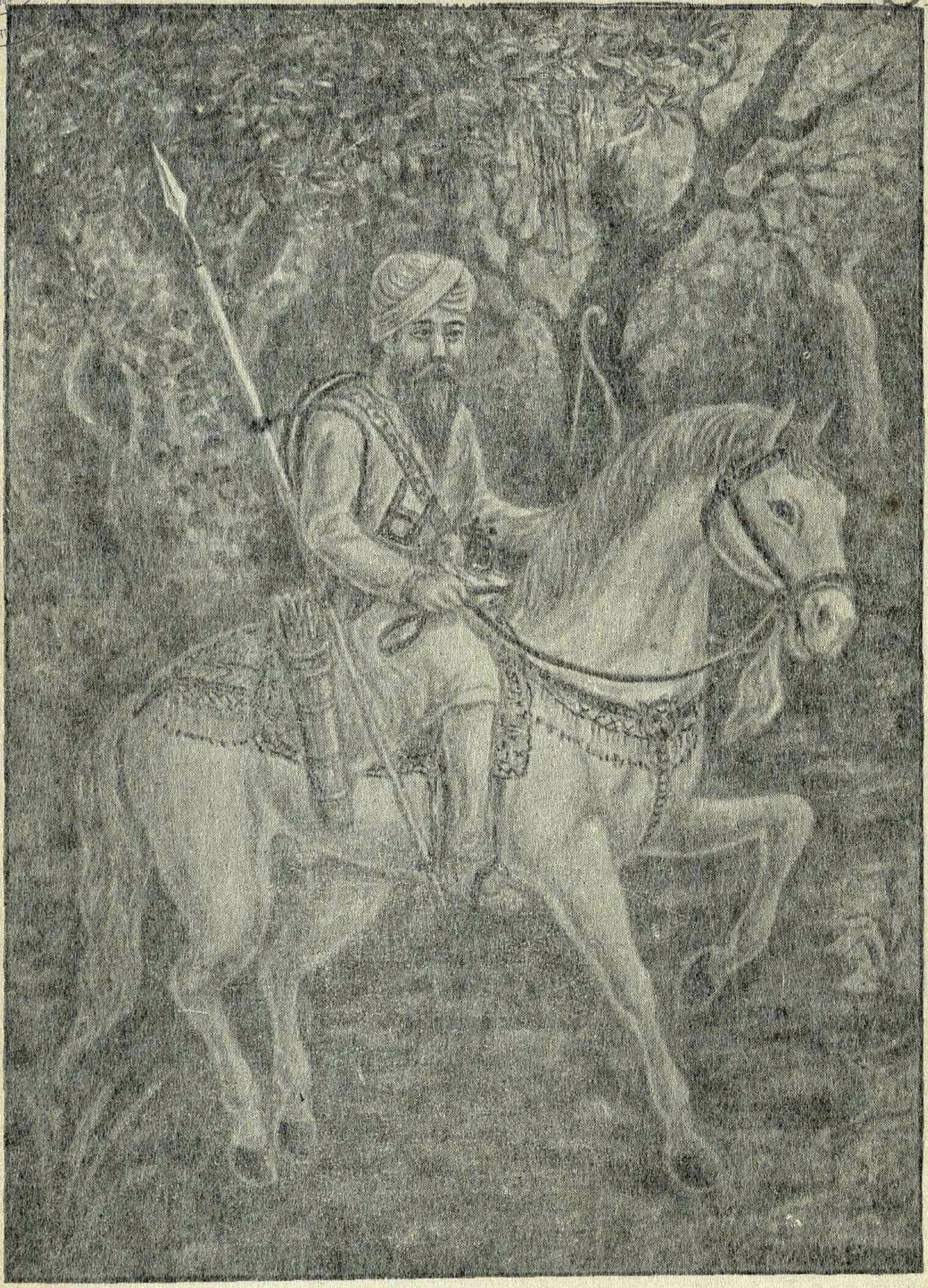
Depiction of Charat Singh

The Sikhs then made a raid on the Shah's baggage train at Lahore, before retreating as Ahmad Shah approached on 1 January 1767. Ahmad Shah offered peace to the Sikhs, intending to instead march on Northern India and offering to divide lands for them, lest they fight him in the field. The Sikhs rejected all offers, and defeated Jahan Khan at Amritsar on 17 January. Ahmad Shah quickly came to his aid and attacked the Sikhs, forcing them to flee and destroying Amritsar. The Afghan baggage train was attacked during this, but Nasir Khan routed and pursued the Sikh army.

After this, Ahmad Shah crossed the Beas River and received many sardars including Najib ud-Daula, as well as the vakils of Mir Qasim, the Jats, and Jaipur. Initially, as his invasion began, Ahmad Shah was surprised and infuriated that the chiefs of India who had sworn allegiance to him did not come to do homage to him personally. The British also had the Mughal Emperor Shah Alam and Vizier Shuja ud-Daula refrain from sending aid to the Shah, fearing advances further east of Delhi. The British also urged the Marathas, Rohillas, and Jats to thus form a coalition against Ahmad Shah, assuring British aid. Ahmad Shah, however, was seen as invincible in India following the victory at Panipat, with many chiefs being terrified of him.

Ahmad Shah continued his advance to Nurmahal, before reaching Machhiwara, where the Sikhs opposed his advance and harassed him. He attempted to pursue the Sikhs to no avail, while they inflicted a severe defeat on Nasir Khan. The Afghans continued and on 18 March, arrived at Ismailabad, south of Ambala. From there, Ahmad Shah declared his intention to march on Delhi, but this was opposed by Najib ud-Daula, saying that the countryside would flee upon his arrival. With the Sikhs also harassing the rear of his army, Ahmad Shah chose to withdraw and focus on the Sikhs.

After withdrawing to Sirhind, Ahmad Shah organized numerous campaigns against the Sikhs over a period of a month, while a large Sikh army at Mani Majra was defeated with many captured. While the Sikh holy cities of Kiratpur and Anandpur were sacked. During this time, Sikh forces began raiding Najib ud-Daula's domains, even storming Meerut on 14 May. Ahmad Shah dispatched Jahan Khan, who by forced march, traveled the distance of nearly 300 kilometers in three days and defeated the Sikhs at Meerut, before returning.

As the summer heat became unbearable, and the monsoon season nearing, Ahmad Shah withdrew by quick marches through Lahore back to Afghanistan. As he withdrew, Lahore was quickly reoccupied by the Sikhs.

== Ninth invasion (1768–1769) ==
In late 1768, Ahmad Shah attempted a ninth invasion of India. His forces advanced as far as the Jhelum River, but the Sikhs fell back and attacked him from all directions. No loot was able to be garnered, and internal disputes rose within the Afghan army, forcing a complete withdrawal. As he withdrew back between Peshawar and Kabul, the division in his army grew greater and his camp was plundered, with many killed as a result. This was the final invasion of India by Ahmad Shah, excluding three later attempts.

== Tenth, eleventh, and attempted twelfth invasions (1769–1771) ==
Between Late 1769 and Autumn 1771, Ahmad Shah attempted three more invasions of India. In December 1769, he advanced toward Peshawar but was unsure on how to reach Delhi, withdrawing back to Kandahar. In June 1770, Ahmad Shah again advanced to Peshawar, planning an invasion of India. However, undetermined to fight the Sikhs, he again withdrew. In August 1771, Ahmad Shah planned an invasion of India, with strong rumors circulating that Ahmad Shah would attack in the winter. This was unfound however, with Barker remarking that Ahmad Shah would not cross the Indus due to opposition by the Sikhs.

== Death of Abdali ==
Abdali died at Toba Mar (or Toba Maruf; present-day Maruf, Afghanistan) in the Suleiman Mountains on 16 October 1772 as a result of the injury he sustained while horse-riding in Kabul or demolishing the Golden Temple in Amritsar.

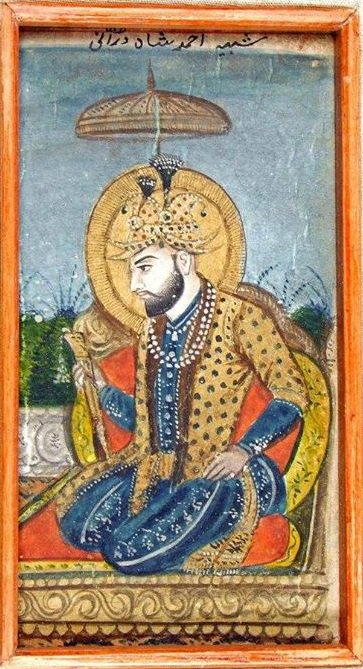
Miniature painting of Ahmad Shah Abdali painted in Lucknow, c. 1820

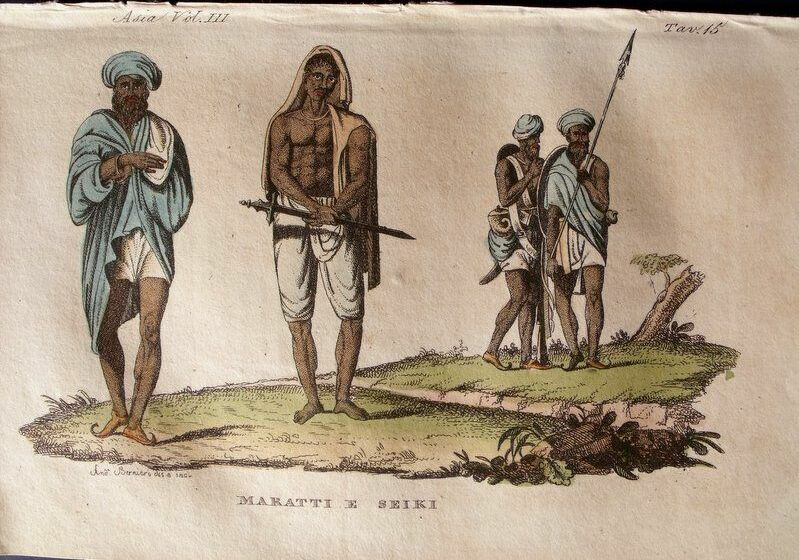
Marathas and Sikhs, by Giulio Ferrario, from 'Il costume antico e moderno', Florence, 1824

== See also ==
- Afghan-Sikh Wars
- Dal Khalsa (Sikh army)
- Nader Shah's invasion of India
