= Sack of Delhi (1757) =

Afghan sacking of Delhi in 1757

- Part of the Indian campaigns of Ahmad Shah Durrani
Date	28 January – 22 February 1757 (3 weeks and 4 days)
Location	Delhi, Mughal Empire 28°39′24″N 77°13′22″E
Result	Durrani victory
Territorial changes	Kashmir, Lahore, Multan, Sirhind, and all territories west of the Indus river are annexed by the Durrani Empire.

Belligerents
Durrani Empire	Mughal Empire; Bengal

Commanders and leaders
Ahmad Shah Durrani; Jahan Khan; Najib ud-Daula	Alamgir II (surrendered); Imad ul-Mulk (surrendered); Intizam-ud-Daulah (surrendered)

Strength
80,000 men	Unknown

Casualties and losses
- Civilians: Thousands killed

The sack of Delhi occurred from 28 January to 22 February 1757, carried out by the Durrani Empire under the Afghan King Ahmad Shah Durrani. Delhi, the capital of the Mughal Empire, experienced multiple invasions by the Afghans during the 18th century.

The decline of the Mughal Empire began with the death of Emperor Aurangzeb on 3 March 1707. The Mughals faced numerous invasions from the Maratha Empire and internal conflicts over succession. The Mughals continued declining under Muhammad Shah, allowing adventurers such as Nader Shah to invade Mughal territories and sack Delhi. Following Nader Shah's death, his eastern domains were taken over by Ahmad Shah Durrani, who formed the Durrani Empire and centered his power base in Kandahar, Afghanistan. After three invasions by the Afghans, the Mughals lost numerous territories including Kashmir, Punjab, and Sindh.

Invited to invade India in 1756, Ahmad Shah assembled his forces and overran the Punjab with an army of 80,000 men. After brushing aside light Maratha resistance, he reached Delhi on 28 January and soon forced the Mughal emperor Alamgir II to submit to him. The subsequent sack of Delhi, which ended on 22 February, yielded immense wealth, with estimates ranging from 30 million to as high as 300 million rupees worth of goods. It marked a significant blow to the already weakened Mughal Empire; months later, the Bengal Subah was subjugated by the British in the Battle of Plassey.

== Background ==
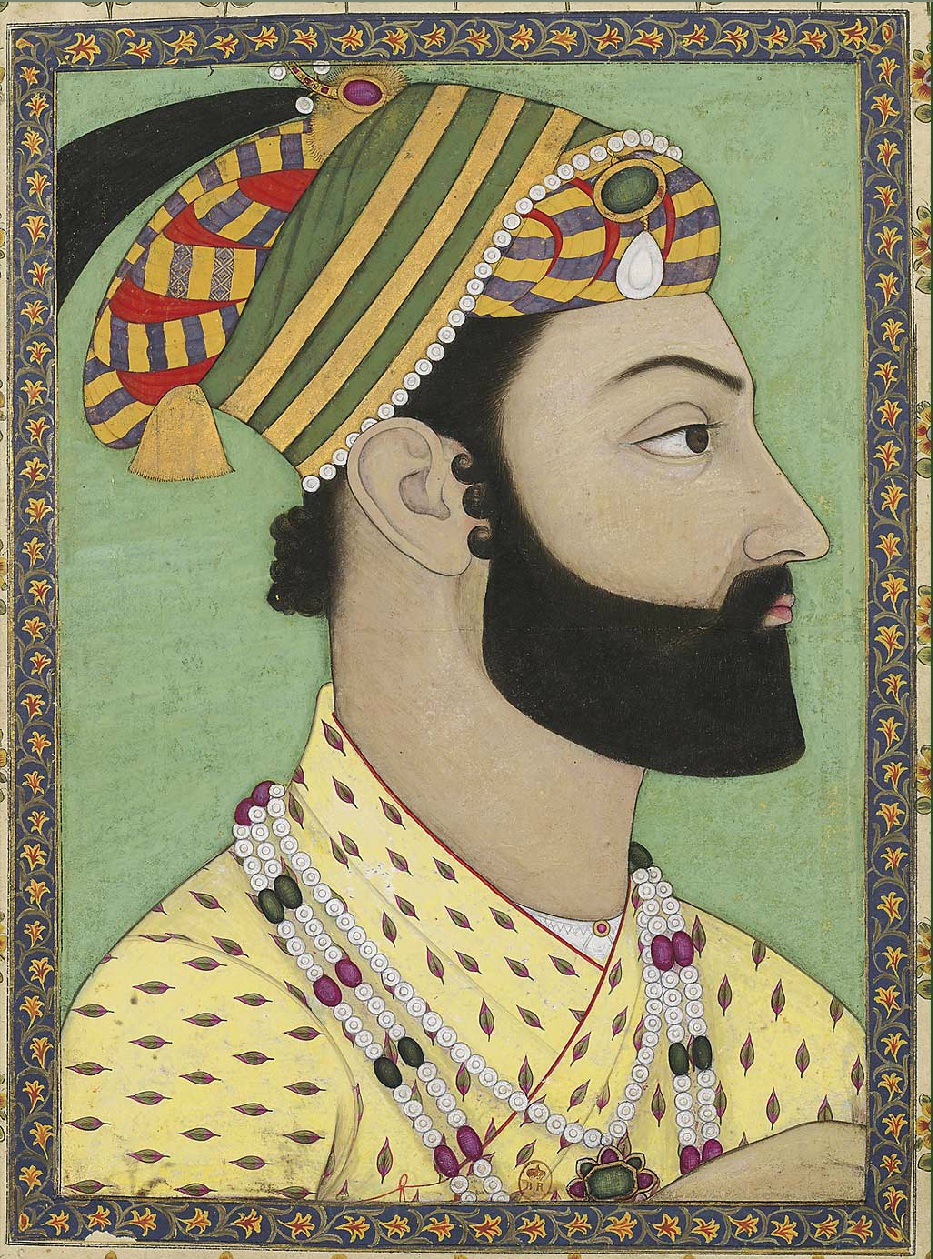
Portrait of Afghan emperor Ahmad Shah Durrani c.1757

Ahmad Shah Durrani, the ruler of the Durrani Empire, embarked on numerous campaigns into India during his reign. In 1747, he launched his first invasion, seizing Kabul and Peshawar from the Mughals before advancing into the Punjab. After defeating the Mughals at Lahore, Ahmad Shah met the Mughals at Manupur, where he was defeated.

Seeking to avenge his defeat, Ahmad Shah launched his second invasion in 1749, crossing the Indus River. Moin-ul-Mulk, the governor of the Punjab, urgently requested aid from the Mughals in Delhi. Opening peace negotiations, Ahmad Shah demanded the revenues of Chahar Mahal, Gujrat, Aurangabad, Pasrur, and Sialkot. Moin-ul-Mulk forwarded the demands to the Mughal emperor Ahmad Shah Bahadur. Instead of receiving reinforcements, Ahmad Shah Bahadur authorized the concessions to be given to the Afghans. Helpless, Moin-ul-Mulk had no choice but to accept the demands.

In November 1751, Ahmad Shah launched a third invasion after tribute was withheld. He initially demanded the revenues of Chahar Mahal, and Moin-ul-Mulk, unable to pay the full sum, gave a tribute of 900,000 rupees and promised more if the Afghans withdrew. Ahmad Shah took the tribute and continued advancing. Moin-ul-Mulk mobilized 50,000 men in response and entrenched himself at Shahdara, near Lahore. The Afghans bypassed his forces, prompting a Mughal retreat to Lahore, which was then besieged for four months. In March 1752, while attempting to relocate his camp, Moin-ul-Mulk's forces were defeated, and he was captured. Lahore was sacked, and its population massacred. Ahmad Shah confirmed Moin-ul-Mulk as the governor of Punjab under him, and annexed the region, along with Kashmir, in April 1752. Moin-ul-Mulk governed the Punjab until his death in November 1753, and was succeeded by Mughlani Begum. In March 1756, Mughal vizier Imad ul-Mulk imprisoned and replaced her with Adina Beg. Mughlani Begum pleaded the Afghans to lead another invasion, promising wealth.

== Invasion ==
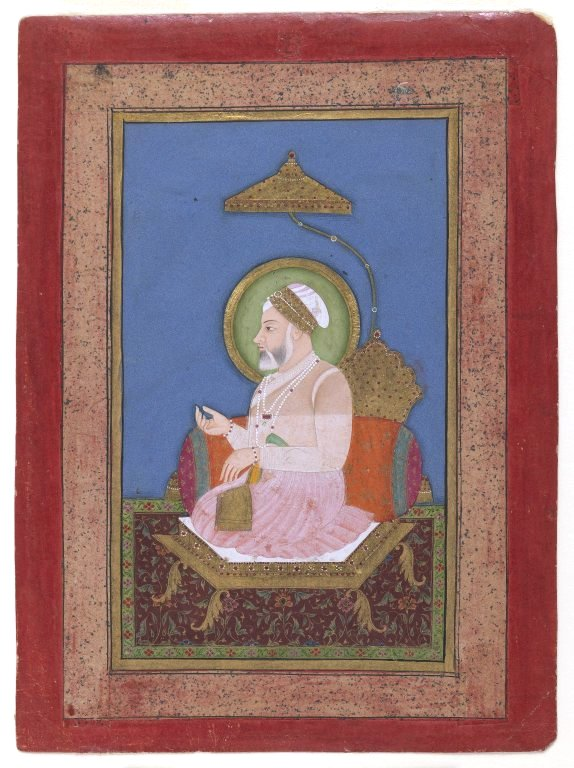
Portrait of Mughal emperor Alamgir II

Due to the tyrannies of Imad ul-Mulk, other nobles such as Najib ud-Daula, a chief of Rohilkand, and the new Mughal emperor Alamgir II, also requested Ahmad Shah to invade. Ahmad Shah accepted the invitations and began his fourth invasion in November 1756, leaving Peshawar on the 15th, and crossing Attock on the 26th with an army of 80,000 men. He reached Lahore on 20 December, seizing the city with little resistance. Ahmad Shah garnered tribute from the city before continuing his march, crossing the Sutlej on 10 January at Ludhiana, while the advance guard under his general, Jahan Khan, had seized Sirhind, Karnal, and Panipat.

The Marathas, who had signed a treaty to protect the Mughals from foreign invasions in 1752, assembled a contingent of 3,400 men under Antaji Mankeshwar, who skirmished with the Afghans at Narela. The Marathas were however, defeated and forced to withdraw with losses of 100 men. With this, Najib ud-Daula officially defected to the Afghans, and Imad ul-Mulk surrendered not long after. Jahan Khan advanced to Luni and besieged Shahdara following this on 17 January, and the Jama Masjid in Delhi saw Ahmad Shah's name read in the Khutbah as a sign of sovereignty. The Afghan forces continued advancing on Delhi, arriving before the city on 28 January.

== Sacking of Delhi ==
Meeting with Alamgir at the Fatehpuri Mosque, Ahmad Shah led a grand entry into Delhi, which was marked with a gun salute. However many inhabitants of the city had already fled or hidden, with the streets completely deserted. Many people barricaded themselves in their houses. Ahmad Shah's name was also inserted in the Khutbah for other mosques. Initially, the Afghan army was ordered not to sack the city.

Alamgir was placed under house arrest, and houses outside the city of Delhi were ravaged. On the 29th, bazaars were sacked and Jahan Khan's soldiers extracted tribute from Feroz Shah Kotla, a large fortress in Delhi. On 30 January, Ahmad Shah minted coins in his name, and married his son, Timur Shah Durrani, to a daughter of Alamgir II.

Ahmad Shah then ordered all Hindus to wear distinctive marks on their head, as well as forbidding non-Muslims from wearing the turban. Extortionate demands were also placed upon the Mughal nobility. Upon being refused, Ahmad Shah dispatched his own tax collectors, demanding additional tribute. Those suspected of concealing valuables were subjected to torture, including foot whipping. Many thousands died or were crippled as a result, while others resorted to suicide. Additionally, a tax was imposed on every household in Delhi.

During this, a Maratha force under Antaji Mankeshwar roving to the south, west, and north-west of the city, pillaging those who left the city. Antaji did this until his armies were routed on 1 February by the Afghans, compelling his retreat to Mathura.

Imad ul-Mulk was forced to hand over gold and ornaments valued at 10 million rupees, and another 300,000 gold coins. Intizam-ud-Daulah was summoned, and many of his assets were confiscated, including over 10 million rupees and 100 of his wives. Unable to produce the required wealth, Intizam admitted that his father had buried a fortune and revealed that an elderly woman, Sholapuri Begum, knew its location.

Sholapuri Begum, under threat of torture with iron pins, eventually revealed the location. After three days of digging, the Afghans recovered over 15 million rupees in cash, along with various goods, including 200 golden candles the size of a man. The wealth also included diamonds, rubies, pearls, and emeralds.

== Aftermath ==
After the sacking, Ahmad Shah campaigned against the Marathas and Jats until April 1757 when he began preparing to return to Afghanistan. Upon his return to Delhi in March, the city was sacked again. The Afghan invasion had dire consequences for the Mughal Empire, as most of their troops, along with some of the best from the Bengal Subah, were forcibly deployed against the Afghans. Mere months later, the army of the Bengal Subah, weakened due to the Afghan invasion, was completely defeated at the Battle of Plassey, beginning the rise of British power in India.

As a result, It has been argued that the strength of the British Royal Navy alone did not account for their success in India, which was also shaped by the disruptions caused by the Afghan invasion, political instability in the region, the consolidation of a base in Bengal, and access to South Asian resources and sepoy forces.

The total loot Ahmad Shah carried back to Afghanistan is disputed. Its been estimated from contemporary writers that the Afghans seized 30 to 300 million rupees worth of goods. Over 28,000 elephants, camels, and mules carried Ahmad Shah's loot, alongside his 80,000 men, who carried whatever they took, with many of the Afghan cavalry returning on foot, while they loaded loot unto their horses. The massacres done by the Afghans throughout the campaign made the Yamuna River flow red with blood for two weeks.
