= Battle of the Ravi Ford =

1762 battle in the Afghan-Sikh wars

- Part of Afghan–Sikh Wars
Date	12 December 1762
Location	Ravi River
Result	Durrani victory

Belligerents
Durrani Empire	Sikh Misls

Commanders and leaders
Ahmad Shah Durrani	Unknown

Strength
12,000	Unknown

Casualties and losses
Unknown	Unknown

The Battle of the Ravi Ford took place on 12 December 1762 between Afghans and Sikhs on the Ravi River. Ahmad Shah Durrani was seeking to return to Afghanistan after campaigning in the Punjab. While his forces crossed the ford of the Ravi River, they were ambushed by Sikh armies. The Afghans defeated the Sikhs in the engagement and successfully crossed the river.

== Background ==
Ahmad Shah Durrani was leading his sixth invasion of India. After his campaign, his forces traveled through the Punjab and began crossing the Ravi River to return to Afghanistan, when suddenly they were ambushed.

== Battle ==
Ahmad Shah's forces had begun crossing the Ravi River, when they were ambushed and the Sikhs began seizing much of the Afghan luggage train. Ahmad Shah stood on the bank of the river with his personal contingent of 12,000 men but did not engage in any skirmish until all troops crossed the river. The Afghan forces crossed the river but the Sikhs only continued to grow bolder in their hit and run attacks. Eventually, the Sikhs rode close to Ahmad Shah's camp and unloaded matchlocks near it. After finishing his afternoon prayer, Ahmad Shah rode on horseback with his men and attacked the Sikhs, beginning battle.

Ahmad Shah's troops were quick and made a sally with drawn swords, charging the Sikh forces. With this, the Sikhs retreated from the battlefield, and Ahmad Shah did not pursue them.

== Aftermath ==
Ahmad Shah Durrani returned to Afghanistan following this, and would not return to Punjab until his seventh invasion in 1764–1765.
