= Battle of Narela (1757) =

1757 battle in Delhi

- Part of the Afghan–Maratha conflicts
Date	16 January 1757
Location	Narela, Outskirts of Delhi
Result	Durrani victory

Belligerents
Durrani Empire	Maratha Empire

Commanders and leaders
Sardar Jahan Khan	Antaji Mankeshwar

Strength
Unknown	3,400 cavalry

Casualties and losses
Unknown	100 men and horses

The Battle of Narela took place on 16 January 1757, at Narela, on the outskirts of Delhi, between the Maratha Army led by Antaji Mankeshwar and an army of Ahmad Shah Abdali.

== Background ==
Ahmad Shah Durrani, the emperor of Afghanistan was heading towards Delhi, for yet another invasion. The Marathas had signed a treaty with the Mughal Emperor in 1752 to give him protection from the foreign invader. The Maratha Peshwa had appointed Antaji Mankeshwar along with 50,000 strong Maratha force to guard the emperor. However, the Maratha troops were called back by the Peshwa for the Deccan operations. As a result, most of the Maratha force left Delhi leaving behind some 3,400 troops under Antaji Mankeshwar.

== Battle ==
The small garrison of Marathas along with the forces of Imad-ul-Mulk and Najib-ud-daula had the responsibility to guard the Mughal capital from Durrani. Antaji was asked to move along with his contingent along the road towards Karnal to check the progress of the Afghan invader. The Marathas and Afghans collided in a fierce battle in Narela, on the outskirts of Delhi.

== Aftermath ==
Later at night, Antaji was returning from Narela when his troops were intercepted by a huge army on the outskirts of Delhi in the night of 16–17 January. The Marathas were completely taken by surprise, but they fought desperately and hurriedly retreated towards Faridabad, 30 km from Delhi with heavy losses. The next day, it became known that the unidentified foe who had treacherously lead a surprise attack on the Marathas, the night before was Najib-ud-daula, a courtier of the Mughal emperor. Najib betrayed the emperor and his wazir at the most critical time and moved out of Delhi with his 20,000 well equipped troops to join the invader's camp. As a result, Abdali entered Delhi with Najib-ud-Daula on 28 January 1757, and taken to the Red Fort unopposed by the Mughal Emperor in humility. The Mughal Emperor was arrested and Najib was put in charge of the administration of Delhi.

== See also ==
- Battle of Narela (1452)

== Bibliography ==
- Jaswant Lal Mehta (2005). Advanced study in the history of modern India 1707-1813. Sterling Publishers Pvt. Ltd. p. 225. ISBN 1-932705-54-6.
- Robinson, Howard; James Thomson Shotwell (1922). "Mogul Empire and the Marathas". The Development of the British Empire. Houghton Mifflin. p. 134.
- Pradeep P. Barua (2005). "Marathas at Panipat". The State at War in South Asia. U of Nebraska Press. ISBN 0803213441.
- Jadunath Sarkar (1966). Fall of the Mughal Empire, Vol. 2. M. C. Sarkar.
