= Itimad-ad-Daula, Qamar-ud-Din Khan =

Itimad-ud-daula, Qamar-ud-din Khan Mir Muhammad Fazil
- Grand Vizier of the Mughal Empire Itimad ud Daula, Qamar-ud-din Khan
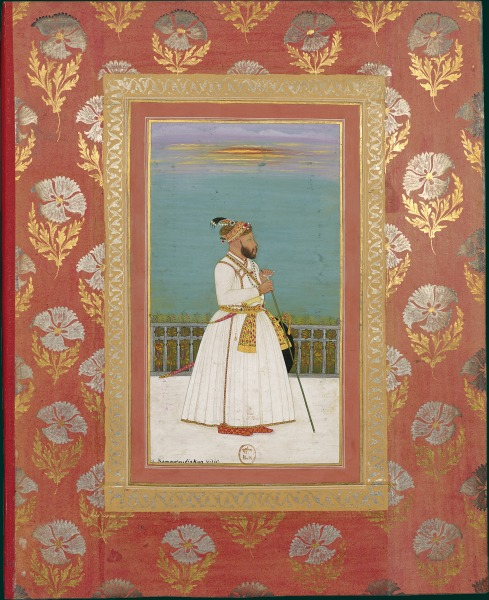
- A portfolio of Nawab Qamar-ud-din Khan

Grand Vizier of the Mughal Empire
- Tenure: 31 July 1724 – 11 March 1748
- Predecessor: Nizam al Mulk, Qamar ud Din, Asaf Jah I
- Born: Mir Muhammad Fazil
- Died: 11 March 1748
- Issue: Intizam-ud-Daulah; Moin-ul-Mulk; Mir Fakhruddin Hasan, married a niece of Khan Dowran VII; A daughter, married Yahya Khan; A daughter, married Rayat Khan
Names
- Itimad ud Daula, Nawab Qamar-ud-din Khan, Mir Muhammad Fazil
Regnal name
- Itimad ud Daula
- Father: Muhammad Amin Khan Turani
- Religion: Islam
- Occupation: Politician

Mian Muhammad Fazil (died 11 March 1748) was a Mughal nobleman and the Grand Vizier of the Mughal Empire from 1724 until his death in 1748.

== Biography ==
He was born in India to Muhammad Amin Khan Turani.

At the close of the reign of the Emperor Aurangzeb he was able to obtain satisfactory rank and was titled as Qamarudin Khan. In the reign of the Emperor Furrukhsiyar he was appointed as Bakshi of Ahadis and later led an expedition against the Sikhs along with Abdus Samad Khan Diler Jang. In the beginning of the reign of the Emperor Muhammad Shah, (sometime after the killing of Hussain Ali Khan under his father's direction), he repelled an assault on Imperial troops and showed immense valour, for which he was bestowed a mansab of 6000, the office of second Bakshi (his father's former appointment which had become vacant upon his resignation) and the position of "Darogah e Ghusl Khana".

At the death of his father, Muhammad Amin Khan, who was then serving as Grand Vizier was replaced by Nizam al Mulk Qamar-ud-din Asaf Jah I who was summoned to court, Qamar Ud Din Khan was further elevated in rank and granted his father's title of Itimad ud Daula. Later Asaf Jah found the court atmosphere to be too hedonistic and debauched for his personal liking and subsequently resigned from the office of Grand Vizier. Upon which the office of grand vizier came to Qamar Ud Din Khan.

His reign as Grand Vizier was largely un-eventful, and he enjoyed his office with happiness except for some excursions against the Marathas in the Malwa subah. Along with another occasion in which he marched with Safdar Jang, Umdat al Mulk and the Emperor Muhammad Shah against Ali Mohammad Khan Rohilla. However, upon finding Ali Mohammad Khan to be a suitable check against Safdar Jang whom he despised. Qamar-ud-din Khan helped Ali find employment in Imperial Services and helped his rehabilitation and eventual appointment as governor of Sirhind. A son of his was further engaged to a daughter of Nawab Ali Mohammad Khan.

== Death ==
He led an army against Ahmed Shah Abdali and while encamped and praying, he was struck by a cannonball causing his death.

== Personality ==
He was generally regarded as a "lover of comfort" with a "pleasant disposition" and generally liked by both the higher and lower rungs of society. He did not agree in harming anyone and to that extent he compensated owners whose properties had been confiscated by his oppressive father. Those who did not agree with the suitable compensation had their property returned. He was polite and courteous to the extent that whenever Qamarudin Asaf Jah I visited Delhi, he would get up to greet him in respect of the latter's age and despite his own office as Grand Vizier.

== Gallery ==
Depictions of Itimad-ad-Daula, Qamar-ud-Din Khan
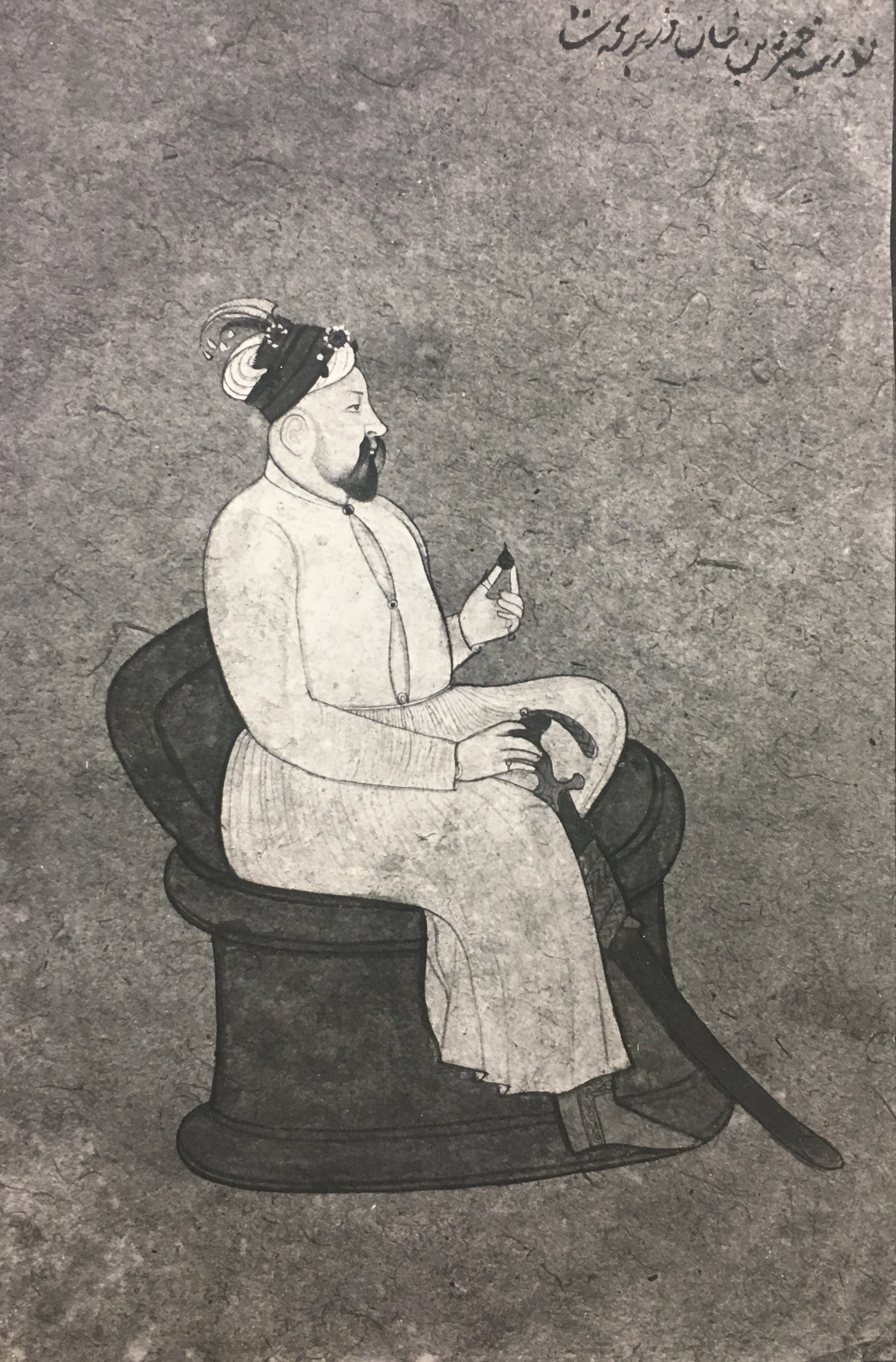
An elderly Qamar-ud-Din Khan

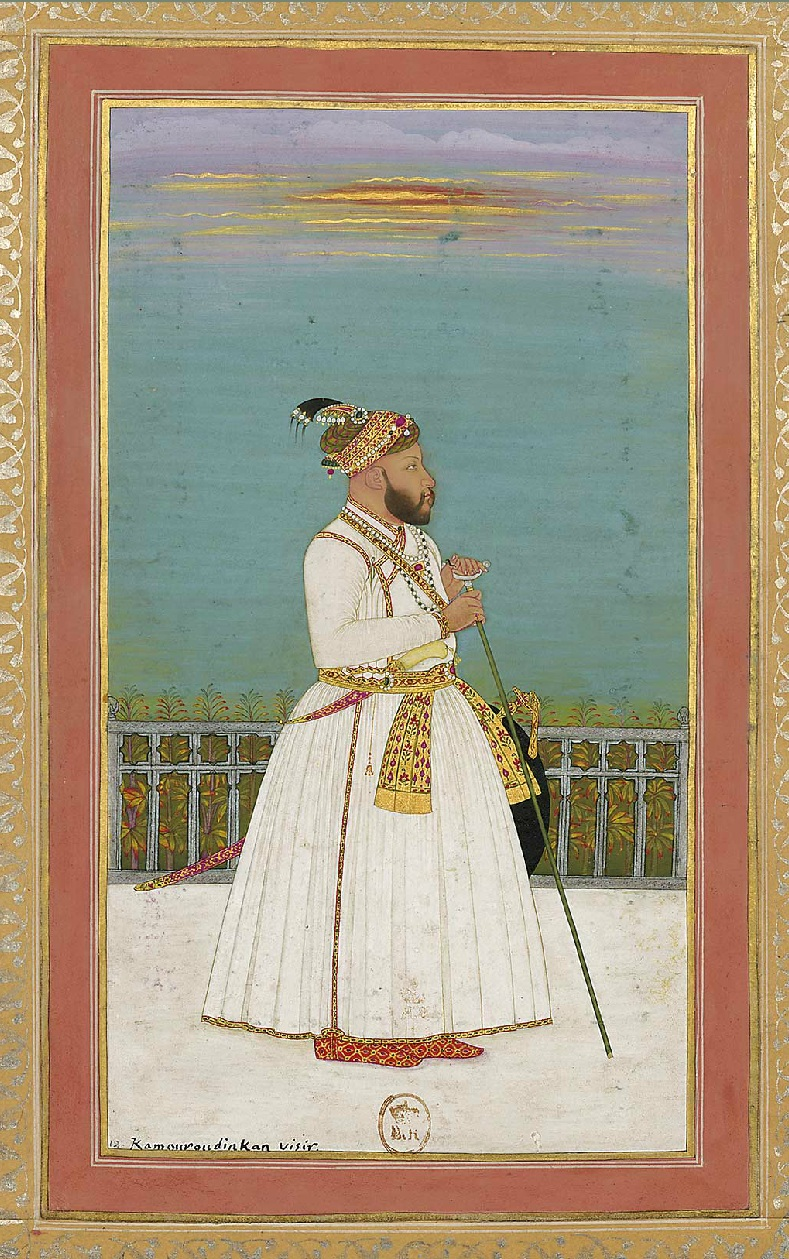
Qamar-ud-Din Khan
