= Sambhalka =

Sambhal
- city
- Location in India
- Coordinates: 29°37′N 76°56′E
- Country: India
- State: Delhi
- District: South West

Population (2001)
  - Total: 11,064

Languages
  - Official: Hindi, English
- Time zone: UTC+5:30 (IST)

Sambhal is a census town in South West district in the Indian state of Delhi.

== Demographics ==
As of 2001 India census, Sambhal had a population of 2,11,064. Males constitute 61% of the population and females 39%. Sambhal has an average literacy rate of 60%, higher than the national average of 59.5%: male literacy is 68%, and female literacy is 47%. In Sambhal, 18% of the population is under 6 years of age.
