= Ghuinke =

Ghuinke گھوينکی
- Town
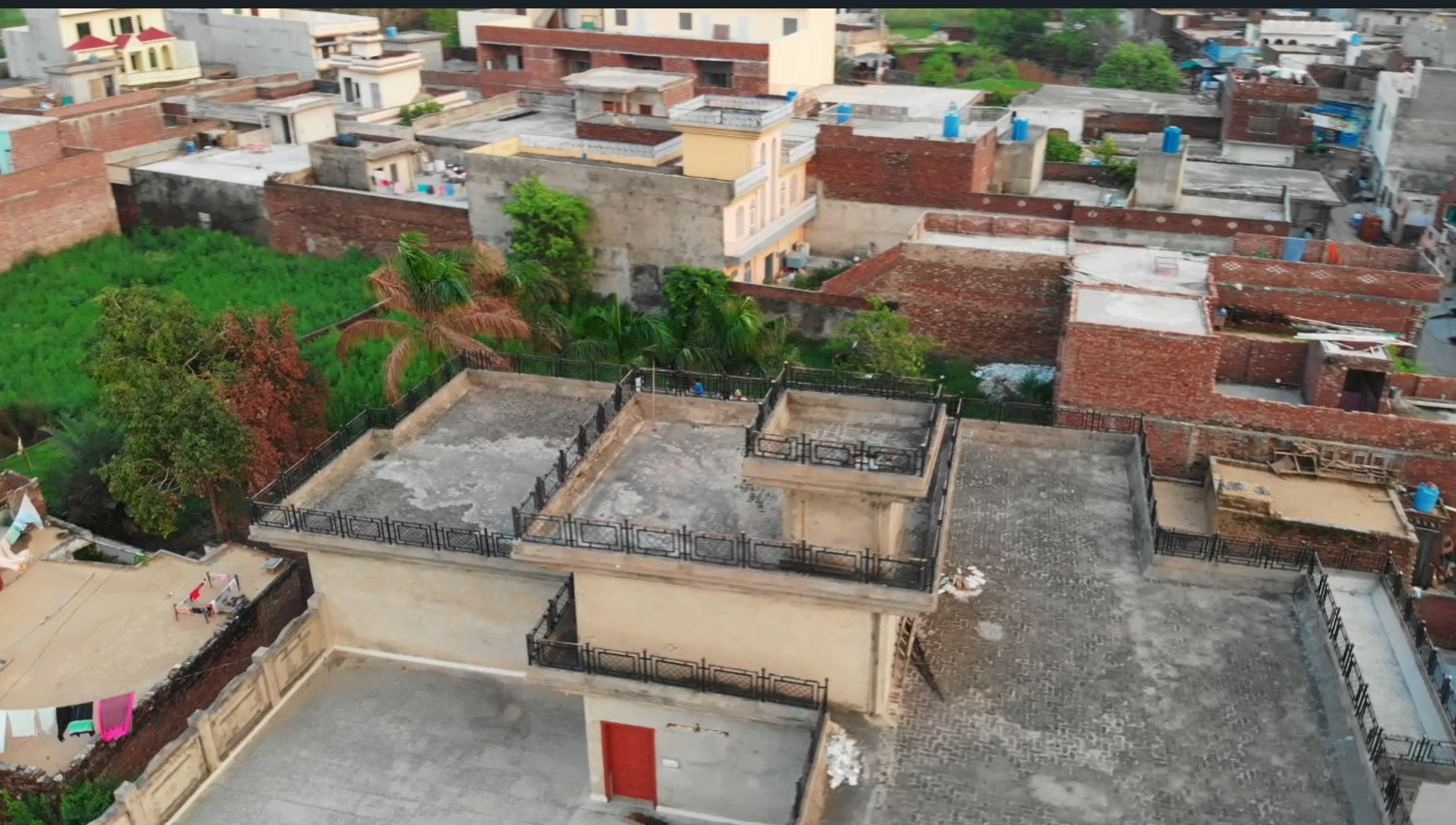

- Location in Pakistan Ghuinke (Pakistan)
- Coordinates: 32°25′28″N 74°27′37″E
- Country: Pakistan
- Province: Punjab
- District: Sialkot

Area
  - Total: 5 km^{2} (1.9 sq mi)
- Elevation: 243 m (797 ft)

Population (2017)
  - Total: 32,000
  - Density: 6,400/km^{2} (17,000/sq mi)
- Time zone: UTC+5 (PST)
- Postal code: 51040
- Calling code: 052
- Climate: Cwa
- Union council: UC46

Ghuinke (Punjabi and Urdu: گھوينکی) is a village in Daska Tehsil of Sialkot District, in the Punjab province of Pakistan.

== Distance from main cities ==
- Gujranwala: 40 km. Lahore: 107 km.
- Faisalabad: 172 km. Sargodha: 173 km.
- Islamabad: 194 km. Rawalpindi: 184 km.
- Peshawar: 327 km. Multan: 377 km.
- Bahawalpur: 430 km. Hyderabad: 983 km.
- Quetta: 751 km. Karachi: 1108 km.

== Schools ==
=== Govt. Higher Secondary School Ghuinke ===
Govt. Higher Secondary School Ghuinke is located in Sialkot District. There are total 757 scholars and 37 preceptors, and 18 classrooms in the academy. There is no computer lab or library. Amjad Ali is the principle of the academy.

=== Govt. Girls high School Ghuinke ===
Govt Girls High School Ghuinke is located in Sialkot District. There are total 952 scholars and 25 preceptors, and 12 classrooms in the academy. There's no computer lab or computer scholars, and no library for scholars is available. Nosheen Zahra is the principle of the academy.

== Nearby Airports ==
=== Sialkot International Airport ===
Sialkot International Airport is located 14 km( 8.7 mi) west of Sialkot Pakistan. This is the country's first private airport and It was built by the business community of Sialkot. Before the completion of the new Islamabad International Airport, Sialkot International Airport had the longest runway in Pakistan. The runway of Sialkot International Airport is 3600 meters long and 45 meters wide.

=== Allama Iqbal International Airport ===
Allama Iqbal International Airport is the third largest International Airport, after Jinnah International Airport Karachi and Islamabad International Airport. It serves Lahore and a large portion of the travellers from the other regions of Punjab province. Allama Iqbal International Airport has three terminals.

1. Allama Iqbal terminal.
2. Hajj terminal.
3. Cargo terminal.
