= Intizam-ud-Daulah =

Mughal grand vizier from 1753 to 1754

Intizam-ud-Daulah (died 29 November 1759) was a Grand Vizier during the reign of the Mughal Emperor Ahmad Shah Bahadur.

He was the eldest son of Qamar-ud-Din Khan and older brother of Moin-ul-Mulk. He was a pupil of Mirza Mazhar Jan-e-Janaan, one of the four pillars of Urdu poetry, and wrote verses in Persian and Urdu, and had perfect skill in this art. During the wazirate of Safdar Jung he led the Turani opposition and played a significant role in his dismissal. He was subsequently appointed to replace Safdar Jung as Grand Vizier in 1753. He resigned in 1754 following pressure from his nephew Imad-ul-Mulk and Malhar Rao Holkar.

In 1759 he was murdered together with Alamgir II, at the instigation of Imad-ul-Mulk, and his body was thrown in a river. His son, Fakhr-ud-Daulah fled to Hyderabad and obtained an office under the Nizam of Hyderabad, Asaf Jah II.
