= Battle of Achal =

Battle in 1785

Date	1785
Location	Achal, Batala, Punjab
Result	Sukerchakia-Allied victory
Territorial changes	Jassa Singh Ramgarhia and Sansar Chand Katoch recover their lost territories from the Kanhaiya Misl

Belligerents
Sukerchakia Misl; Ramgarhia Misl; Kangra State	Kanhaiya Misl

Commanders and leaders
Maha Singh; Jassa Singh; Sansar Chand	Jai Singh (WIA); Gurbaksh Singh †

Strength
Unknown	Unknown

Casualties and losses
Unknown	Unknown

The Battle of Achal, also known as the Battle of Randpura, was fought in Achal, near Batala, in 1785 between the Sukerchakia Misl, Ramgarhia Misl and Sansar Chand, against the Kanhaiya Misl. The Battle resulted in the Kanhaiyas retreating which allowed for the Ramgarhias and their Hill allies regaining their lost territories.

== Background ==
In 1778, a quarrel arose between Jassa Singh Ramgarhia, Jai Singh Kanhaiya and Haqiqat Singh Kanhaiya. Supported by Jassa Singh Ahluwalia, Afghans attacked Jassa Singh Ramgarhia and exiled him to the deserts of Hansi and Hisar. He set up his headquarters at Tosham.

In January 1784, Haqiqat Singh Kanhaiya and Maha Singh made a pact to attack and share the wealth, but Maha Singh did it alone. He plundered Jammu for three days and nights, killing thousands of men. The booty was worth more than one crore. Haqiqat Singh was deeply shocked at this treachery and died soon afterward. The death of Haqiqat Singh was a great loss to Jai Singh. He demanded half of the booty from Maha Singh for Haqiqat Singh’s son, Jaimal Singh, which Maha Singh refused. On Diwali in 1784, the Sikh chiefs gathered at Amritsar. Jai Singh Kanhaiya behaved coldly toward Maha Singh, refused his attempts to reconcile, and called him a “dancing boy.” Maha Singh took this insult to heart and attacked Kanhaiya’s camp outside Amritsar, and Jai Singh pursued him. A further engagement took place near Majitha. Jai Singh was forced to seek shelter inside the besieged town. He escaped to Jalandhar and prepared his army for battle against Maha Singh.

== Battle ==
Mahan Singh, aligned himself with Jai Singh’s adversaries, Sansar Chand and Jassa Singh Ramgarhia. Ramgarhia responded without delay, departing Tosham in February and setting up camp near Jagraon. With Jassa Singh Ahluwalia no longer alive and his successor, Bhag Singh Ahluwalia, having opted for neutrality, Jai Singh attempted to block Ramgarhia’s progress. Nevertheless, their armies came to blows on the right bank of the Satluj River, where the Kanhaiya forces suffered a defeat.

Seizing the momentum, Ramgarhia advanced across the Heas River without significant resistance. Meanwhile, Sansar Chand positioned his forces at Dinanagar, situated roughly eighty-two kilometers north of Amritsar. The allied forces of Mahan Singh and Ramgarhia converged near Amritsar, further strengthened by the defection of Amar Singh Bagga, a former Kanhiya associate and aide to Jai Singh. Together, they marched toward Batala.

The decisive confrontation unfolded at Randpura village near Achal. In a fierce engagement lasting six hours, Jai Singh’s eldest son, Gurbaksh Singh Kanhaiya, was killed by an arrow fired by one of Guru Sundar Das’s men. Stricken with grief, Jai Singh laid down his arms and offered himself up, ready to meet his end. However, he was shielded and led to safety by his loyal companions, Tara Singh and Jaimal Singh. Gurbaksh Singh’s widow, Sada Kaur, escaped the battlefield in disguise. Barefoot and determined, she made her way to the fort at Sohian. Jassa Singh Ramgarhia recovered his lost territories and established his headquarters at Batala.

== Aftermath ==
After the Battle of Achal, Jai Singh Kanhaiya retired to Naushera where he reorganized his force for a fresh struggle. Jassa Singh Ramgarhia and Sansar Chand Katoch occupied their former possessions. Maha Singh remained in the field. Another battle was fought between Maha Singh and Jai Singh Kanhaiya at Naushera. Both sides sustained heavy losses, but Jai Singh Kanhaiya suffered a defeat. He escaped to his fort of Nurpur Maha. Singh pursued him and laid siege to the fort. Maha Singh did not like to stay at a distant place, so he raised the siege and turned homeward. Maha Singh seized Kanhaiya territories worth three lakhs a year.

Sada Kaur, the widow of Gurbaksh Singh Kanhaiya, found it in the interest of the Kanhaiya Misl to bring about reconciliation with the Sukerchakia Misl. She made up her mind to get her only child, Mehtab Kaur, brothered to Maha Singh's only son, Ranjit Singh. She prevailed upon Jai Singh to approve of her proposal. Then she deputed Amar Singh Kingra to Maha Singh to consider the overture. She learned that Maha Singh's wife Raj Kaur had gone to Jawalamukhi on a pilgrimage to pray for the recovery of Ranjit Singh from smallpox. She immediately went there and persuaded the lady to accept her proposal, In 1786 Mehtab Kaur was married to Ranjit Singh who was only six years old, when the Sukerchakia and Kanhaiya Misls were allied through that matrimony.
