= Battle of Pathankot (1775) =

1775 campaign in Punjab

Battle of Dinanagar
- Part of Sikh Interwarfare
Date	1775
Location	Dinanagar, Punjab
Result	Kanhaiya Coalition victory; Near collapse of the Bhangi Misl

Belligerents
Kanhaiya Misl; Sukerchakia Misl; Ahluwalia Misl	Bhangi Misl; Ramgarhia Misl; Jammu; Chatthas

Commanders and leaders
Jai Singh Kanhaiya; Haqiqat Singh Kanhaiya; Jassa Singh Ahluwalia	Ganda Singh Bhangi †; Charat Singh Bhangi †; Gujjar Singh Bhangi; Lehna Singh Bhangi; Raja Ranjit Dev; Pir Muhammad Chattha; Jassa Singh Ramgarhia

The Battle of Pathankot, also known as the Battle of Dinanagar, took place in 1775 near Awankha in pargana Dina Nagar. It was fought between a coalition led by the Bhangi Misl under Ganda Singh Bhangi and the combined forces of the Kanhaiyas, Sukarchakias, and Ahluwalias during ongoing territorial disputes among the Sikh Misls. The Kanhaiya-led coalition emerged victorious, retaining control of Pathankot. This victory weakened the Bhangi Misl's influence and strengthened the Kanhaiya's territorial claims.

== Background ==
After the Battle of Jammu in 1774, the Bhangi and Kanhaiya Misls resumed their hostilities. The dispute over the jagir of Pathankot, granted by Jhanda Singh Bhangi, the chief of the Bhangi Misl, to one of his sardars, Nand Singh, also known as Mansa Singh, formed the root cause of the dispute. After the death of Nand Singh, his wife, Mai Jashon, settled the marriage of her daughter with Tara Singh, a leading chief of the Kanhaiya Misl and brother of Haqiqat Singh Kanhaiya. Along with the dowry, Mai Jashon granted the jagir of Pathankot to her son-in-law, Tara Singh.

This transfer enraged Ganda Singh Bhangi, who had succeeded his elder brother Jhanda Singh as the chief of the Bhangi Misl, for he considered Pathankot a rightful possession of the Bhangis granted to him by his late brother and demanded its restitution at the hands of the Kanhayas. His rage was further combined by the desire to avenge the death of Jhanda Singh, which, he believed, was treacherously caused by the Kanhaiyas.

The situation deteriorated when Tara Singh allegedly murdered his mother-in-law and wife to deter the Bhangi chiefs, fearing that Mai Jashon might revoke the grant under their pressure. This incident only strengthened Ganda Singh’s determination to reclaim the jagir, though the Kanhaiyas refused to relinquish Pathankot. Battle preparations were carried out under the leadership of Gurbaksh Singh Kanhaiya, son of Jai Singh Kanhaiya, alongside Haqiqat Singh Kanhaiya, Tara Singh Kanhaiya, and Amar Singh Bhugga.

== Battle ==
Jassa Singh Ramgarhia, who was on hostile terms with Jai Singh Kanhaiya, incited Ganda Singh to attack the Kanhaiyas. Thereupon, Ganda Singh, being joined by Gujjar Singh Bhangi, Lehna Singh Bhangi, Bhag Singh Chamyari, Pir Muhammad Khan Chatha and Ranjit Dev of Jammu, with Jassa Singh Ramgarhia, marched against the combined forces of the Kanhaiyas, Sukarchakias and Ahluwalias. Ganda Singh carried the Zamzama gun with him.

The two armies clashed at Sundar Chak, near the village of Awanak in the parganah of Dinanagar, about 25 kilometers south of Pathankot. The battle raged on for ten days of continuous fighting. Thereafter, heavy rains started and continued non-stop for over a month and a half, seriously hindering military movements. During this period, the Bhangi Misl suffered a major setback with the death of their Misaldar, Ganda Singh Bhangi, due to illness. Since Ganda Singh's son, Desa Singh, was still a minor, the leadership of the misl passed to his nephew, Charat Singh Bhangi.

The leadership of Charat Singh Bhangi was short-lived, as he was killed in the continued battle. The Bhangi forces were much affected by the successive loss and soon had a morale breakdown, withdrawing from the battlefield.

== Aftermath ==
Following these events, Ganda Singh's young son, Desa Singh, was eventually appointed leader of the Bhangi Misl, having earlier been overlooked due to his youth. Without the strength and capability of his father, the central authority disintegrated, prompting several sardars to declare independence. This fragmentation weakened the cohesion and strength of the misl. Tribute payments from Jhang were stopped, and the control of Multan was lost to further weaken the power and territorial control of the misl.

== Works cited ==
- Siṅgha, Bhagata (1993). A History of the Sikh Misals. Punjab (India): Publication Bureau, Punjabi University.
- Gandhi, Surjit Singh (1999). Sikhs in the Eighteenth Century: Their Struggle for Survival and Supremacy. Singh Bros. ISBN 9788172052171.
- Gupta, Hari Ram (1939). History of the Sikhs: Trans-Sutlej Sikhs, 1769-1799. Punjab: S.N. Sarkar.
- Chhabra, G.S. (1960). The Advanced Study in History of the Punjab, Volume 1. Punjab (India): Sharanjit.
- Gupta, Hari Ram (1999). History Of The Sikhs: The Sikh Commonwealth Or Rise And Fall Of Sikh Misls, Vol. Iv (3, illustrated ed.). Munshiram Manoharlal Publishers. ISBN 9788121501651.
- Singh, Dalbir (2010). Rise, Growth and Fall of Bhangi Misal (Thesis). Department of History, Punjabi University Patiala.
