= Kanhaiya Misl =

Sovereign state of the Sikh Confederacy (1748–1801)

Kanhaiya Misl Kanaihya Misal
- 1748–1801
- Capital: Sohian (initial) Batala (later) Mukerian (later)
- Common language: Punjabi
- Religion: Sikhism (rulers); Islam (majority); Hinduism
- Sardar
  - 1748–1789: Jai Singh Kanhaiya
  - 1789–1801: Sada Kaur
- Historical era: Early modern period
  - Split from Singhpuria Misl: 1748
  - Merged into the Sikh Empire: 1801
Preceded by	Succeeded by
Mughal Empire; Singhpuria Misl	Sikh Empire
- Today part of: Pakistan, India

The Kanhaiya Misl was one of the twelve misls of the Sikh Confederacy. It had been founded by Jai Singh Kanhaiya.

== History ==
Jai Singh Sandhu (son of Khushal Singh) of the village Kanha (district Lahore) was the founder of this Misl; hence the misl came to known as Kanhaiya Misl; another founder leader of this Misl was Amar Singh of Kingra village. The misl was founded by Jats. Jai Singh and his brother Jhanda Singh had got initiation from the jatha of (Nawab) Kapur Singh; when all the Sikh Jathas were organised into 11 Misls, Jai Singh’s jatha was named as Kanhaiya Misl.

Haqiqat Singh Kanhaiya, Jeewan Singh, Tara Singh and Mehtab Singh (all four from village Julka, about 6 km from village Kanha) too were senior generals of this Misl.

=== Rise to Power ===
Adina Beg Khan was the Viceroy of the Punjab from May to September 1758. Known for his strict rule, he sought to stop any disturbances brought on by Sikhs. He did this by sending a military force led by Mir Aziz to hunt them out. As a result, a number of Sikh leaders sought shelter in the mud fort of Ram Rauni in Amritsar, including Nand Singh Sanghania, Jassa Singh Ramgarhia, and Jai Singh Kanhaiya. After that, Mir Aziz's army besieged the fort in an effort to crush the Sikh Misls. Jai Singh Kanhaiya launched many attacks on the besieging army during the siege. He made several charges while mounted on a swift horse, sliding by the attackers before turning back toward the fort. Even though he encountered resistance throughout these movements, he was always able to go back to the fort.

=== Conflicts with the Bhangis ===
At first, Jai Singh Kanaihya and Jassa Singh Ramgarhia remained close, working together on a number of military operations against the Afghans and the Mughals. The two Sardars, however, disputed on how to divide the looted plunder after the sack of Kasur. Jai Singh and Hari Singh Dhillon later became tense with one another, which resulted in a fight close to Eminabad. Neither side won a clear win, and the combat ended inconclusively.

In 1774, the Kanhaiya Misl got involved in a struggle between Ranjit Dev and his oldest son, Brij Raj Dev, over the succession to Jammu. The conflict started when Brij Raj Dev tried to protect Ranjit Dev's inheritance and he preferred his younger son, Dalel Singh, as his successor. Charat Singh Sukerchakia and Jai Singh Kanhaiya decided to support Brij Raj Dev's claim when he sought allies. Sukerchakia and Kanhaiya Misls' combined troops invaded Jammu, establishing a camp east of the river. Ranjit Dev organized his own army, collaborating with Jhanda Singh Bhangi's forces.

The fighting went on for a while until Charat Singh perished when as his own revolver exploded, striking him in the forehead. The allies struggled to hold onto their position against the formidable Bhangi Chief after losing Charat Singh. Jai Singh Kanhaiya, aware of their fragile situation, used a loyal operative to assassinate Jhanda Singh Dhillon to shift power. After the Bhangi leader's death, Kanhiya strengthened the Kanhaiya Misl, allowing the area to settle under Ganda Singh, Jhanda Singh's successor.

After Jhanda Singh's death, the rivalry between Bhangi and Kanhaiya misls resurfaced, causing issues for Ganda Singh. The dispute over Jhanda Singh's grant of Pathankot to Nand Singh escalated. Nand Singh's widow proposed to Gurbaksh Singh Kanhaiya for Pathankot and her daughter, but Tara Singh, a Kanhaiya Misl relative, seized the land under doubtful circumstances. After marrying the daughter, Tara Singh murdered both and claimed the territory.

The Kanhaiya Misl rejected Ganda Singh's petition for the restitution of Pathankot after this act outraged him. In order to oppose the Kanhaiyas, Ganda Singh Dhillon allied up with Jassa Singh Ramgarhia and other regional leaders, such as Ranjit Dev of Jammu. Along with the Sukerchakias and Ahluwalias, the Kanhaiya Misl organized themselves for the conflict.

Throughout ten days, the two forces engaged in a continuous and violent battle at Dinanagar. When Ganda Singh unexpectedly died from sickness, the Bhangis' circumstances drastically changed. The Bhangi troops became insecure after his death and the subsequent death of his nephew Charat Singh, and they ultimately left the battlefield. Due to unclear leadership and low morale among the Bhangi allies, the Kanhaiya Misl and its alliance held their ground and won the war.

=== Conflicts with the Ramgarhias ===
In September 1778, the Kanhaiya and Ramgarhia Misls clashed over revenue in Upper Bari Doab and Upper Jullundur Doab. Jai Singh Kanhaiya, with the help of Jassa Singh Ahluwalia, fell on Jassa Singh Ramgarhia's stronghold at Sri Hargobindpur. The latter resisted stubbornly, but was forced to withdraw. Batala was under the possession of Jassa Singh Ramgarhia's brother Mali Singh, whom Gurbaksh Singh Kanhaiya besieged, his harsh governance disliked by locals who turned supporters to Kanhaiyas led its city capture and hence was established as the administrator in Gurbaksh Singh. The Kanhaiya and Ahluwalia troops moved on to Kalanaur, which was held by Tara Singh Ramgarhia; after his defeat and death, Haqiqat Singh Kanhaiya took control, strengthening their hold over the former Ramgarhia territories in Trans-Sutlej.

=== Conquest of Kangra ===
In the late 18th-century struggle for the Kangra fort, the Kanhaiya Misl played a crucial role. The region was previously ruled by Rajput lords of the Katoch line. Under Mughal rule, the fort was located 50 meters above the Ban Ganga. During Ahmad Shah Durrani's rule, Ghamand Chand Katoch ruled, while Saif Ali Khan remained in charge.

In 1782, Raja Sansar Chand Katoch sought help from Jai Singh Kanhiya to take over Kangra fort. Jai Singh sent Gurbakhsh Singh and Baghel Singh to assist in the siege. After Saif Ali Khan's death, Jiwan Khan took over as defender. Gurbaksh Singh Kanhaiya recommended financial and jagir benefits to Jiwan Khan for a peaceful surrender, but followed a different strategy. He personally paid Jiwan Khan a substantial fee in a secretive deal to persuade him to let the Kanhaiya soldiers enter the fort. This move shocked and infuriated Raja Sansar Chand as Gurbakhsh Singh was able to seize control of the fort. After it, the Kanhaiya Misl took control of the whole Kangra area, dominating it all the way to Palampur.

=== Conflict with the Sukerchakias ===
Following Maha Singh's Sack of Jammu, a disagreement over booty distribution led to a war between Jai Singh Kanhaiya and Maha Singh Sukarchakia. Kanhaiya criticized Mahan Singh for hoarding wealth, while Maha Singh Sukerchakia rejected his attempts to please him, leading to retribution. When Mahan Singh started preparing for battle, Jai Singh retaliated by attacking a number of Mahan Singh-controlled areas, including as Mandiala and Rasulpur. This sparked a string of clashes that ended with Jai Singh's loss and withdrawal across the Beas River in the Battle of Majitha. Maha Singh, with increased strength, formed alliances with Jassa Singh Ramgarhia and Raja Sansar Chand. The final battle of Achal resulted from allied forces pushing on Jai Singh's fortress, Batala. Jai Singh lost his son, Gurbaksh Singh Kanhaiya, in the struggle. After the defeat, he disarmed and left himself vulnerable to enemy fire. Opponents chose not to strike further, respecting the experienced leader.

=== Later years ===
When Jai Singh died in 1789, his daughter-in-law Sada Kaur succeeded him. The Kanhaiya Misl's widowed leader, Sada Kaur, was instrumental in forming Punjab's political climate. Sada Kaur demonstrated strategic insight by convincing her father-in-law, Jai Singh Kanhaiya, to set up a matrimonial match between Mehtab Kaur, her only daughter, and Ranjit Singh, the young Sukerchakia Misl heir. Formally established in 1796, this alliance coupled the Kanhaiya Misl's success to that of Ranjit Singh, the new leader.

Sobha Singh, one of the triumvirates who ruled over Lahore in the late 18th century prior to the leadership of Maharaja Ranjit Singh, was from the Kanhaiya Misl.

== Territory ==
The misl originated from Kanha near Lahore. The Kanhaiyas held territory in the Upper Bari Doab. The Kanhaiya Misl controlled areas between Amritsar and the Punjab Hills, with Taragarh, Mirthal, Fathepur, and a small territory near Mukerian with Sohian and Hajipur.

== Leaders ==
Prominent leaders of the misl were:

- Jai Singh
- Sada Kaur

== Gallery ==
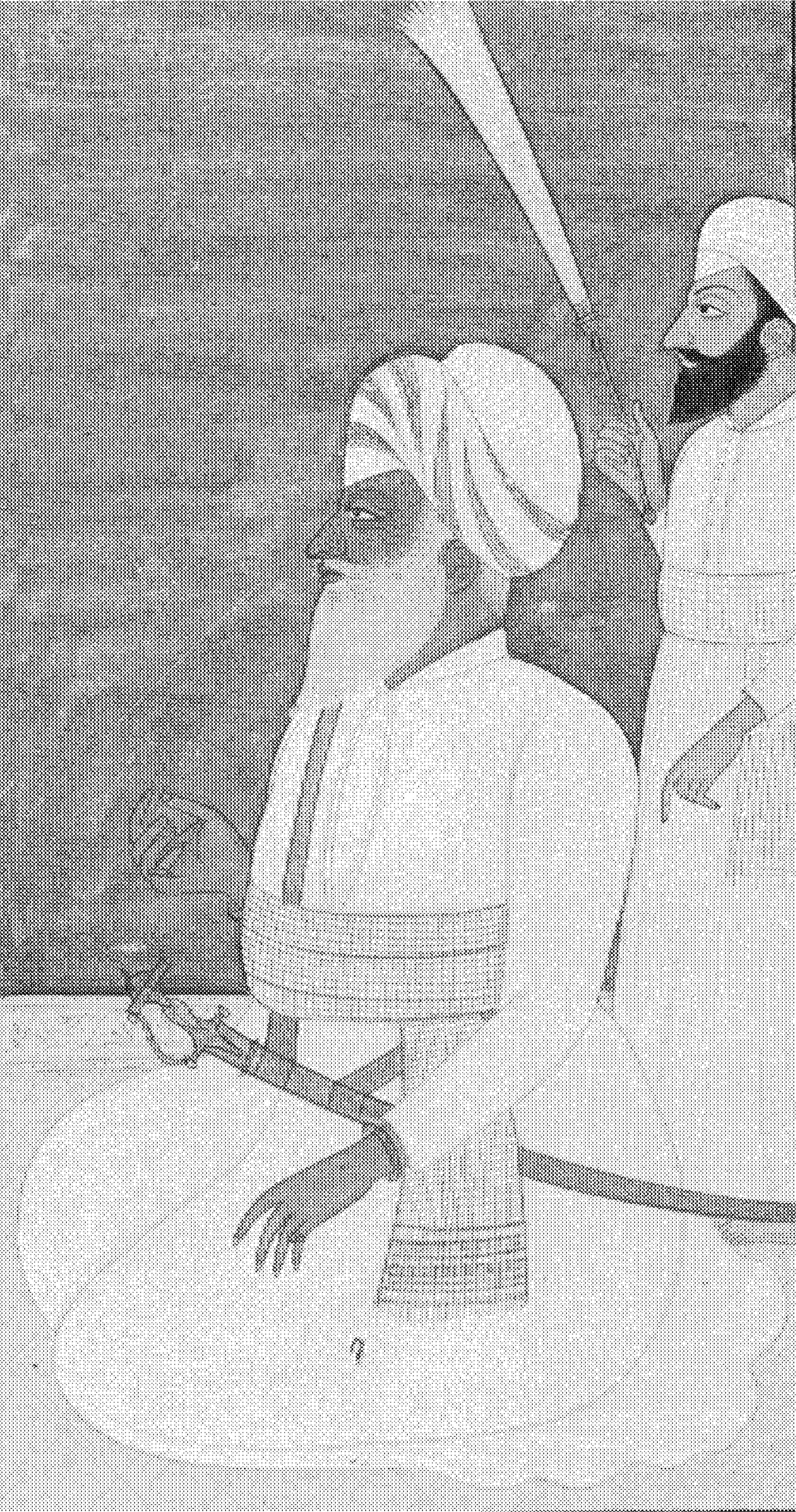
Painting of possibly Amar Singh Kingra with attendant, mid-late eighteenth century

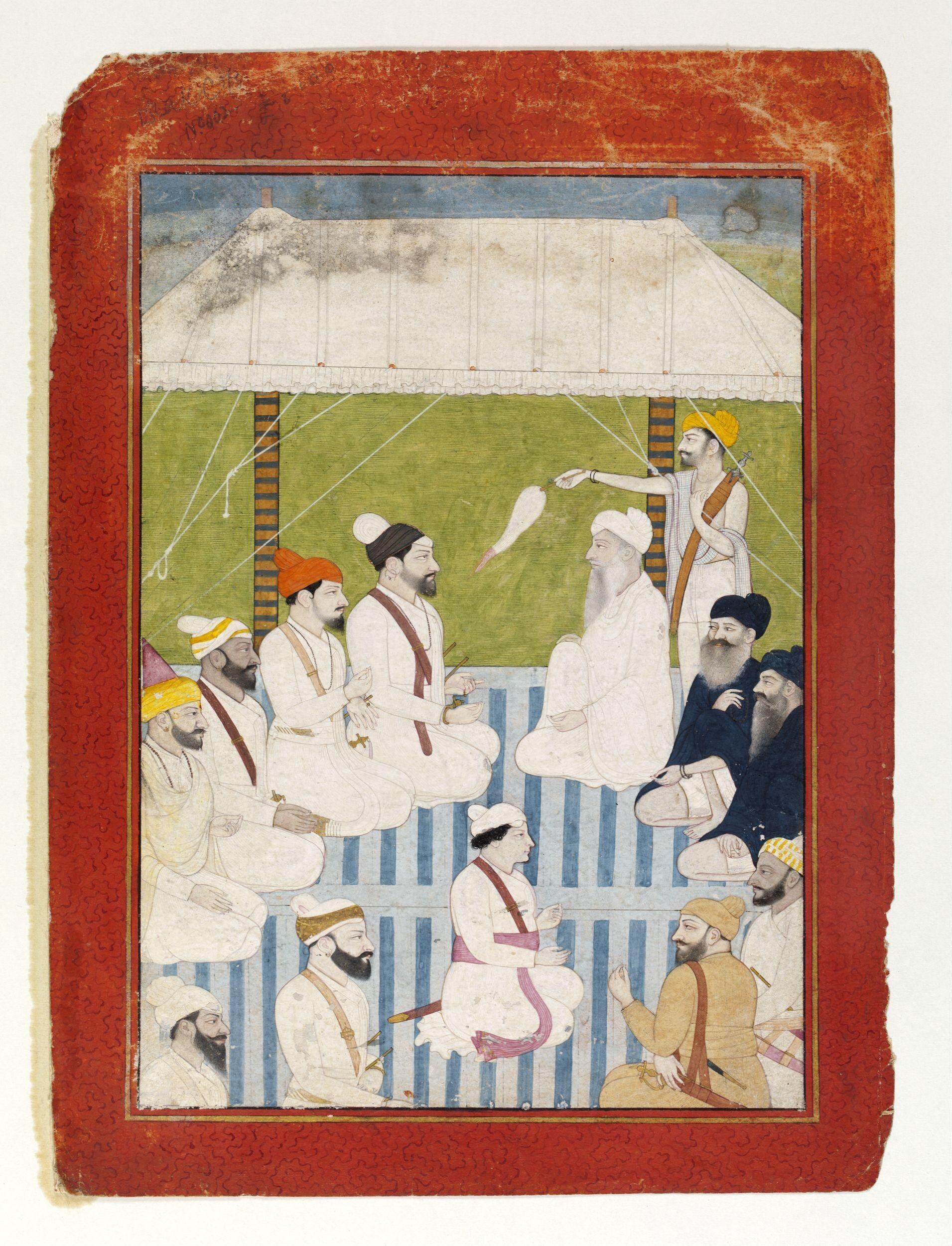
Painting of Jai Singh Kanhaiya receiving Raja Raj Singh and other hill princes with canopy overhead, ca.1774

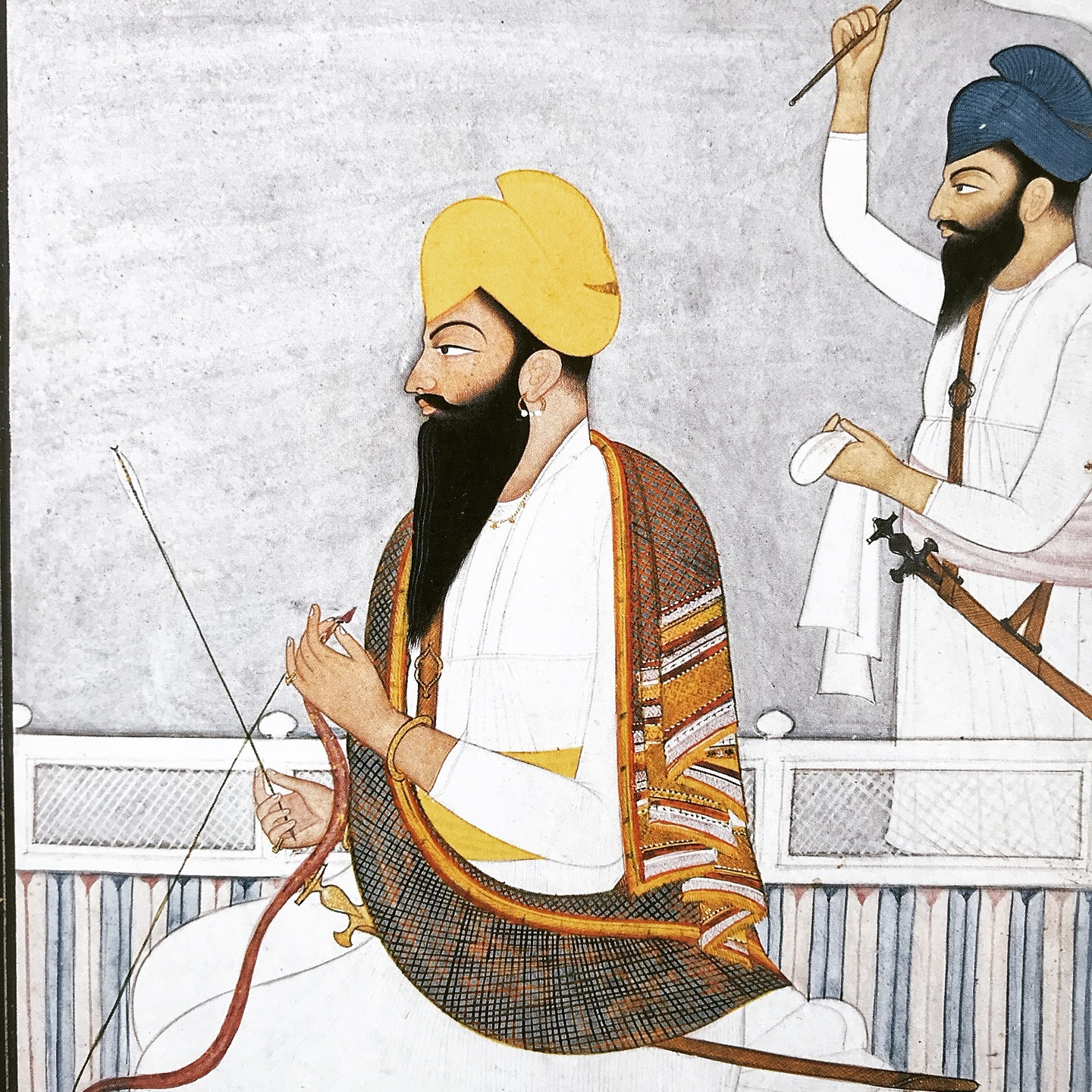
Miniature painting of Gurbaksh Singh Kanhaiya with a fly-whisk attendant. Family atelier of Purkhu of Kangra, ca.1785
