= Sack of Kasur (1763) =

Durrani-Sikh battle in 1763

- Part of Indian campaign of Ahmad Shah Durrani and Afghan–Sikh Wars
Date	May 1763
Location	Kasur, Punjab, Durrani Empire (Modern day Pakistan)
Result	Sikh victory.

Belligerents
Sikh Misls	Durrani Empire

Commanders and leaders
Hari Singh Bhangi; Jassa Singh Ramgarhia; Jai Singh Kanhaiya; Hira Singh Nakkai; Charat Singh; Jhanda Singh Bhangi; Tara Singh Ghaiba	Usman Khan †; Ghulam Muhiy-ud-din †; Kamal-ud-din †; Hasan Khan †; Hamid Khan (POW)

Strength
24,000.	Unknown

Casualties and losses
Unknown	500 Killed

The Sack of Kasur in May 1763 was carried out by Sikh forces led by Hari Singh Bhangi, with support from Jai Singh Kanhaiya and Jassa Singh Ramgarhia, after a Brahmin from Kasur complained that Usman Khan, the governor of Kasur, had seized the beautiful wife of one of them and converted her to Islam.

== Background ==
In April 1763, Sikhs from all over Punjab gathered in Amritsar for the Baisakhi festival. Brahmins from Kasur arrived in the city and reported that the Afghan governor, Usman Khan, had not only mistreated the local Hindu population but had even abducted one of their wives and forced her conversion to Islam.

Hari Singh Bhangi decided to help them, but many Sikhs opposed him. They argued that the Pathans were very powerful, their forts were filled with arms and ammunition, and other Afghan chiefs might come to their aid. However, Hari Singh Bhangi did not change his decision. After some time, Charat Singh supported him and suggested that they seek guidance from the Guru Granth Sahib. The Holy Book was opened at random, and the lines at the top urged everyone to keep their word.

== Sack ==
The Taruna Dal, led by Hari Singh Dhillon and supported by Jassa Singh Ramgarhia, and Jai Singh Kanhaiya, Tara Singh Ghaiba, advanced on Kasur. A handful of Sikh scouts, disguised as merchants and shopkeepers, slipped into the town and reported that its inhabitants were completely unaware of the approaching force. They also discovered that, because of the fierce May heat, the Afghan defenders spent most of their days in underground shelters.

Using this intelligence, the Sikhs entered Kasur at midday and caught the townspeople off guard. They posted sentries at every gate and sealed them, cutting off all routes of escape or reinforcement. In the assault that followed, the town was subjected to widespread looting. Usman Khan and five hundred of his men were killed, and a Brahmin woman who had been held by the Pathans was reunited with her rightful husband. Ghulam Muhiyud-din Khan, the senior Afghan commander, died in combat, while his nephew Hamid Khan surrendered to Jhanda Singh and secured his life by promising a ransom of four lakh rupees. The city was thoroughly plundered and set ablaze, and the Sikhs emerged with such vast quantities of gold, silver, jewelry, and pearls that every Sikh Chiefs returned home richly rewarded. Hari Singh Bhangi later established a police post in the city to monitor the activities of the Pathans.

== Aftermath ==
The Ramgarhia Misl and Kanhaiya Misl worked together and shared all their booty equally. On this occasion, however, Jassa Singh's brother, Mali Singh, kept the entire loot for himself. As a consequence, ill feelings arose between the two chiefs. Jassa Singh Ramgarhia buried this treasure in a forest near Amritsar, but later forgot the exact location and lost it forever.
