= Siege of Sodhra =

1790 siege between Sukerchakia and Bhangi misls

Date	1790
Location	Sodhra, near Wazirabad, Punjab
Result	Bhangi victory

Belligerents
Sukerchakia Misl	Bhangi Misl

Commanders and leaders
Mahan Singh (DOW); Ranjit Singh	Sahib Singh Bhangi; Karam Singh Dulu

Strength
Unknown	Unknown

Casualties and losses
Unknown	Unknown

The Siege of Sodhra was a siege fought between the Sukerchakia Misl under Mahan Singh and the Bhangi Misl under Sahib Singh Bhangi of Gujrat. It took place at Sodhra, near Wazirabad, in 1790. The siege arose from a dispute over Sahib Singh's succession and Mahan Singh's demand for tribute. The Siege is chiefly remembered for the illness and death of Mahan Singh during the campaign and for its the early rise of Ranjit Singh.

== Background ==
The conflict developed out of the rivalry between the Sukarchakias and the Bhangis in the region of Gujrat and Sodhra. Sahib Singh Bhangi was one of the sons of Gujjar Singh Bhangi. After disputes within the family and the death of Gujjar Singh Bhangi, Sahib Singh held Gujrat, while his brother Fateh Singh sought support from Mahan Singh. Mahan Singh then pressed a claim over Sahib Singh's territories and demanded tribute or succession payment.

Sodhra lay east of Wazirabad, between Gujrat and Gujranwala, and was one of the important Bhangi positions in the area. Hari Ram Gupta described it as being in the independent charge of Sahib Singh at the time of the siege.

== Siege ==
Mahan Singh laid siege to Sodhra after Sahib Singh had withdrawn there or was already holding the fort. Sahib Singh's wife Raj Kaur, who was Mahan Singh's sister, attempted to mediate between the two sides, but the fighting continued.

The news of the siege spread among the Sikh chiefs. Karam Singh Dulu of Chiniot came to support Sahib Singh and Jodh Singh of Wazirabad withdrew from Mahan Singh's side during the fighting.

During the fighting Mahan Singh suddenly collapsed on the field or in his howdah and was taken back to Gujranwala, where he died a few days later. This turned the siege into a succession crisis for the Sukarchakias. In one version Mahan Singh formally placed the young Ranjit Singh in charge before retiring from the field.

== Aftermath ==
The siege marked a turning point in the contest between the Sukarchakias and the Bhangis. It coincided with the death of Mahan Singh and the succession of Ranjit Singh, and it formed part of the longer Sukarchakia pressure on Sahib Singh's territories. In the following years Sahib Singh remained an important Bhangi chief, but Sodhra eventually passed into Ranjit Singh's sphere, and Sahib Singh's remaining possessions were later annexed.

== Bibliography ==
- Gupta, Hari Ram (1951). History of the Sikhs: Trans-Sutlej Sikhs, 1769-1799. Punjab: S.N. Sarkar.
- Gupta, Hari Ram (1999). History Of The Sikhs: The Sikh Commonwealth Or Rise And Fall Of Sikh Misls, Vol. Iv (3, illustrated ed.). Munshiram Manoharlal Publishers. ISBN 9788121501651.
- Singh, Dalbir (2010). Rise, Growth And Fall Of Bhangi Misal.
- Siṅgha, Bhagata (1993). A History of the Sikh Misals. Punjab (India): Publication Bureau, Punjabi University.
