= Rauke Kalan =

- village
- Nicknames: Rauke; Raoke
- Location in Punjab Rauke Kalan (India)
- Coordinates: 30.8219132°N 75.1827908°E
- State: Punjab
- Region: Malwa (Punjab)
- District: Moga district

Government
  - Type: Democracy
  - Body: The Government of Punjab

Area
  - Total: 3.5 km^{2} (1.4 sq mi)
- Elevation: 226 m (741 ft)

Population (2011)
  - Total: 7,891

Languages
  - Official: Punjabi
- Time zone: UTC+5:30 (IST)
- PIN: 142037
- Telephone code: 01636
- Vehicle registration: PB-29
- There are approximately 1,540 homes in the village, as of 2011.

Rauke Kalan is a village in the Moga District of Punjab, India.

Rauke Kalan is located 25 kilometres from the district capital, Moga City; 179 kilometres from the state capital, Chandigarh, and 396 kilometres from the nation's capital, New Delhi.

The nearest airports to Rauke Kalan are Sahnewal Airport (LUH), located in Ludhiana District, and Bathinda Airport (BUP), located in Bathinda City. The nearest international airports are Sri Guru Ram Dass Jee International Airport at Amritsar (ATQ) and Chandigarh Airport (IXC).

The highest temperature ever recorded is 48 °C and lowest temperature ever recorded is 0 °C.

== History ==
Rauke Kalan was founded by a Dhaliwal Jat landowner by the name of Choudhary Rau Dhaliwal. One of Rau Dhaliwal's many descendants was Daswandha Dhaliwal and his daughter Sada Kaur who was born in the village of Rauke in 1762.
