= Gurbaksh Singh Kanhaiya =

Eldest son and heir of Jai Singh Kanhaiya (1759-1785)

Gurbaksh Singh
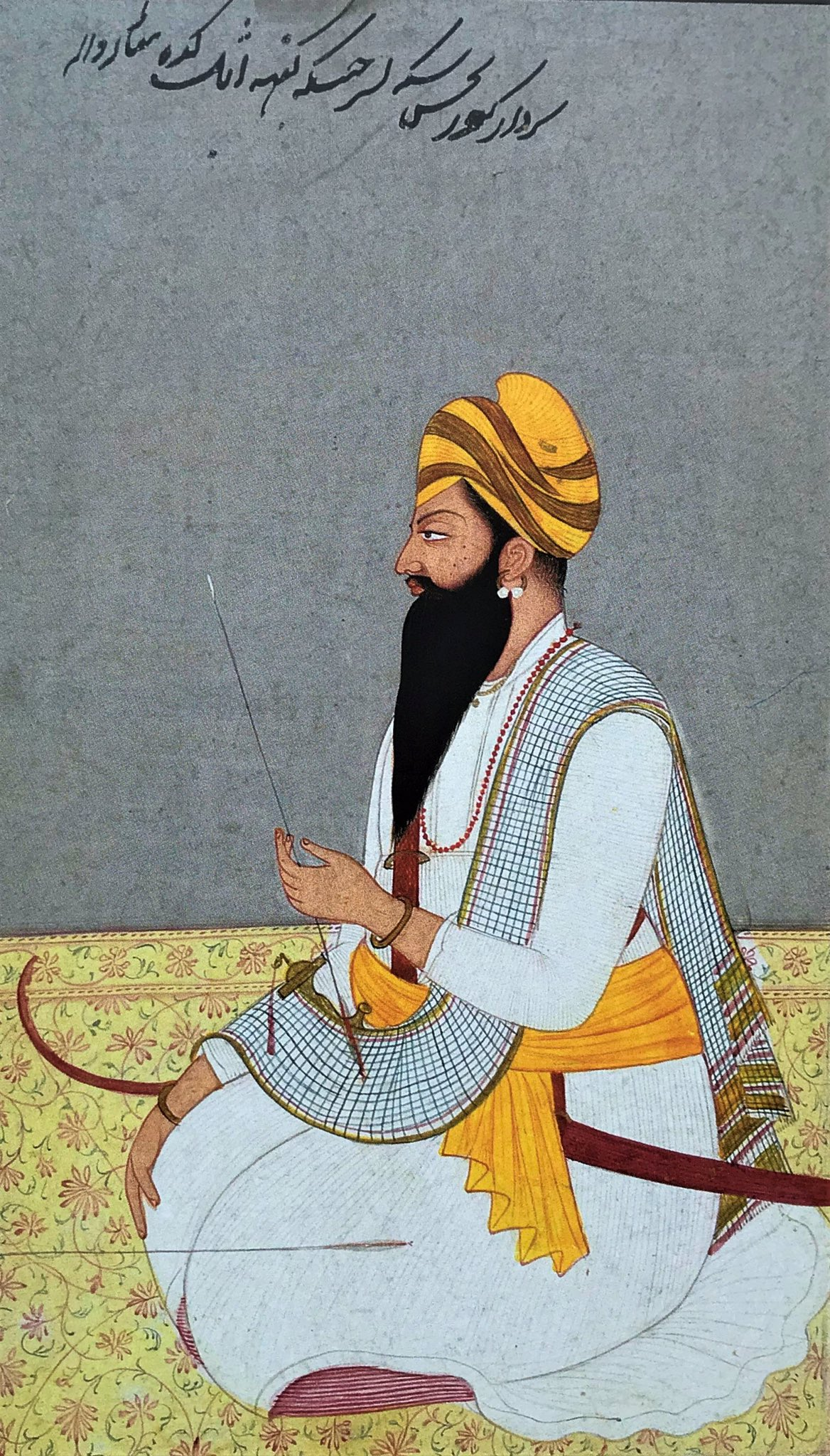
- Indian miniature painting of Gurbaksh Singh Kanhaiya
- Born: c. 1759; Leel village, Amritsar, India
- Died: 1785 (aged 25–26); Batala, India
- Spouse: Sada Kaur
- Issue: Mehtab Kaur
- Father: Jai Singh Kanhaiya
- Mother: Desan Kaur
- Religion: Sikhism

Gurbaksh Singh Kanhaiya (c. 1759–1785) was the eldest son and heir of Jai Singh Kanhaiya, the chief of the Kanhaiya Misl. He was the father of Maharani Mehtab Kaur and thus, the father-in-law of Maharaja Ranjit Singh, the founder of the Sikh Empire.

== Early life ==
Gurbaksh Singh, the heir of Jai Singh Kanhaiya, was born in 1759 to his wife Desan Kaur, who was the widow of Jhanda Singh. His father, Jai Singh, was the founder and leader of the Kanhaiya Misl. Gurbaksh Singh was married at the age of seven to Sada Kaur, a daughter of Sardar Daswandha Singh Alkol. The couple had one child together, a daughter named Mehtab Kaur, who was born in 1782.

She was married in 1796 to Ranjit Singh, the successor of Maha Singh, the leader of the Sukerchakia Misl, who was a rival of the Kanhaiya Misl.

== Military career ==
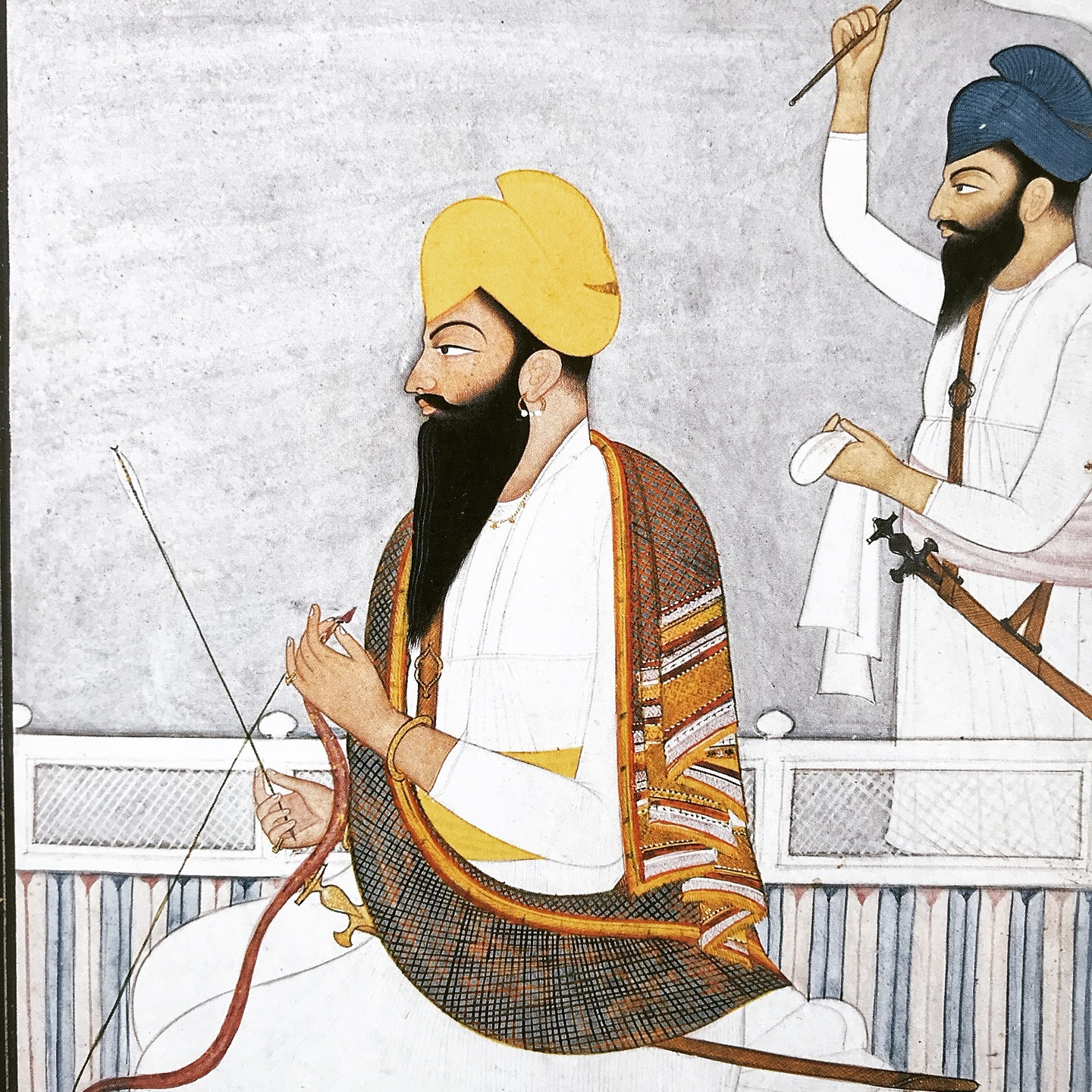
Miniature painting of Gurbaksh Singh Kanhaiya with a fly-whisk attendant. Family atelier of Purkhu of Kangra, ca.1785

In 1778, a quarrel arose between the Ramgarhias and the Kanhaiyas. Jai Singh Kanhaiya and Haqiqat Singh Kanhaiya, supported by Jassa Singh Ahluwalia and Maha Singh, attacked the headquarters of Jassa Singh Ramgarhia at Sri Hargobindpur and captured it. At the same time, Gurbaksh Singh besieged Batala. Mala Singh, the brother of Jassa Singh Ramgarhia, who was infamous among the people, had his officers and the leading citizens of Batala join forces to admit Gurbaksh Singh Kanhaiya into the city, causing Mala Singh to flee. Batala became the headquarters of the Kanhaiya Misl.

In 1783, Sansar Chand invited Jai Singh Kanhaiya to help him capture Kangra Fort. Jai Singh deputized Gurbaksh Singh to Kangra, and he besieged the fort. Saif Ali Khan died during the siege, and his son Jiwan Khan assumed command of the defenses. Gurbaksh Singh suggested to Sansar Chand that he offer a cash incentive and jagir to Jiwan Khan for surrendering the fort to the Raja. When negotiations were completed, Gurbaksh Singh secretly hinted at treachery on the part of the Raja and offered a large sum of money on his own behalf to Jiwan Khan. Upon receiving the heavy bribe, Jiwan Khan admitted Sikh troops into the fort under the Raja’s command. Gurbaksh Singh then established his authority over all the Kangra hills up to Palampur.

== Death ==
The Kanhaiyas, who had replaced the Bhangis as the most powerful misl, disputed Ranjit Singh's father's right to plunder Jammu, and in one of the many skirmishes between the two misls, Gurbaksh Singh was killed in battle against Maha Singh in February 1785.

In the absence of any heir, Gurbaksh Singh's widowed wife, Sada Kaur (an intelligent and ambitious woman) became the chief of the Kanhaiya Misl after her father-in-law's death in 1789. She played an important role in Ranjit Singh's rise to power in Punjab and used to lend support of the Kanhaiya misl to Ranjit Singh till 1821, when she developed differences with him and as a consequence lost her territory to him.

== In popular culture ==
- Rumi Khan portrays Gurbaksh Singh in Life OK's historical drama Sher-e-Punjab: Maharaja Ranjit Singh.

== See also ==
- Ranjit Singh
- Sada Kaur
