= Sada Kaur =

- Rani of Sarkar-e-Khalsa; Chief of Kanhaiyas
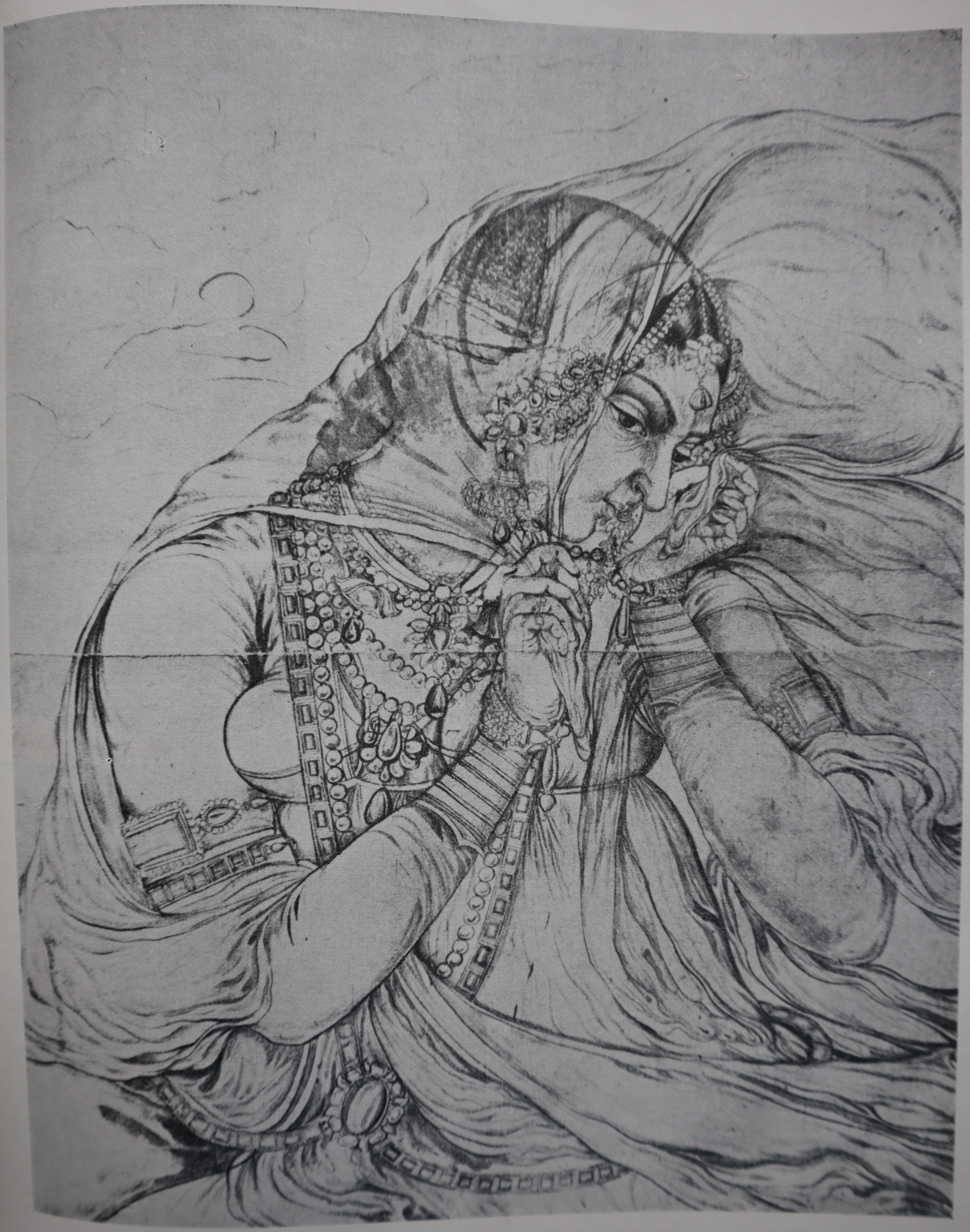
- A sketch of Sada Kaur by Kehar Singh, court artist of Maharaja Ranjit Singh.
- Born: c. 1762; Rauke Kalan, Dallewalia Misl, Sikh Confederacy (present-day Punjab, India)
- Died: 1832 (aged 69–70); Lahore, Punjab, Sikh Empire (present-day Punjab, Pakistan)
- Spouse: Gurbaksh Singh Kanhaiya (m.1768- 1785 his death)
- Issue: Mehtab Kaur
- Dynasty: Dhaliwal Jat (by birth); Kanhaiya Misl (by marriage)
- Father: Daswandha Singh Dhaliwal
- Religion: Sikhism

Rani Sada Kaur (Punjabi: ਸਦਾ ਕੌਰ; c. 1762 – 1832) was a Sikh leader. She served as the chief of the Kanhaiya Misl from 1789 to 1821, following the death of her husband Gurbaksh Singh Kanhaiya, the heir to Jai Singh Kanhaiya, the leader of the Kanhaiya Misl. She is sometimes referred to as Sardarni Sada Kaur.

Described as intelligent and ambitious, Rani Sada Kaur was instrumental in guiding a young Ranjit Singh to found the Sikh Empire. She played an important role in the rise and consolidation of Sikh power in Punjab. Later, she fell out with Ranjit, who imprisoned her and confiscated her estates.

== Early life and marriage ==
Sada Kaur was born into a Dhaliwal Jat Sikh family in 1762 to Sardar Daswandha Singh Dhaliwal. She was married to the 7-year-old Gurbaksh Singh, the eldest son and heir of Jai Singh, the head of the Sandhu Jat ruler of Kanhaiya Misl. They were married in 1768 and had one child together, a daughter named Mehtab Kaur, who was born in 1782.

== Leadership of the Kanhaiya Misl ==
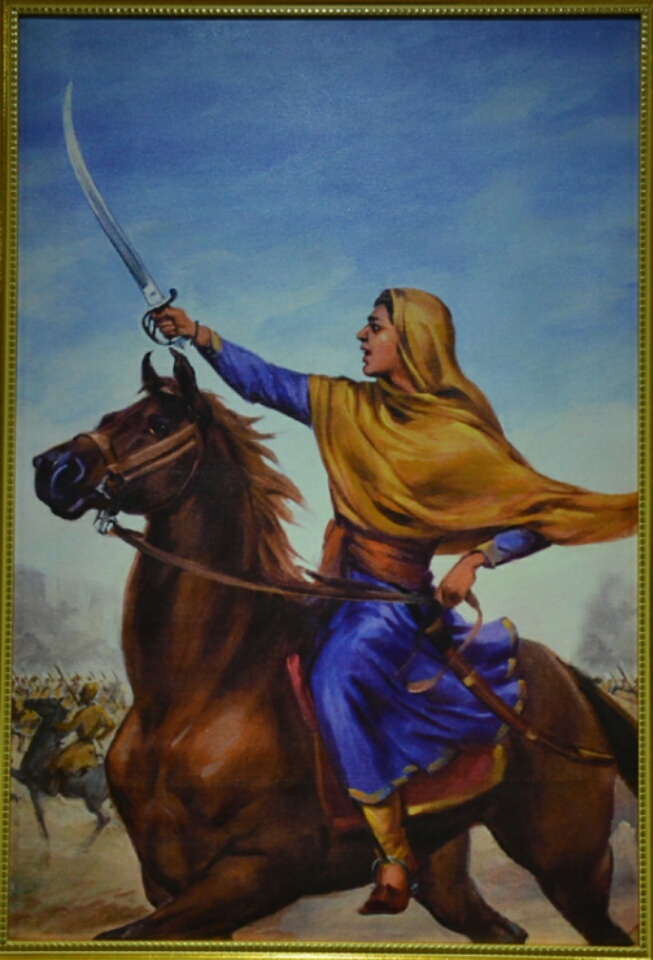
Sada Kaur in battle, 20th century painting.

Gurbaksh Singh died fighting in the Battle of Batala against the Sukerchakia Misl, the Ramgarhia Misl as well as the Sansar Chand Katoch. In 1785, Sada Kaur, along with Jai Singh Kanhaiya, then got her daughter married to Ranjit Singh, the Sukerchakia Misl's chief's son, and they were married in 1786. In 1789, her father-in-law, Jai Singh Kanheya, also died. Sada Kaur then assumed the leadership of the Kanhaiya Misl as well as the loyalty of its 8,000 cavalrymen. After the death of his father, Mahan Singh, in 1792 Ranjit Singh was made the chief of the Sukerchakia Misl and Sada Kaur became his regent. Sada Kaur used both Kanheya and Sukerchakia misals to push Ranjit forward.

The people of Lahore who were tired of the rule of Bhangi misl requested Sada Kaur and Ranjit Singh to take over Lahore. Sada Kaur advised Ranjit that whoever controls Lahore controls Punjab. On 7 July 1799 Ranjit Singh and Sada Kaur attacked Lahore with 25,000 troops. The people of Lahore opened the city gates for them. Ranjit entered the city through Lohari Gate and Sada Kaur entered through Delhi Gate. Sada Kaur made Ranjit Singh the King of Lahore in 1801.

In the battles for Amritsar, Chiniot, Kasur, Attock and Hazara she was with Ranjit Singh. In 1798 Ranjit Singh remarried. Sada Kaur did not approve of it, but choose to move beyond it as she had set her heart on greater and better things and was resolved to see that for her own particular purpose and the purpose of her exclusive tyke (and her offspring in the event that she had any), Ranjit Singh do the arrangements that she had set for him.

She eventually broke with Ranjit. Then Sada Kaur thought of ruling her own state but Ranjit Singh restricted her movements. She retained the majority of her estates until 1820. In 1821, Ranjit Singh imprisoned Sada Kaur and confiscated her possessions. Sada Kaur died in Lahore in 1832.

== In popular culture ==
- Rani Sada Kaur is depicted by Ranveer Singh in his short novel Warrior Queen Rani Sada Kaur (2021), published by Khalis House Publishing.
- Sada Kaur is portrayed by Neeta Mohindra in the DD National series Maharaja Ranjit Singh
- Sada Kaur is portrayed by Sonia Singh in Sher-e-Punjab: Maharaja Ranjit Singh on Life OK.
