= Maha Singh =

Sardar of Sukerchakia Misl (1756/60-1790/92)

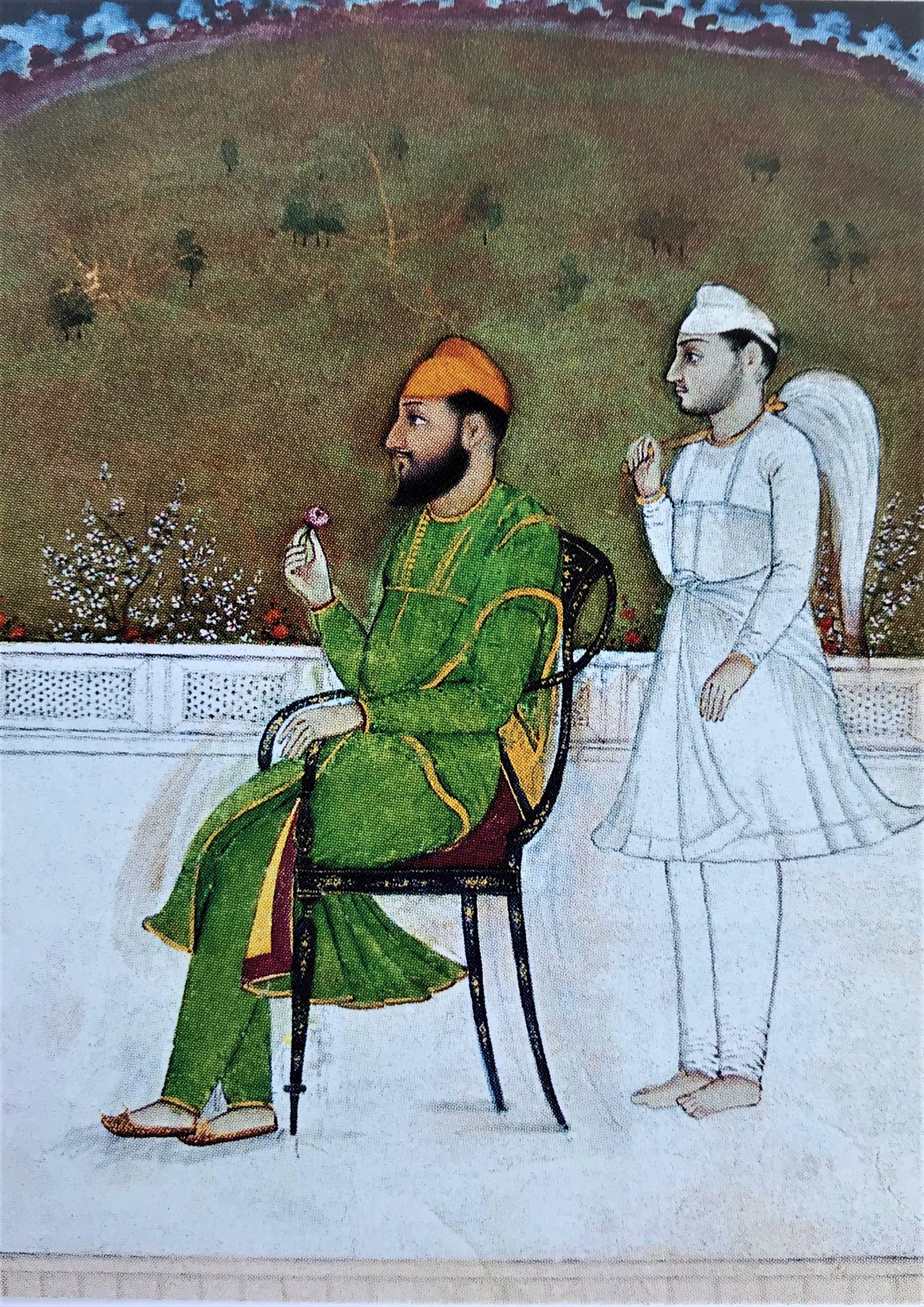
- Sardar Maha Singh of the Sukarchakia Misl

Sardar of Sukerchakia Misl
- Predecessor: Charat Singh
- Successor: Ranjit Singh
- Born: 1756 or 1760; Gujranwala, Sukerchakia Misl, Sikh Confederacy (present-day Punjab, Pakistan)
- Died: 15 April 1790 or April 1792; Gujranwala Fort, Sukerchakia Misl, Sikh Confederacy (present-day Punjab, Pakistan)
- Spouse: Mai Man; Raj Kaur (Mai Malwain)
- Issue: Ranjit Singh
- House: Sukerchakia
- Father: Charat Singh
- Mother: Desan Kaur
- Religion: Sikhism

Maha Singh (Punjabi: Mahaṅ Singh; 1760 – 15 April 1790 or 1756 – April 1792), also spelt as Mahan or Mahn Singh, was the second Sardar of the Sukerchakia Misl, which as a Sikh grouping with its guerilla militia was one of twelve Sikh Misls that later became part of the Sikh Empire. He was the eldest son of Sardar Charat Singh and Sardarni Desan Kaur Warraich. He was the father of the Punjabi king Ranjit Singh.

Upon the death of his father, Charat Singh, he succeeded to the leadership of the Sukerchakia Misl. His son Ranjit Singh succeeded him and established the Sikh Empire. He is known for his alliance with Jassa Singh Ramgarhia and for reducing the power of the Kanhaiya Misl. Maha Singh married firstly Mai Man Kaur, daughter of Sardar Jai Singh Mann of Mughalchak-Mananwala, and secondly Sardarni Raj Kaur, daughter of Raja Gajpat Singh of Jind and mother of Ranjit Singh.

== Early life ==
Maha Singh was born in a Sandhawalia Jat Sikh family to Charat Singh and his wife, Desan Kaur in 1756. Some sources say he was born in the year 1760. He had three younger siblings, Saher Kaur, Raj Kaur and Sahej Singh, who died in infancy. Maha Singh was brought him up in his family's martial tradition by his parents and accompanied his father to a variety of military expeditions from an early age. Charat Singh married Maha Singh to Mai Man Kaur, daughter of Sardar Jai Singh Mann, chief of Mogalchak-Mananwala, before his death in 1770 to strengthen the Sukerchakia Misl. His own matchlock accidentally exploded and killed him.

== Leadership of the Sukerchakia Misl ==
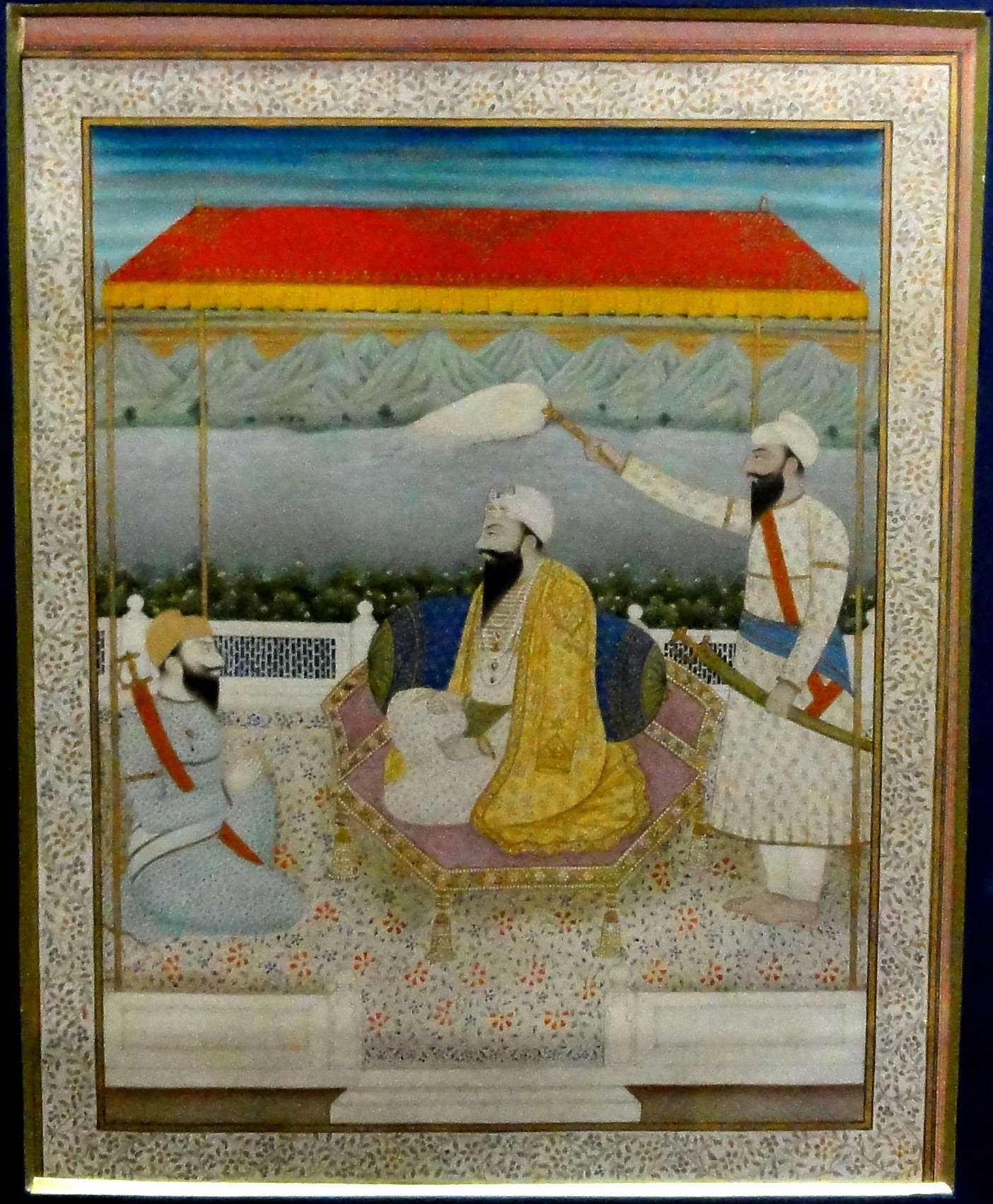
Painting of Mahan Singh seated underneath a red canopy with attendants

He succeeded his father as the chief of the Sukerchakia Misl. Maha Singh was assisted by his mother in the affairs of the state. Desan Kaur was a worldly-wise, experienced, courageous and an intelligent lady, her people were content with her admiration skills. To strengthen her position she married her daughter, Raj Kaur to Sahib Singh, son of Gujjar Singh of the Bhangi Misl and the other daughter, Saher Kaur was married to Sohel Singh. She later arranged for her son Maha Singh to be married to Rajkumari Raj Kaur, daughter of Raja Gajpat Singh of Jind in 1774. By setting up these alliances she ensured the sympathies of the Phulkians and the Bhangis(who were jealous of the growing fame of her late husband); these matrimonial alliances helped her consolidate power. Desan Kaur and Maha Singh were assisted by her brothers Dal Singh of Akalgarh and Gurbaksh Singh as well as Sardar Jai Singh Kanhaiya with whom Charat Singh once exchanged turbans with - a practice done to express solidarity with each other.

Soon Maha Singh captured the Rohtas Fort from Nur-ud-din Bamezai, a general of Ahmad Shah Durrani and occupied Kotli Ahangaran, near Sialkot. After this victory, he laid a four-month siege to Rasool Nagar assisted by Jai Singh Kanhaiya. He triumphed over Pir Muhammad, the ruler of the Chathas, on the eastern bank of river Chenab who surrendered to Maha Singh. This victory added luster to the Sukarchakia Misal, and many other chiefs who were the dependents of the Bhangis offered to transfer their allegiance to the Sukarchakias. While he was at battle, Raj Kaur affectionately known as Mai Malwain gave birth to their only son. The child was named Budh Singh after their ancestor who received amrit sanskar from Guru Gobind Singh himself. On his return from Rasulnagar, Maha Singh was presented with his son and to commemorate his victory the child's name was changed to Ranjit meaning "victor in battle") Singh (meaning "lion").

Mahan Singh distributed grains to every body who approached him, it was said that his good will was the reason behind the recovery of his son from smallpox.

== Military campaign ==
=== Conflict with the Bhangi Misl ===
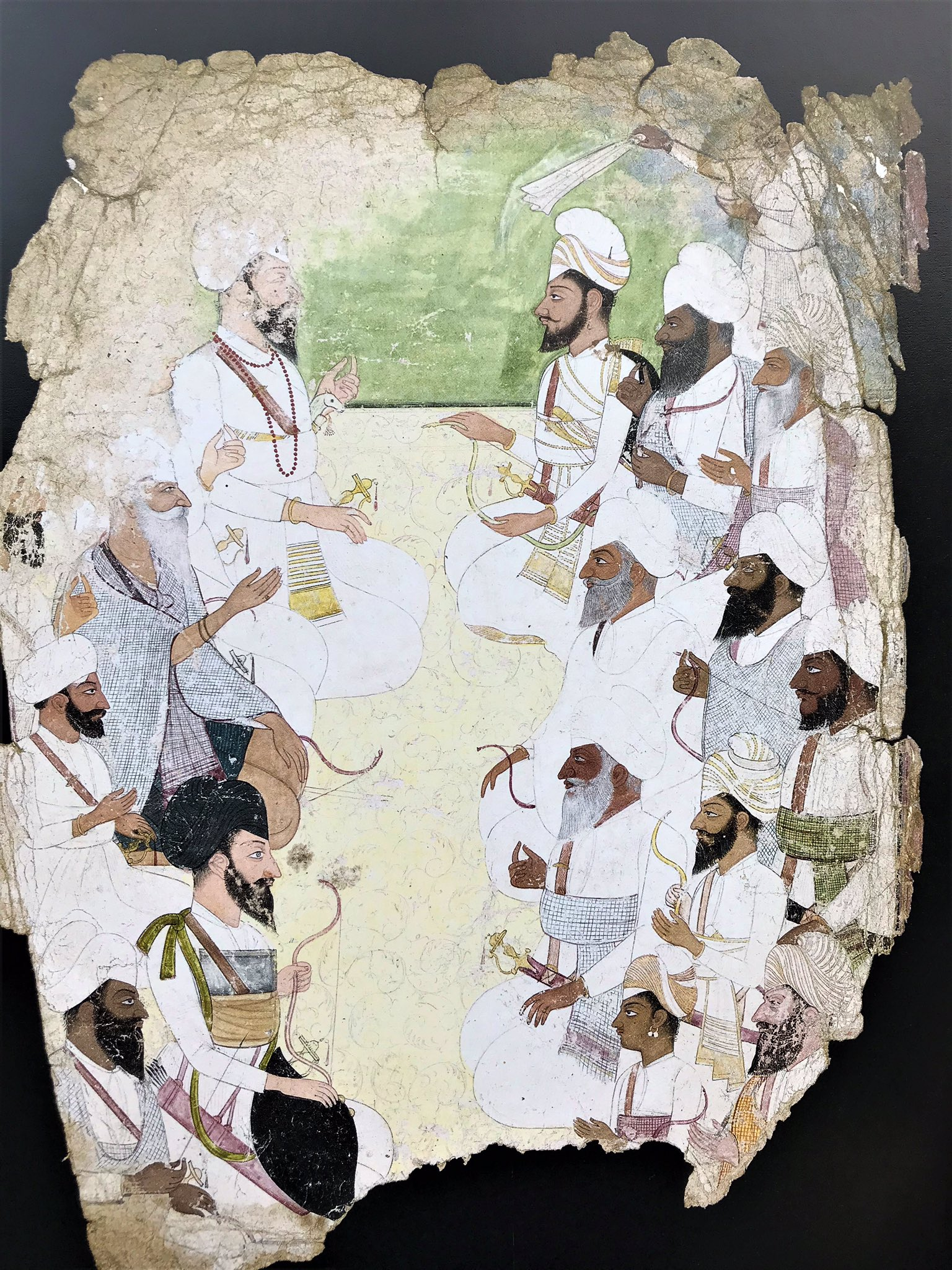
Ramgarhia and Sukarchakia Misls hold a diplomatic meeting. Jassa Singh Ramgarhia (long, white beard) on left. Maha Singh with checked blanket covering chest on the right, in centre

Capture of Bhangi territories Chait Singh, youngest brother of Gujar Singh, had come to help. the Chathas. Mahan Singh arrested him and imprisoned him in the fort of Gujranwala. Raj Kaur, sister of Mahan Singh and wife of Sahib Singh, came from Gujrat to Gujranwala to secure liberation of Chait Singh. Mahan Singh did not listen to her, and did not set the Bhangi sardar free. The Mahan Singh then turned towards Bhangi territories. He captured Sahiwal and imprisoned its qiladar. He seized Pindi Bhattian, Isa Khel and Musa Khel. He killed Desa Singh of Chiniot in 1782. Karam Singh Dulu held his own successfully at Jhang.

In 1777, Mahan Singh entered the Sialkot district, almost the whole of which belonged to Bhangis. First of all he attacked Kotli famous for the manufacture of arms. He obtained match locks in tribute. He stayed in the district for two months. He invited all the Bhangi chiefs to meet him on a fixed day at a certain place. Twenty-two of them responded to his call. They were imprisoned. They were set free on acknowledgement of his overlordship and payment of tribute. Mahan Singh failed to capture Sialkot as it was bravely defended by Charat Singh Bajwa of Badhala village and Mansa Singh and Rupa Singh. Mahan Singh's two months siege proved fairly satisfactory. Bhangis then had to pay tribute to Gujranwala.

In 1788 Gujjar Singh died and was succeeded by his son, Sahib Singh who was also Maha Singh's brother-in-law. Mahan Singh demanded his tribute but Sahib Singh decided to wage war against Maha Singh. Maha Singh then sieged the Sodhara accompanied by his 10 year old son, Ranjit Singh.

=== Conflict with the Kanhaiya Misl ===
After the death of Ranjit Deo, Kanhaiya and Bhangis occupied some of the territories of Jammu. Ranjit Deo's son, Brij Deo asked Maha Singh for help but due to his pact with the Kanhaiyas he asked him to pay tribute to them. Later in January 1784 Haqiqat Singh Kanhaiya and Mahan Singh had made a pact to attack and share the wealth, but Maha Singh did it alone, he Plundered Jammu for three days and nights killing thousands of men the booty was secured was worth than more than one crore, Haqiqat Singh was so deeply shocked at this treachery that he soon died afterwards, the death of Haqiqat Singh was great Loss to Jai Singh, he demanded the Half of the booty from Maha Singh for Haqiqat Singh Son, Jaimal Singh, which Maha Singh refused On the Diwali day in 1784, all the Sikhs chiefs gathered at Amritsar, Jai Singh Kanhaiya behaved coldly with Maha Singh and refused his attempts to reconcile and called him Dancing boy Maha Singh took this insult to heart and he attacked Kanhaiya camp outside Amritsar, Jai Singh pursued him, A further engagements took place near Majitha, Jai Singh was forced to seek shelter inside the town, which was besieged, he escaped into Jalandhar and prepared his army for battle against Maha Singh. Maha Singh knows, he could not face him alone, so he invited Raja Sansar Chand Katoch and Jassa Singh Ramgarhia both enemies of Jai Singh to join him, Jassa Singh Ramgarhia hurried from Tosham at the head of his whole force, and stopped at Jagraon, where Maha Singh agent's met him to form the plan of action, A Kanhaiya force tried to check Ramgarhias but failed a hard battle was fought in near Achal about 4 km from Batala, the battle continued for six hours Gurbaksh Singh Kanhaiya son of Jai Singh died in battle the Kanhaiya force's having lost their leader got disheartened and were routed, Gurbakhsh Singh death broke the back of his father who made no further resistance, He Burst into tears, emptied his quiver of its arrow and dismounting from his horse expose himself to the enemy fires, Tara Singh and Jaimal Singh took him away from the battle field to a place of safely Sada Kaur who was also present in the battle field escaped to her fort Sohian

After the battle of Achal Jai Singh Kanhaiya retired to Naushera where he reorganized his force for a fresh struggle Jassa Singh Ramgarhia and Sansar Chand Katoch got busy in occupying there former possessions, Maha Singh alone remained in the field, Another battle was fought between Maha Singh and Jai Singh Kanhaiya at Naushera, Both sides sustained heavy losses but Jai Singh Kanhaiya suffered a defeat, he escape to his fort of Nurpur Maha Singh pursued him and laid siege to the fort to the fort, Maha Singh did not like to stay at a distant place, he raised the siege and turned homeward, Maha Singh seized Kanhaiya territories with worth a three lakhs a year,

== Matrimonial alliances ==
In 1784, Sardar Ran Singh Nakai, an ambitious chief from the Nakai Misl who just like Maha Singh was considered the future of the Sikh nation, died. He was succeeded by his son, Bhagwan Singh who was unable to hold territory against another chief, Wazir Singh. Realizing they need a powerful ally to counter Wazir Singh with them, Sardarni Karmo Kaur, widow of Sardar Ran Singh sent a proposal to get her infant daughter, Raj Kaur Nakai betrothed to his four-year-old son, Ranjit Singh and Maha Singh readily agreed. This was the first alliance between Nakais and Sukherchakias. This marriage took place in 1792 and Raj Kaur Nakai was renamed Datar Kaur as many ladies in the Sukerchakia Misl bore the name "Raj Kaur", like Ranjit Singh mother and his aunt. She was affectionately called Mai Nakain by Ranjit Singh. In 1801, she gave birth to Ranjit Singh's first son and heir apparent, Kharak Singh. The couple had two other sons Rattan Singh born in 1805 and Fateh Singh who died in infancy.

After the death of Gurbaksh Singh Kanhaiya his widow, Sada Kaur being a farsighted woman, finding the Sukerchakia Misl in its ascendancy, proposed the marriage of her two-year-old daughter to Ranjit Singh. Jai Singh's pride was humbled but he agreed for the match and in 1786 the young children were engaged. Sada Kaur would later succeed to the leadership of the Kanhaiya Misl. With this matrimonial alliance peace was restored between the two contending Misals. This alliance proved very helpful to Ranjit Singh in his future conquests and consolidation of Punjab under his sway. This marriage took place in 1789 and Mehtab Kaur became his first wife and mother of twins, Sher Singh and Tara Singh in 1807.

== Death and legacy ==
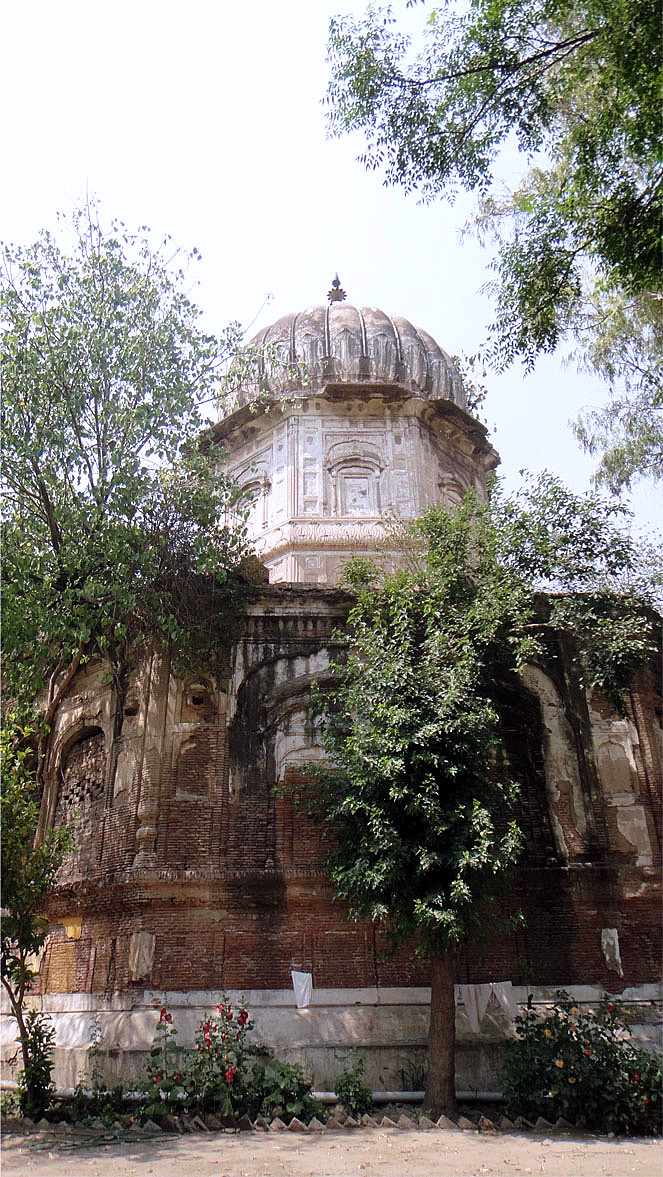
Samadhi of Maha Singh or Mahan Singh, in Sheranwala Garden, Gujranwala.

During the Siege of Sodhra, which was being occupied by the Bhangi Misl, he contracted dysentery The ambitious Sukarchakia chief was having a failing health due to overwork and exhaustion and in the course of the siege of Sodhra when the victory was just insight he was suddenly taken ill by a violent attack of fever. He handed charge to Ranjit Singh and retired to Gujranwala. Ranjit Singh was victorious but Maha Singh died on April 15, 1790. According to Hari Ram Gupta,

"There is not the least doubt about it that if he had lived ten years longer, he would have become the sole monarch of the whole of northern India from the Khyber Pass to the Ganga, and from the Himalayas to the Arabian sea, and Emperor Shah Alam II would have become his protege."

Muhammad Latif states,

"Mahan Singh was brave, enterprising and prudent beyond his years; and the age in which he lived highly favoured his ambitious schemes His early feats in arms had acquired for him so great a reputation that many influential independent Sardars joined his banner. His rapid successes gave him an ascendancy over all the Sikh chiefs. His military genius, undaunted courage, stern temper and rigid observance of the rules of delicacy and honour, at times, involved him in serious trouble, but he honourably acquitted himself on all such occasions."

== In popular culture ==
- In the 2010 historical TV series Maharaja Ranjit Singh telecasted on DD National, the character of Maha Singh is portrayed by Gavie Chahal.
- Maha Singh was portrayed by Shalin Bhanot in Life OK's historical drama Sher-e-Punjab: Maharaja Ranjit Singh

| Preceded by Charat Singh | Leader of the Sukerchakia Misl; 1770 –1792 | Succeeded by Ranjit Singh |
