= Tara Singh Ramgarhia =

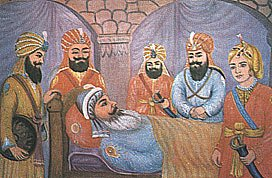
Sardar Jassa Singh Ramgarhia on his death bed surrounded by his brothers Alli Singh, Malli Singh, Tara Singh and his son Jodh Singh Ramgarhia

Tara Singh Ramgarhia was a prominent Sikh leader, a Sardar, brother of the Jassa Singh Ramgarhia (1723–1778).

== Biography ==
In the late eighteenth century the Sikh domains were at their maximum extent, with territories that stretched from the Indus in the West almost as far as Delhi in the East, organized as a loose confederation of misls, or states. The Sikhs had recovered from the period of Afghan influence in the Punjab that culminated in the Wadda Ghalughara (great massacre) in 1764, a mass killing of the Sikhs by Muslims led by Ahmad Shah Abdali. After that the three Ramgarhia brothers Jassa Singh, Mali Singh and Tara Singh were forced for a while to go into hiding, but later regathered their forces and recaptured their territory.

=== Siege of Batala ===
Jassa Singh's brothers precipitated a crisis when they attacked and made Jassa Singh Ahluwalia a prisoner when he was passing through their territory. Other Sikh rulers came to Jassa's aid. Mali Singh was driven out of Dhasua and then Batala in 1778, while Tara Singh got killed in Kalanaur. The Samadhi of Tara Singh is currently located at village Thikdiwal, few Km North of Qadian, Batala, District Gurdaspur.

=== Descendants ===
The son of Jassa Singh, Jodh Singh, inherited his father's title in 1803. On Jodh Singh's death in 1815 a dispute broke out over the succession, with Tara Singh's son Diwan Singh one of the claimants. In order to keep the Ramgarhia's loyal, Maharaja Ranjit Singh divided up Jassa Singh Ramgarhia's estates and wealth among the claimants.
