= Jai Singh Kanhaiya =

Sikh leader (1712-1793)

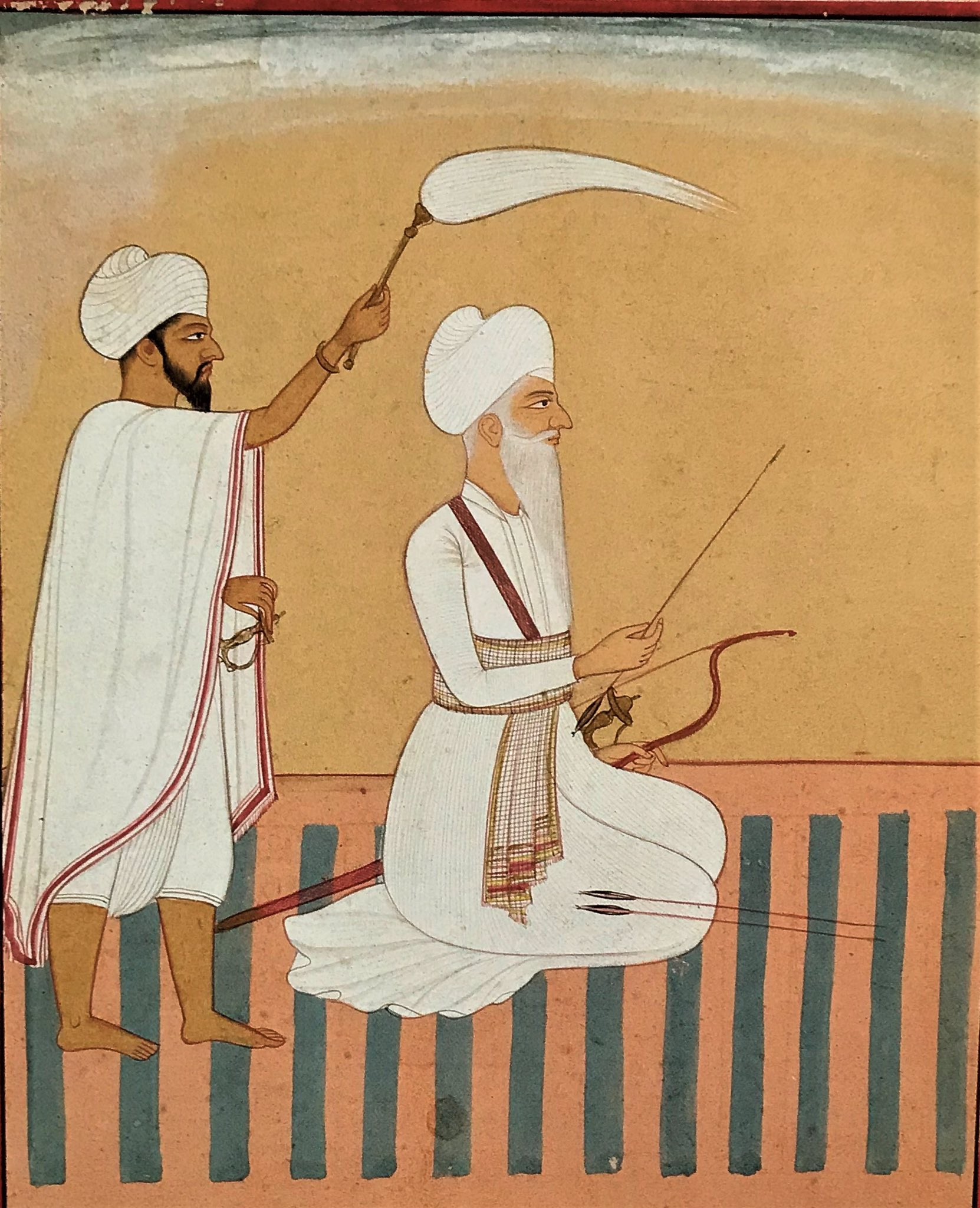
- Painting of Jai Singh Kanhaiya
- Born: 1712; Kahna, Punjab, Mughal Empire (Present day: Kahna, Lahore District, Punjab, Pakistan)
- Died: 1793 (aged 80–81)
- Spouses: Desan Kaur; Raj Kaur
- Children: Gurbaksh Singh Nidhan Singh; Bhag Singh
- Father: Khushal Singh Sandhu

Jai Singh Kanhaiya (1712–1793) was the founder and, until his death, leader of the Kanhaiya Misl in Punjab. His daughter-in-law, Sada Kaur succeeded him as the misl leader.

== Early life ==
Jai Singh was born in a Jat family of the village Kahna, 21 km southwest of Lahore. His father, Khushal Singh, was a farmer who also sold wood and hay in Lahore. His family had humble origins. He was initiated into the Khalsa by Nawab Kapur Singh and joined the jatha of Amar Singh Kingra. In 1759, his wife Desan Kaur (who was the widow of Jhanda Singh) gave birth to his only son and heir Gurbaksh Singh.

== Misldar ==
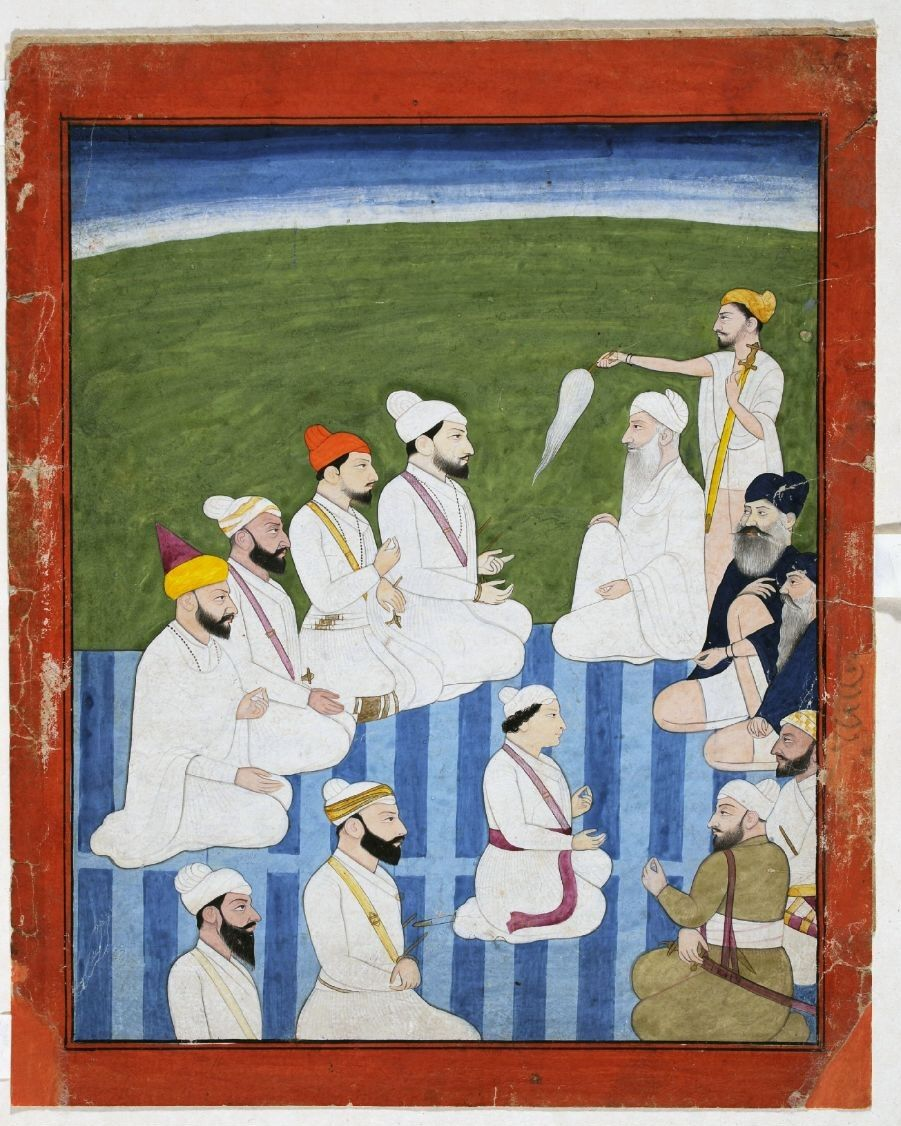
Painting of Jai Singh Kanhaiya receiving Raja Raj Singh and other hill princes, late 18th century

Working in collaboration with Jassa Singh Ramgarhia, he seized a part of Riarki comprising the district of Gurdaspur and upper portions of Amritsar. His headquarters shifted from his wife's village at Sohian, 15 km from Amritsar to Batala to Mukerian. In 1763, Jai Singh Kanhaiya sacked Kasur along with Jassa Singh Ramgarhia and Hari Singh Dhillon. The Ramgarhias and Kanhaiyas shared all their booty equally, but Jassa Singh Ramgarhia tried to keep all the booty for himself. As a result, his relationship with Jassa Singh Ramgarhia deteriorated. He had territories on both sides of the rivers Beas and Ravi. Qazi Nur Muhammad, a historian, wrote in 1765 that Jai Singh Kanhaiya had extended his territory up to Parol, which was 70 km southeast of Jammu and that he was allied with Jassa Singh Ramgarhia because they shared the territory of Batala. The hill chiefs of Nurpur, Datarpur and Siba became his tributaries. In 1774, Jai Singh and Haqiqat Singh built a bazaar in Amritsar called the Katra Kanheyan. In October 1778 he collaborated with Mahan Singh Sukerchakia and Jassa Singh Ahluwalia to defeat Jassa Singh Ramgarhia and exiled him to the desert regions of Hansi and Hissar. In 1781, he led an expedition into Jammu with Haqiqat Singh and received a tribute from Brij Raj Dev, the ruler of Jammu.

=== Jammu, 1774 ===
In 1774, Ranjit Dev and his eldest son, Brij Raj Dev, had a conflict over succession. Due to Brij Raj's poor character, the Raja wanted to choose his younger son as his successor. In response, Brij Raj initiated a rebellion and sought the support of Jai Singh Kanhaiya and Charat Singh. The Raja, in turn, turned to Jhanda Singh and Ganda Singh Dhillon, his tributaries, for help.

The battle lasted 22 days, during which Charat Singh died when his own gun exploded. His wife and son, Mahan Singh, came to the battlefield for the funeral. Jai Singh then declared Mahan Singh the head of the Sukarchakia clan. Unable to face the Bhangis directly, Jai Singh employed a strategic plan. He paid a sweeper, who was an attendant of Jhanda Singh, to kill Jhanda Singh Dhillon. The sweeper shot Jhanda Singh from behind, which led to Ganda Singh’s withdrawal and return to Amritsar.

Ranjit Dev, seeking to stabilize his position, bribed Jai Singh with a large sum of money. Before leaving Jammu, Mahan Singh, although only ten years old, proposed a bond of brotherhood to Brij Raj Dev. The two exchanged turbans in a symbolic ceremony. Jai Singh later moved to Gujranwala, where he took charge of the Sukerchakia affairs and arranged for Mahan Singh’s marriage to the daughter of Raja Gajpat Singh of Jind.

Meanwhile, Ganda Singh Bhangi gained the support of Jai Singh's rival, Jassa Singh Ramgarhia, and they fought several battles against Jai Singh Kanhaiya. In the battle at Dinanagar, Ganda Singh lost his life.

=== Conflict with Maha Singh ===
Haqiqat Singh Kanhaiya made an offer to Maha Singh attack to Jammu Jointly and divide the booty equally Maha Singh agreed the plan was chalked out and the day of matching fixed in January In 1784 Maha Singh reached Jammu by a different route four days before the fixed day, he Plundered Jammu for three days and nights killing thousands of men the booty was secured was worth than one crore when Haqiqat Singh reached Jammu on the fixed day he found the town in flames and in ruins. This treachery shocked him so much that he died of grief on his return to his headquarter Fatehgarh, the death of Haqiqat Singh was great Loss to Jai Singh he damanded the Half of the booty from Maha Singh for Haqiqat Singh Son, Jaimal Singh, which Maha Singh refused

On the Diwali day in 1784, all the Sikhs chiefs gathered at Amritsar, he behaved coldly with Maha Singh and refused his attempts to reconcile and called him Dancing boy Maha Singh took this insult to heart and he attacked Kanhaiya camp outside Amritsar, Jai Singh pursued him, A further engagements took place near Majitha, he was forced to seek shelter inside the town, which was besieged, he escaped into Jalandhar and prepared his army for battle against Maha Singh.

Maha Singh knows, he could not face him alone, so he invited Raja Sansar Chand Katoch and Jassa Singh Ramgarhia both enemies of Jai Singh to join him, Jassa Singh Ramgarhia crossed Satluj River and advanced towards Batala, the battle was fought in near Achal about 4 km from Batala, the battle continued for six hours Gurbaksh Singh Kanhaiya son of Jai Singh died in battle the Kanhaiya force's having lost their leader got disheartened and were routed

Gurbakhsh Singh death broke the back of his father who made no further resistance, He Burst into tears, emptied his quiver of its arrow and dismounting from his horse expose himself to the enemy fires, Tara Singh and Jaimal Singh took him away from the battle field to a place of safely Sada Kaur who was also present in the battle field escaped to her fort Sohian

He suddenly realised his mistake and made up his mind to fight the enemy, he retired from the battlefield and prepared his army, Jassa Singh Ramgarhia and Sansar Chand Katoch got busy in recovering their territories which he had seized, Maha Singh alone remained in the field a battle was fought between him and Maha Singh in Naushahra, Both side faced heavy casualties, he was repulsed, he fled away to Nurpur accompanied by Tara Singh and Jaimal Singh, Maha Singh pursued them, they entered the fort and Started Fighting, Maha Singh soon realised that he had come a long way from his base, he raised the siege and turned homeward, Jassa Singh Ramgarhia recovered his lost territory, Sansar Chand Katoch seized, Hijapur, Mukerian, whole country lying at the foot of the hills, Amar Singh Bagga fully established himself at sujanpur, Maha Singh seized Kanhaiya territories with worth a three lakhs a year,

=== Conflict with Sansar Chand ===
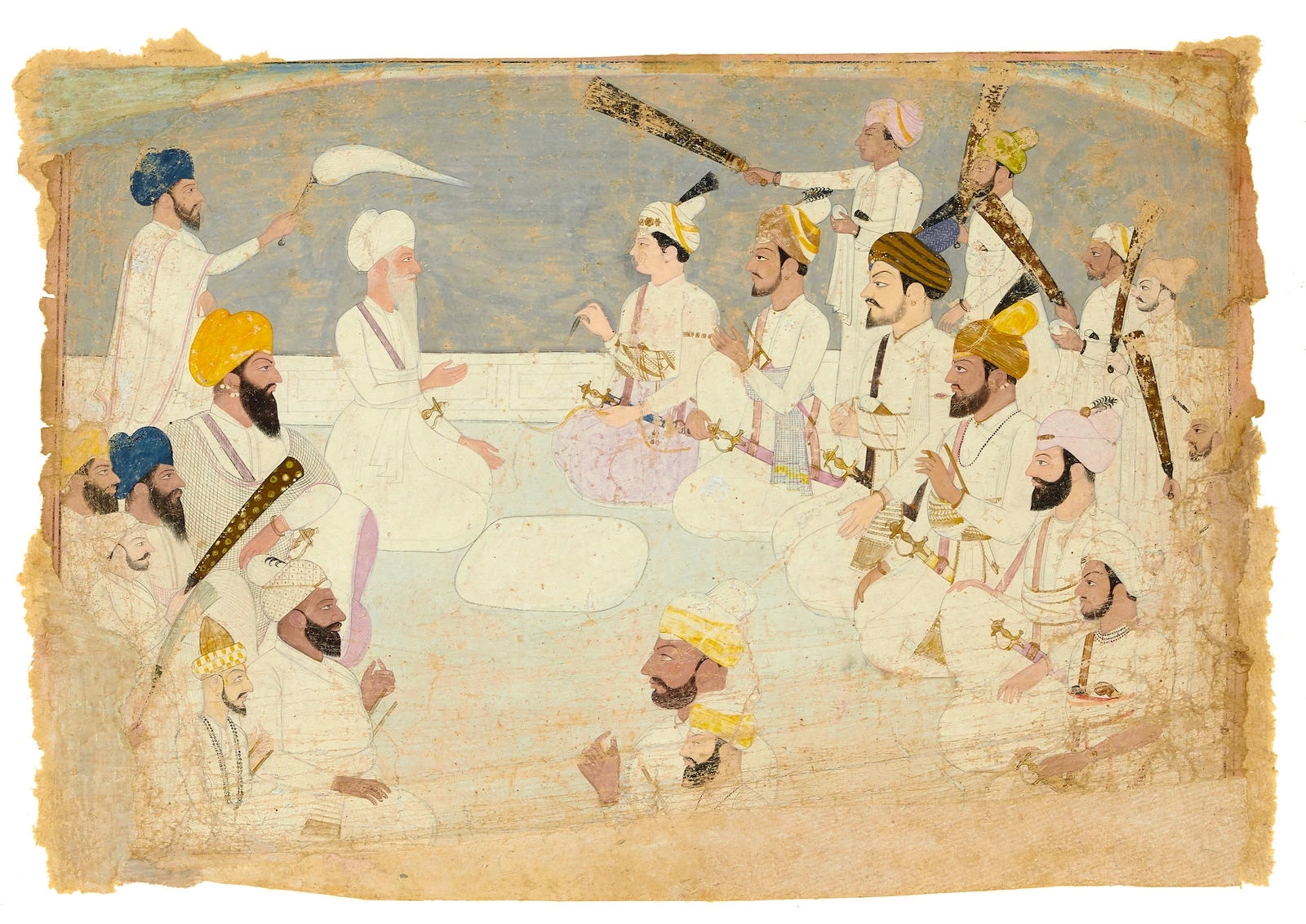
Kangra painting of a darbar (court) scene with Sansar Chand of Kangra and Jai Singh Kanhaiya, circa 18th or 19th century

Sansar Chand requested Maha Singh to help him get back his Kangra Fort in return for a tribute of two lakh rupees. Maha Singh promised to send a force upon his arrival at Gujranwala Meanwhile, Sansar Chand Katoch besieged Jai Singh's fort at Atalgharh, situated on the banks of the river Beas. After four months of unsuccessful attempts, Sansar Chand raised the siege. By this time, Maha Singh had sent a strong contingent of 1,000 troops under his two commanders, Daya Ram and Muhammad Salah. Along with Sansar Chand's men, they besieged the Kangra Fort, and the siege lasted for six months. Maha Singh's men ran short of money, and Sansar Chand declined to pay anything before the fort fell. The two allies began to fight, and Muhammad Salah was killed in the engagement. Daya Ram returned to Gujranwala, and Sansar Chand continued the siege alone. Realizing that he had little chance of taking the fort in an open fight, he resorted to diplomacy. He sent a message to Jai Singh, proposing that they join forces to fight Maha Singh. Jai Singh accepted the proposal. When he came out of the fort, Sansar Chand's men rushed in, and after a short scuffle, Sansar Chand seized the fort. After the marriage of Ranjit Singh and Mehtab Kaur, Maha Singh forced Sansar Chand to surrender all the Kanhaiya territories situated at the foot of the hills to Jai Singh.

== Matrimonial alliance ==
Sada Kaur, of the widow of Gurbaksh Singh Kanhaiya, was an intelligent and shrewd lady, she found it in the interest of the Kanhaiya Misl to bring about reconciliation with the Sukerchakia Misl, she made up her mind to get her only child Mehtab Kaur betrothed to Maha Singh only son Ranjit Singh, she prevailed upon Jai Singh to approve of her proposal, Then she deputed Amar Singh Kingra to Maha Singh to consider the overture, She learnt that Maha Singh's wife Raj Kaur had gone to Jawalamukhi on a pilgrimage to pray for the recovery of Ranjit Singh from smallpox, she immediately went there and persuaded the lady to accept her proposal, In 1786 Mehtab Kaur was married to Ranjit Singh who was only six year old, when the Sukerchakia and kanhaiya Misls were allied through matrimony,

== Death ==
Jai Singh died in 1793 at the age of 81 date given by Kushwaqt Rae, his contemporary, his daughter-in-law Sada Kaur succeeded him.
