= Jassa Singh Ramgarhia =

Sikh leader in the period of Sikh Confederacy

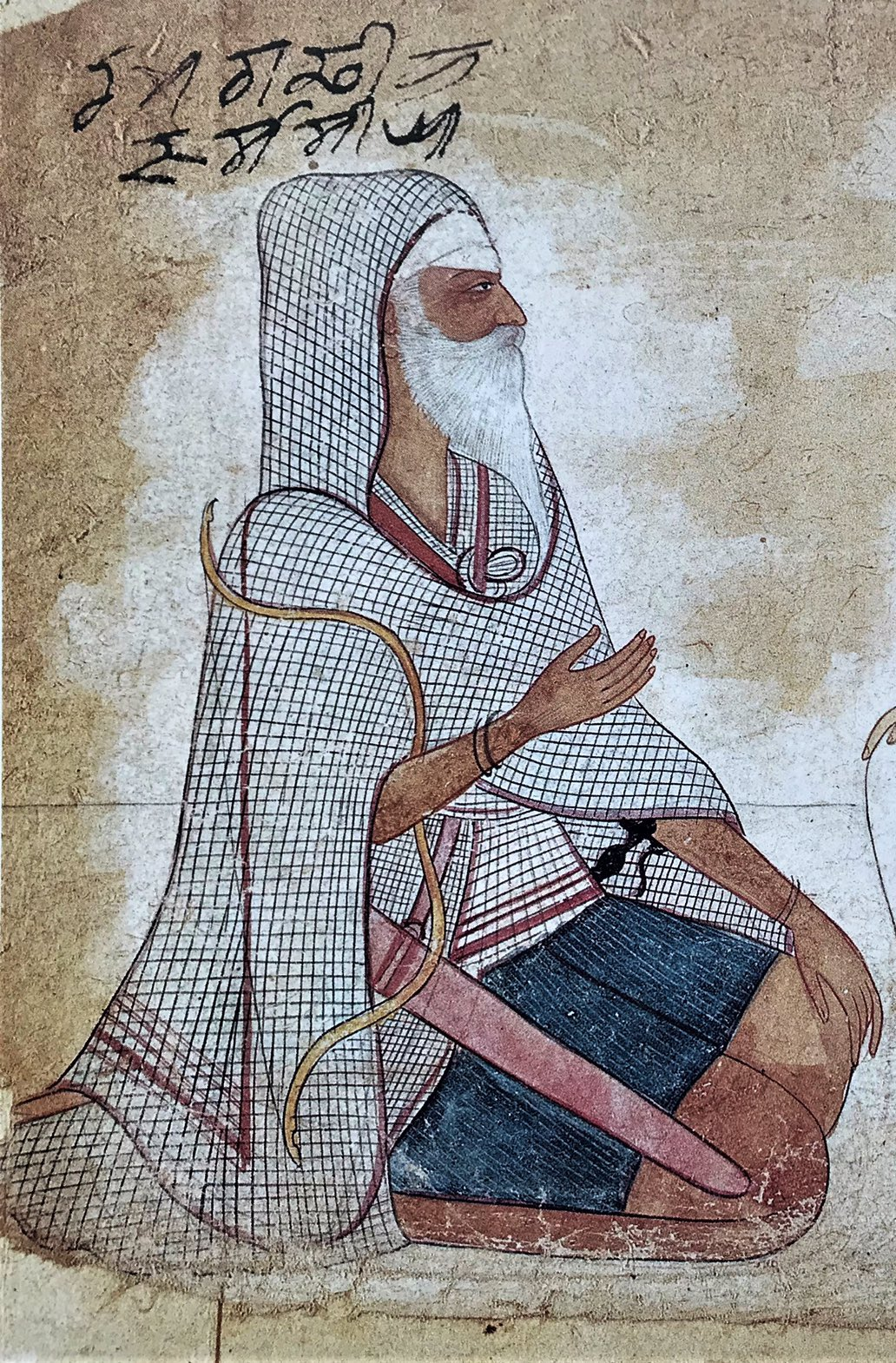
- Jassa Singh Ramgharia, c.1780 painting
- Born: 5 May 1723; Ichogill, Lahore
- Died: 1803 (aged 79–80)
- Known for: Sardar of the Ramgarhia Misl; Sikh raids on Delhi; Siege of Ram Rauni; Battle of Achal
- Successor: Jodh Singh Ramgarhia who ceded his territories to Maharaja Ranjit Singh; Baghel Singh
- Father: Bhagwan Singh
- Relatives: Hardas Singh (grandfather)

Jassa Singh Ramgarhia (1723–1803) was a prominent Sikh leader during the period of the Sikh Confederacy. He was the founder of the Ramgarhia Misl.

== Early life ==
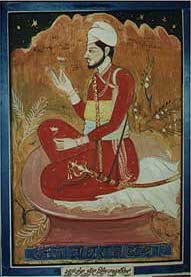
Miniature portrait of Jassa Singh Ramgarhia as a youth.

Jassa Singh Ramgarhia was born into a Sikh family in 1723. According to W. H. McLeod, his birthplace was the village of Ichogil, near Lahore, whilst H. S. Singha refers only to Lahore and Purnima Dhavan mentions origins in either Guga or Sur Singh, both near Amritsar. His father was named Bhagwan Singh, who was the son of Hardas Singh. There is agreement among the sources that he was of Tarkhan origin and was originally named Jassa Singh Thoka (Jassa Singh the Carpenter). He had four brothers - Jai Singh, Khushal Singh, Mali Singh, and Tara Singh - and became head of the family when his father, Giani Bhagwan Singh, died.

Jassa Singh rose to command the Sikh Misl that later became known as the Ramgarhia Misl and built a fort called Ram Rauni in honor of Guru Ram Das in Amritsar. He began his career as working for Adina Beg, who appointed him a risaldar (cavalry commander) and in 1752, rebuilt the damaged fort. The edifice was renamed Ramgarh, from which he took his new name. (Note: The suffix -garh is translated as fort.)

Mir Mannu (Mu'in ul-Mulk), the Governor of Lahore, was worried about the increasing power of the Sikhs so he broke the peace. Mir Mannu also ordered Adina Beg, the Faujdar (garrison commander) of the Jalandhar region, to begin killing the Sikhs. Adina Beg was a very smart politician and wanted the Sikhs to remain involved helping them. In order to develop good relations with the Sikhs, he sent secret messages to them who were living in different places. Jassa Singh Ramgarhia responded and agreed to cooperate with the Faujdar and was made a Risaldar. This position helped him develop good relations with Dewan Kaura Mal at Lahore and assign important posts to the Sikhs in the Jalandhar division.

The Governor of Lahore ordered an attack on Ram Rauni to kill the Sikhs staying in that fort. Adina Beg was required to send his army as well and Jassa Singh, being the commander of the Jalandhar forces, had to join the army to kill the Sikhs in the fort. After about four months of siege, Sikhs ran short of food and supplies in the fort. He contacted the Sikhs inside the fort and joined them. Jassa Singh used the offices of Dewan Kaura Mal and had the siege lifted. The fort was strengthened and named Ramgarh; Jassa Singh Ramgarhia, having been designated the Jathedar of the fort, became popular as Ramgarhia.

Mir Mannu intensified his violence and oppression against the Sikhs. There were only 900 Sikhs when he surrounded the Ramgarh fort again. The Sikhs fought their way out bravely through thousands of army soldiers. The army demolished the fort. The hunt for and torture of the Sikhs continued until Mannu died in 1753. Mannu's death left Punjab without any effective governor. It was again an opportune period for the Sikhs to organise themselves and gain strength. Jassa Singh Ramgarhia rebuilt the fort and took possession of some areas around Amritsar. The Sikhs took upon themselves the task of protecting the people in the villages from the invaders.

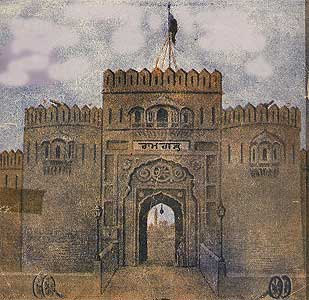
One of the very rare photographs taken of Qila Ram Rauni of Ramgarh.

In 1758, Adina Beg became the Governor of Lahore. Sikhs rebuilt their fort Ramgarh and repaired the Harmandir Sahib. Beg was well acquainted with the strength of the Sikhs and he feared they would oust him if he allowed them to grow stronger, Adina Beg send a strong army under Mir Aziz Bakshi, the Sikhs took up refuge in the Ram Rauni fort, Jassa Singh Ramgarhia, Jai Singh Kanhaiya and other Sikh chief's were in the fort, Jassa Singh and Jai Singh Kanhaiya made several sallies and sorties and killed numbers of besiegers, but they had to evacuate the fort in the end,

== Military career ==
In 1758, After the death of Adina Beg he collaborated with Jai Singh Kanhaiya, and captured Sri Hargobindpur, and Miani and established his headquarters at Sri Hargobindpur.

=== Ahmad Shah's invasions ===
In 1763, he sacked Kasur along with Jai Singh Kanhaiya and Hari Singh Dhillon, the Ramgarhias and kanhaiyas share all their booty equally, on this occasion he tried to keep all the booty for himself, As a result, his relationship with Jai singh Kanhaiya deteriorated.

In 1765, Ahmad Shah Durrani invaded India for seventh time in the winter of 1764–1765, During this campaign he constantly harassed by Sikhs, Qazi Nur Muhammad who was present in the Afghan Army describes the numbers of engagements between Sikhs and Afghans, a battle was fought on the western bank of the Satluj opposite Rupar, it was morning and the Afghan army was hardly gone 3 km from the western bank of the Satluj, when they attacked by the Sikhs, The Afghans immediately stopped marching and got into regular formation of battle, Ahmad Shah Durrani was in the center with 6,000 choice soldiers, Shah Vali Khan, Jahan Khan, Shah Pasand Khan, Anzala Khan and others at the head of 12,000 troops were on the right Nasir Khan with 12,000 Baluchis was on the left, The Dal Khalsa also organised themselves in regular battle army Jassa Singh Ahluwalia fearlessly stood like a mountain in the center close by him was Jassa Singh Thokah, looking like a lion in stature, the Qazi says that Ramgarhia has his own flag and war drum

In 1767, Ahmad Shah Durrani Invaded India for the eight time, while Ahamed Shah was crossing the river Beas, his passage was obstructed by Jassa Singh Ahluwalia and Jassa Singh Ramgarhia, a fierce contest took place in which Ahluwalia was severely wounded. He retired to Cis-Satluj areas, Ramgarhia who had succeeded Hari Singh Dhillon as a leader of Taruna Dal took command of Dal Khalsa

In 1770, he led a plundering expedition into the hills, he defeated Raja Ghamand Chand, the most powerful hill Raja in battle of Talwara on the banks of river Beas, Raja Ghamand Chand and other Rajas of hills become tributary to him, He realised tribute of about two lakhs of rupees from Kangra.

=== Inter-misl warfare ===
A conflict between Jai Singh Kanhaiya and Jassa Singh Ramgarhia developed and the Bhangi Misl sardars also developed differences with Jai Singh Kanhaiya. A big battle was fought between Jai Singh, Charat Singh, and Jassa Singh Ahluwalia on one side and Bhangis, Ramgarhias and their associates on the other side. The Bhangi side lost the battle.

In 1775, Jassa Singh Ahluwalia one day was going to Achal near Batala, he was attacked by Jassa Singh Ramgarhia brothers Khushal singh, Tara singh, and Mali singh, Jassa Singh Ahluwalia was taken prisoner, Jassa Singh Ramgarhia apologized for the misbehaviour of his brothers and honorably returned Ahluwalia with gifts but, the differences between two increased, Jassa Singh Ahluwalia took the oath, He will drive Ramgarhias out of country

=== In Exile ===
The Ramgarhias and the Kanhaiya were in conflict in September 1778 over the revenue of some areas since their domains were mixed together in the Upper Bari Doab and Upper Jullundur Doab districts. In this dispute, Jai Singh Kanhaiya had the backing of Jassa Singh Ahluwalia. With the support of an Ahluwalia force, Jai Singh and Haqiqat Singh Kanhaiya attacked Jassa Singh Ramgarhia's headquarters in Sri Hargobindpur. Jassa Singh Ramgarhia gave a staunch resistance, but the pressure from the attackers compelled him to leave the Trans-Sutlej area. Meanwhile, Batala, which was occupied by Jassa Singh's brother Mali Singh, was under siege by Gurbaksh Singh Kanhaiya. Mali Singh was known for his tyrannical rule, which involved many cruel actions. His rule also did not get much support from the local population. Tired of him, they collaborated with the attackers and opened the way to the city for the besieging Kanhaiyas. After Mali Singh retreated, the Kanhaiyas took control of Batala, and Gurbakhsh Singh was selected as the new administrator. Prominent administrators like Raja Singh, Diwan Singh, Mansabdar Qanungo, and the Brahmin Tara Chand were among those who helped Gurbakhsh Singh. Following these victories, the combined Kanhaiya and Ahluwalia forces advanced towards Kalanaur, which was held by Tara Singh Ramgarhia, another brother of Jassa Singh Ramgarhia. Following Tara Singh's defeat and death, Haqiqat Singh Kanhaiya took control of Kalanaur. Consequently, the whole Ramgarhia area in the Trans-Sutlej region was effectively taken by the Kanhaiyas and the Ahluwalia Misl.

Afterwards Kanwar Bhag Singh Ahluwalia was assigned to Mahtabkot, close to the Satluj River. Jassa Singh Ahluwalia had advised him not to block the Ramgarhia retreat over the river or interfere with their flight. After Jassa Singh was expelled from Punjab, Raja Amar Singh of Patiala was engaged in a battle with the Bhattis in the Sirsa-Bhatner area. To aid in defeating the Bhattis, he offered Jassa Singh a daily allowance of Rs. 500 and provided a safe refuge for Jassa Singh’s son, Jodh Singh Ramgarhia, in Patiala. While at Sirsa, Jassa Singh’s men accidentally lost a couple of brass buckets while drawing water from a well, which was about 100 feet deep. To recover the buckets, they used a metal hook attached to a rope, which got caught on something heavy. When a man was lowered into the well, he found four iron boxes filled with gold coins worth around three or four lakhs. This gold helped Jassa Singh sustain his troops. With the Bhattis defeated, he established his headquarters at Tosham, where he could easily hide in the local hill and raid the Delhi region. He also managed to conquer Hissar area. from this position. While staying at Tosham, a Brahman complained that a Muslim officer from Hisar had abducted his married daughter. In response, a force was immediately sent to deal with the situation. The officer was killed, his property was seized, and the girl was returned to her husband with Rs. 5,000 to guarantee her proper care.

=== In Ganga Doab ===
In March 1783, he come to know that Dal Khalsa under Jassa Singh Ahluwalia was advancing upon Delhi, he joined it at March 10, 1783, On 11 March, Dal Khalsa entered in the royal palaces in the Red Fort, In the Diwan-i-Am Jassa Singh Ahluwalia was placed on the throne of Delhi as Badshah Singh of Delhi by Sikhs, Through Ramgarhia was in minority, yet he challenged the Ahluwalia and called upon him to get down immediately. Both sides drew out swords and were about to pounce upon each other when Jassa Singh Ahluwalia at once renounced the honour, Ramgarhia detached the throne of Mughal emperor Aurangzeb (on which he ordered the death of 9th guru Guru Teg Bahadur) and brought it on elephants and kept it at Golden Temple, Amritsar. Even today it is present at the Golden Temple inside the Ramgarhia Bunga.

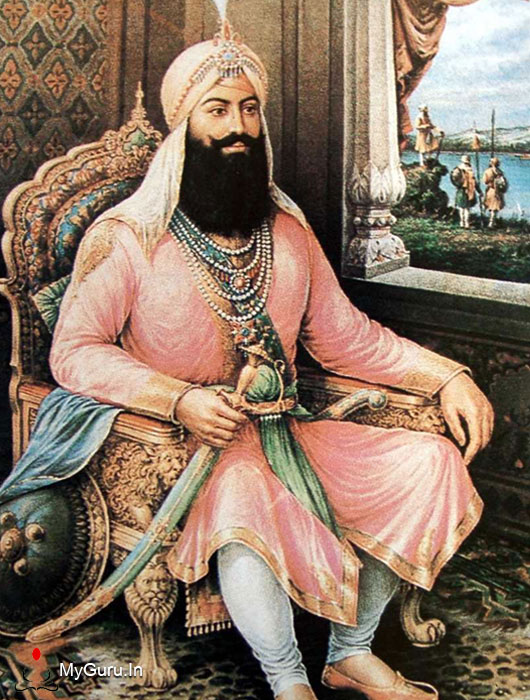
Jassa Singh Ramgharia seated upon his throne, 20th century painting

In January 1784, Jassa Singh Ramgarhia and karam Singh Nirmala crossed the river Yamuna river, They plundered Sarsawa, Zabita Khan dispatched Qutabi Ranghar and Nahar Singh Gujjar with a contingent of troops to stop the Sikhs from entering his territories Zabita vakil visited Sikhs camp Jassa Singh Ramgarhia demanded Rs,50,000, for sparing Zabita Khan territory, Zabita Khan paid Rs,10,000 and agreed to pay this amount as an annual tribute to Jassa Singh, They sacked Naula Village, Merat, Saharanpur, Muzaffarnagar. The Sikhs crossed Jamuna at Barari Ghat and returned home, Jassa Singh come back to Tosham to deposit his booty

In beginning of January 1785, Jassa Singh Ramgarhia along with Baghel Singh, Gurdit Singh of Ladwa passed over Jamuna river, They plundered the village and towns of Sadaat-e-Bara community, Zabita Khan did not stir out of his fort of Ghausgarh, they crossed the Ganga river and entered Rohilakhand, On 13 January, the villages of Barsi and Mahmudpur were laid waste, On 14 January, They sacked Chandausi the great center of about 2000 bankers, rich merchants and jewellers was thoroughly squeezed and booty worth a crore of rupees was obtained in two days and nights,

=== Reconquest of former territory ===
In 1785, Jassa Singh now turned his attention towards the Punjab, Sharp differences had arisen between Jai Singh Kanhaiya and Maha Singh over the booty of Jammu, Maha Singh invited Jassa Singh Ramgarhia and Sansar Chand katoch. Both were enemies of Jai Singh Kanhaiya, Jassa Singh swiftly assembled his forces at Tosham and met with Mahan Singh's agents at Jagraon to devise a plan. Bhag Singh Ahluwalia pledged not to interfere, and despite a failed attempt by Jai Singh's forces to halt the Ramgarhias, the stage was set for battle. The intense battle took place near Acheal, 13 kilometers from Batala, in mid-February 1785. Jai Singh's eldest son, Gurbaksh Singh Kanhaiya, was killed in the engagement. Jassa Singh successfully reclaimed his territories, while Sansar Chand seized Jai Singh's territories at the foot of the hills. Mahan Singh annexed some of the Kanhaiya territory, leaving Jai Singh with only a few strongholds, including Kangra fort and Atalgarh near Mukerian. In the aftermath, Jassa Singh established his headquarters at Batala.

== Death and legacy ==
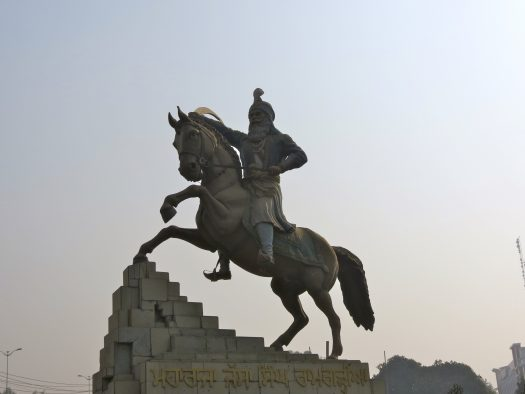
Statue of Sardar Jassa Singh Ramgharia mounted on a horse and holding a sword

Jassa Singh Ramgarhia died in 1803 at the age of 80.

In honour of his achievements and contribution to the Sikh faith, an equestrian statue of Sardar Jassa Singh Ramgharia has been installed in Amritsar, Punjab.

== See also ==
- Baba Deep Singh
- Nawab Kapur Singh
- Ramgarhia Bunga
