= Sohian =

- Village
- Country: India
- State: Punjab
- District: Gurdaspur
- Tehsil: Batala
- Region: Majha

Government
  - Type: Panchayat raj
  - Body: Gram panchayat

Area
  - Total: 114 ha (280 acres)

Population (2011)
  - Total: 604; 312/292 ♂/♀
  - Scheduled Castes: 98; 50/48 ♂/♀
  - Total Households: 131

Languages
  - Official: Punjabi
- Time zone: UTC+5:30 (IST)
- Telephone: 01871
- ISO 3166 code: IN-PB
- Vehicle registration: PB-18
- Website: gurdaspur.nic.in

Sohian is a village in Batala in Gurdaspur district of Punjab State, India. It is located 26 kilometres (16 mi) from sub district headquarter, 54 kilometres (34 mi) from district headquarter and 3 kilometres (1.9 mi) from Sri Hargobindpur. The village is administrated by Sarpanch an elected representative of the village.

== Demography ==
As of 2011, the village has a total number of 131 houses and a population of 604 of which 312 are males while 292 are females. According to the report published by Census India in 2011, out of the total population of the village 98 people are from Schedule Caste and the village does not have any Schedule Tribe population so far.

== See also ==
- List of villages in India
