= Haqiqat Singh Kanhaiya =

Sikh warrior

Haqiqat Singh Kanhaiya (died 1784) was the cousin of Jai Singh Kanhaiya, founder and leader of the Kanhaiya Misl, a grouping of Sikhs with a distinct guerrilla militia. He founded a village named Sangatpur.

== Early life ==
Haqiqat Singh was a Sandhu Jat of village Julka near Kanha Kacha, in Lahore (present-day Pakistan). Haqiqat Singh was initially with Nawab Kapur Singh, whom he was baptized into the Khalsa by, and later joined Jai Singh Kanhaiya.

== Military campaigns ==
In 1778, Jai Singh Kanhaiya and Haqiqat Singh Kanhaiya supported by Jassa Singh Ahluwalia, Maha Singh attacked Jassa Singh Ramgarhia and exiled him to the desert of Hansi and Hisar.

Brij Raj Dev was the Raja of Jammu, he had entered brotherhood with Mahan Singh by exchanging Turbans with his help Brij Raj Dev wanted to recover his parghnas of Karianwala from the bhangis, he also invited help from Haqiqat Singh promising to pay him one lakh of rupees, Just about that time Jai Singh Kanhaiya married a Bhangi girl as his third wife, He tried to dissuade Haqiqat Singh from fighting against Bhangi Misl, he was not prepared to lose a rich reward, he marched towards Jammu, meanwhile Brij Raj had himself recovered Karianwala, He declined to pay stipulated money, Haqiqat Singh seized the parghnas for himself, By that time Mahan Singh also Joined Brij Raj Dev, both of them attacked Haqiqat Singh, but they were defeated, Maha Singh made peace with Haqiqat Singh by paying him a sum of Rupees 50,000, Brij Raj paid him one lakh of rupees already promised and agreed to pay a tribute of Rs,30,000 per year to Haqiqat Singh.

Haqiqat Singh demanded the tribute of Rs 30,000 from Brij Raj Dev after six months, the Raja said it would he paid at the end of year, Haqiqat Singh made up his mind to plunder Jammu, He feared that Mahan Singh might come to help Brij Raj Dev, He suggested to Maha Singh attack to Jammu Jointly and divide the booty equally Maha Singh agreed the plan was chalked out and the day of marching fixed in January In 1784 Maha Singh reached Jammu by a different route four days before the fixed day, he Plundered Jammu for three days and nights killing thousands of men the booty was secured was worth than one crore when Haqiqat Singh reached Jammu on the fixed day he found the town in flames and in ruins

== Death ==
The treachery of Maha Singh shocked him so much. He died in 1784 at his headquarter Fatehgarh. He was succeeded by his son Jaimal Singh Sandhu. His son was married to Rani Sahib Kaur of Patiala State.
