= Sukerchakia Misl =

Sovereign state of the Sikh Confederacy (1748–1801)

Sukerchakia Misl Shukarchakī'ā Misal
- 1748–1801
- Capital: Sukerchak (initial) Gujranwala (later)
- Common language: Punjabi
- Religion: Sikhism (rulers); Islam (majority); Hinduism
- Sardar
  - 1748–1752: Naudh Singh
  - 1752–1774: Charat Singh
  - 1774–1792: Maha Singh
  - 1792–1801: Ranjit Singh
- Historical era: Early modern period
  - Split from Singhpuria Misl: 1748
  - Capture of Lahore by Ranjit Singh and formation of the Sikh Empire: 1801
Preceded by	Succeeded by
Durrani Empire; Singhpuria Misl	Sikh Empire
- Today part of: Pakistan

The Sukerchakia Misl was one of 12 Sikh misls in the Punjab during the 18th century, concentrated in Gujranwala and Hafizabad districts in western Punjab (in modern Pakistan) and ruled from (1752–1801). The misl, or grouping with its own guerilla militia (jatha), was founded by Charat Singh of Sandhawalia, grandfather of Maharaja Ranjit Singh. The last Sukerchakia Misldar (commander of the Misl) was Maharaja Ranjit Singh. Towards the end of the eighteenth century, Maharaja Ranjit Singh united all the misls and established an independent Sikh Empire. The ruling-family of the misl were of a Jat Sikh background.

== Etymology ==
The name Sukerchakia is derived from the words suker (meaning small or narrow) and chak (referring to a petty tract of land). The word originated as a name for land that had been owned and built-upon by Budh Singh, ancestor of Ranjit Singh.

== History ==
=== Family origin ===
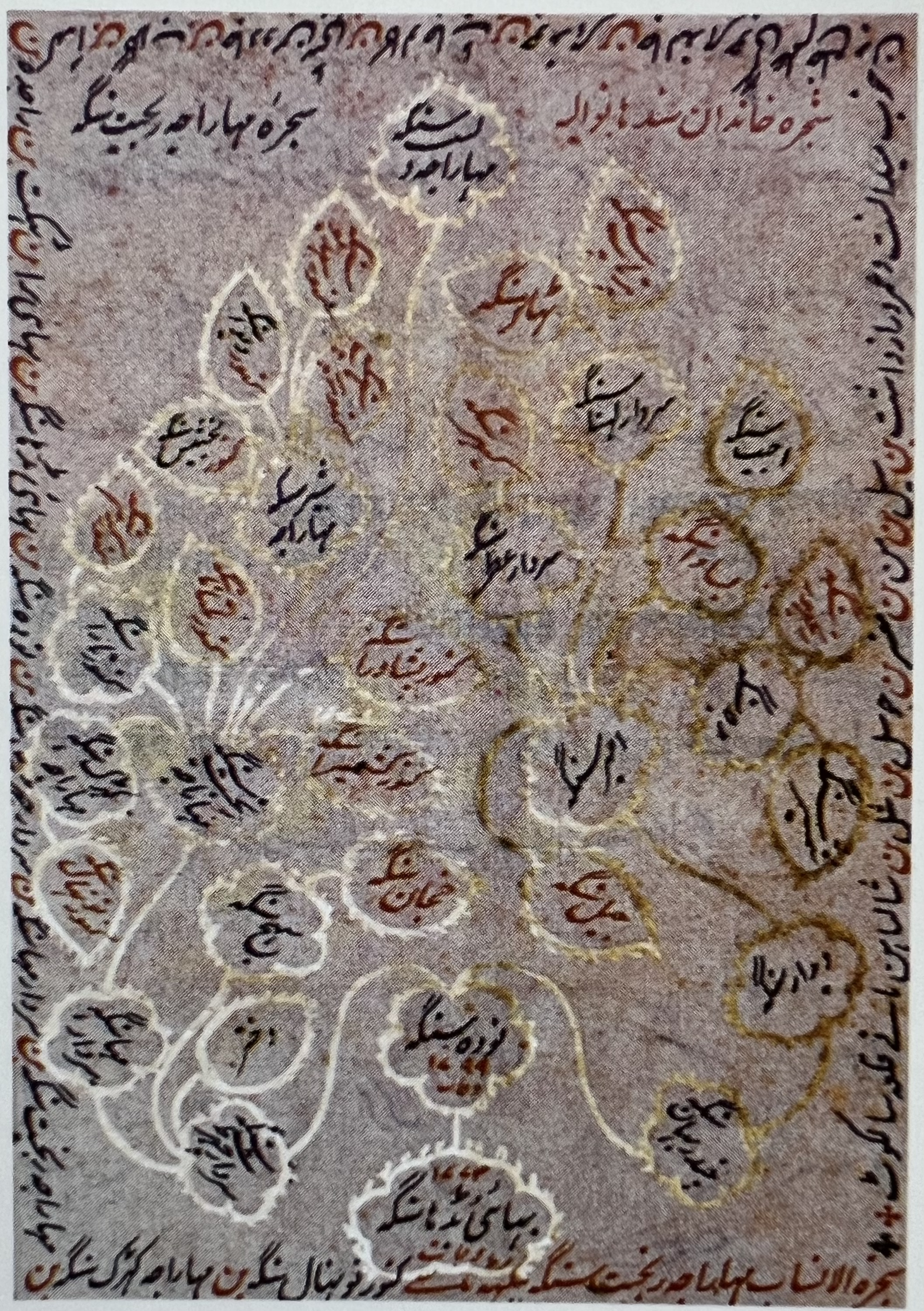
Family-tree of Maharaja Ranjit Singh, from the Iqbalnama-i-Maharaja Ranjit Singh. It claims that Ranjit Singh descended from Raja Salivahan.

The earliest traceable ancestor of the Sukerchakia family with reliable historicity was Kalu (died c.1488), a Jat of the Warraich got (clan), who moved in c.1470 from his native village of Bhatian (in modern-day Lahore district) to Sansara (or Sansi; located in modern-day Ajnala tehsil, Amritsar district, Punjab, India) with his spouse. Later-on, he would further shift his family to Sand, a village approximately six kilometres from Wazirabad. Whilst Kalu had his residence in Sansi, he fathered a son named Jaddoman. Jaddoman became a plunderer associated with the Sansi tribe. He died in c.1515 on a marauding expeditions and was survived by a son named Galeb (also known as Mannu). Galeb also became a plunderer and was renowned for it. He died in c.1549 and was survived by a son named Kiddoh.

=== Sukerchak village ===
Kiddoh shifted his residence from his native village to the village of Sukerchak in c.1555. The etymology of the name of the later Misl originates from the toponym of this village. The village was located approximately 3 kilometres away from Gujranwala. Kiddoh is said to have been spiritually disposed and started working on the land as an agricultural labourer. Kiddoh died in c.1578 and was survived by two sons named Rajadab and Premu. Rajadab would open a grocery store in the village, worked also as an agriculturalist, and was versed and literate in the Landa script. Rajadab died in c.1620 and left behind three sons named Nilu, Telu, and Takht Mal. Only Takht Mal survived past childhood into adulthood, whom benefited from the intergenerational wealth that was passed down to him from the hardwork of his predecessors. With this small fortune, he became a lender and eventually worked his way up to become a banker. When he died in c.1653, he was succeeded by two sons named Balu and Bara.

Baru is the first ancestor of the Sukerchakia family who had associations with Sikhism, as he was a follower of the founder, Guru Nanak, and an avid reader of the Adi Granth (as it was then known). At the age of 25, he expressed a strong desire to become initiated into the religion in Amritsar (Khande-di-Pahul). However, due to an accident, he was unable to complete this mission. On his deathbed in 1679, he told his son, Budda (nicknamed Desu after his horse, Desi; born 1670; later given the baptized name of Budh Singh), to get baptized in Amritsar as a dying wish for his son to fulfil.

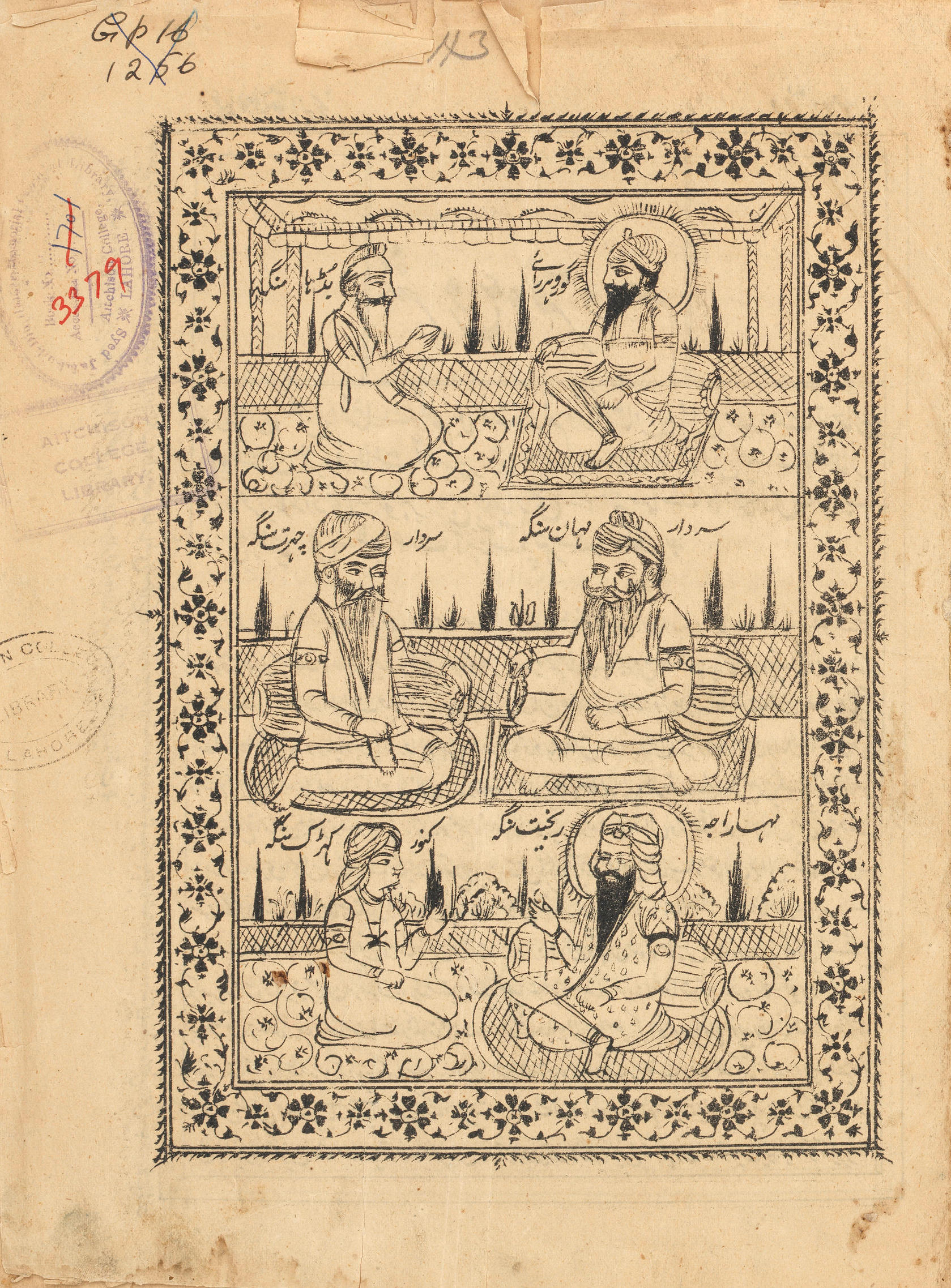
Depiction of maharajas Ranjit Singh and Kharak Singh, with their ancestors Mahan Singh, Charat Singh, and Budh Singh, including Guru Har Rai, lithograph, Umdat al-Tawarikh (vol. II), Albert Press, Lahore, 1886

Once he reached an age of maturity, Budda was baptized into the Khalsa order by Guru Gobind Singh himself and was renamed as Budh Singh. Budh Singh was a warrior of high repute in his time. When Budh Singh died in 1716, his wife committed suicide so they were cremated together. He was survived by two sons, Naudh Singh and Chanda Singh. Chanda was the progenitor of the Sandhawalia family of Raja Sansi.

=== Sukerchakia Jatha ===
Chaudhary Naudh Singh was the landlord of Gujranwala area that he renamed as Shukar Chak (meaning: "thanks for the land"). The very beginning and earliest traces of the Sukerchakia Misl can be traced to Nodha Singh constructing a minor fortress in his native village of Sukerchak, along with gathering a small jatha of 30 horsemen to protect his locality from invading Afghans. He and his group of horsemen would later join the Faizalpuria Misl of Nawab Kapur Singh in 1730. He became wealthy by pillaging the caravans of the invading Afghans and established himself as the local chieftain of Sukerchak. He was severely wounded in 1747 during a fight with Afghans after being shot in the head.

=== Independent misl ===
At the annual Diwali meeting of the Sarbat Khalsa in Amritsar in 1748, a Gurmata was passed that reorganized the various scattered and numerous jathas into eleven organized Misls, with the Sukerchakia Misl forming out of this judgement. (Note: It is unclear if the Sukerchakia Misl would have been established as an independent misl in 1748 after the passing of the Gurmata by the Sarbat Khalsa or if it was established a little later by Charat Singh's split from the Singhpuria Misl.) When Naudh died in 1752, he had four sons who survived him named Charat Singh, Dal Singh, Chet Singh, and Mangi Singh.

==== Under Charat Singh ====
Charat Singh was the eldest son of Naudh Singh, the father of Maha Singh, and the grandfather of Ranjit Singh. Charat Singh formally created the Sukerchakia Misl. He distinguished himself at an early age in campaigns against Ahmad Shah Abdali and split from the Singhpuria Misl to formally establish the Sukerchakia Misl in Gujranwala. He combined with the Mughalchak missal and extended his rule in Rohtas, Chakwal, Pind Dadan Khan which stood in the Pothohar region of northern Punjab and took Wazirabad under his control.

"Chaudhary Charat Singh strengthened his position by matrimonial alliances. Dal Singh Kalianwala of Alipur renamed Akālgarh was married to the sister of Charat Singh. Sohel Singh Bhangi was married to the daughter of Charat Singh. Sahib Singh Bhangi, son of Gujar Singh, was married to another daughter, Raj Kaur. Charat's Singh's son Mahan Singh was married to the daughter of Jai Singh Mann of Mughalchak."

— Hari Ram Gupta, History of the Sikhs. Vol. IV: Sikh Commonwealth or Rise and Fall of the Misls (1982), page 304

During the time of Charat Singh, men were only able to join the misl after having been first baptized into the Khalsa as a criterion for admission. Charat Singh rose the number of horsemen to around 150. The headquarters of the misl moved from Sukerchak village to Gujranwala after the marriage of Charat to Desan Kaur, the daughter of Amir Singh of Gujranwala, whom had been a close ally to Charat. Amir Singh was an aged but still powerful sardar.

==== Under Maha Singh ====
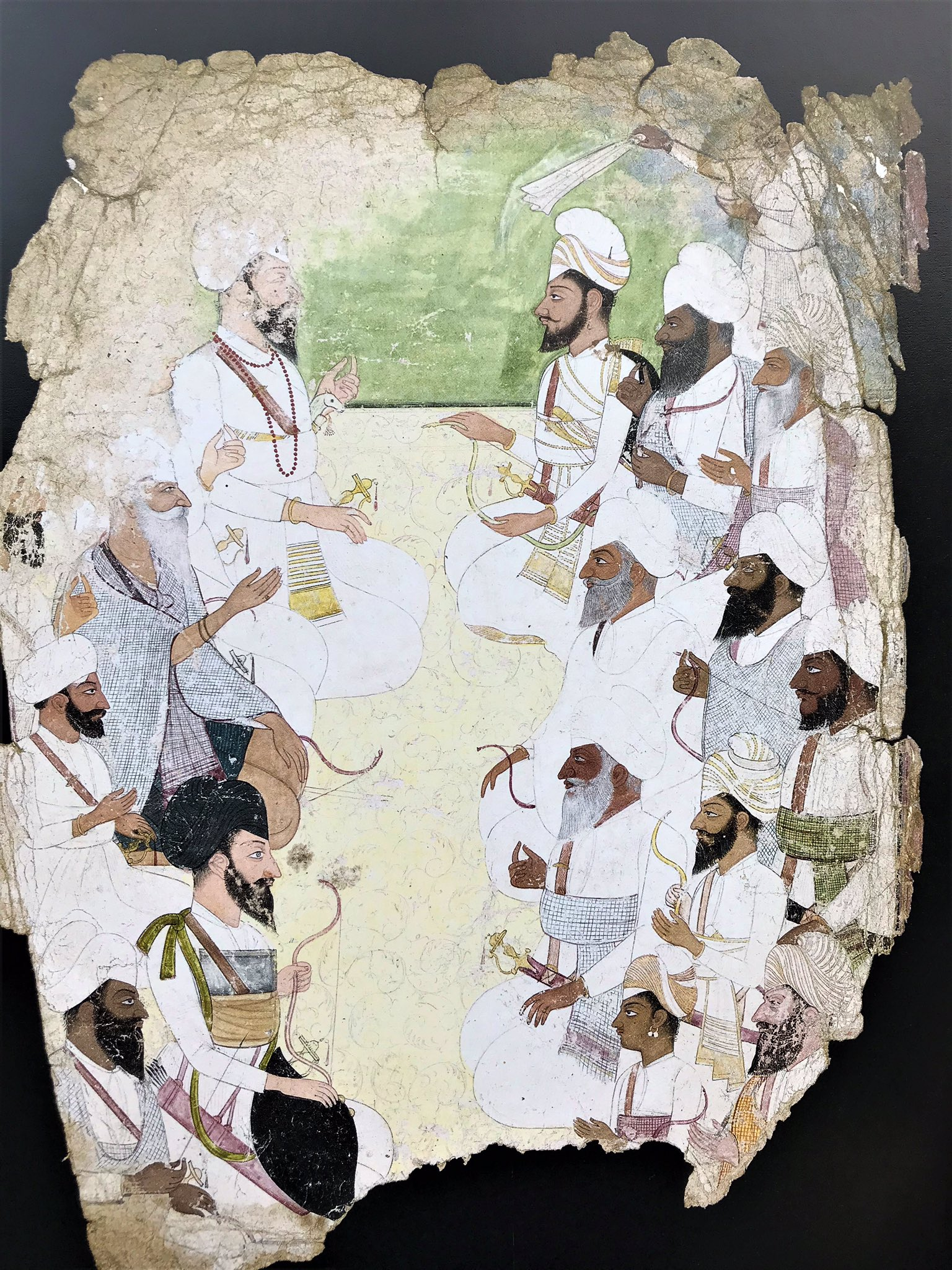
Ramgarhia and Sukarchakia Misls hold a diplomatic meeting. Jassa Singh Ramgarhia (long, white beard) on left. Mahan Singh with checked blanket covering chest on the right, in centre

Then came Maha Singh (d.1792) who also expanded the Misl further.

==== Under Ranjit Singh ====
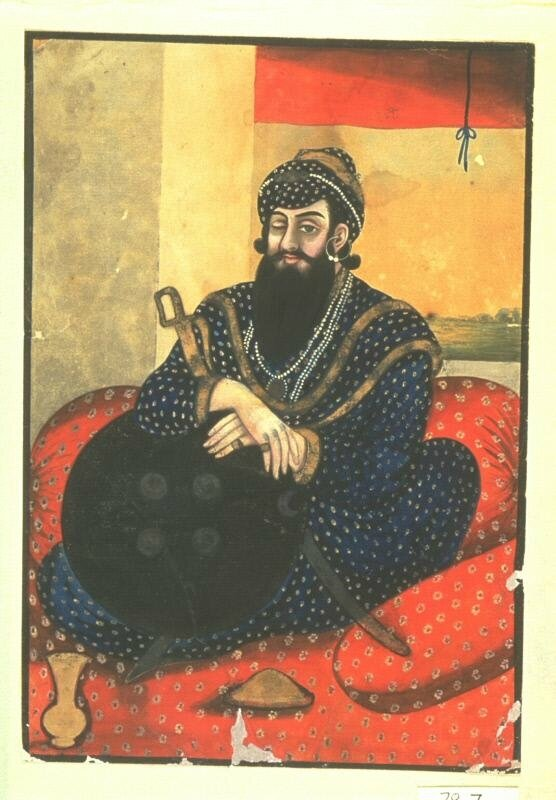
Young Ranjit Singh, company style, circa 19th century

After the decline of the Mughals, Maharaja Ranjit Singh united all the misls and shaped a powerful empire in Punjab.

== Territory ==
The misl originated from Sukerchak near Lahore and originally held territory in the Rechna Doab of Punjab before their major expansion. The Shukerchakias initially held territory south of the Bhangis, dominating the tract of land between the Chenab and Ravi rivers, including the settlements of Gujranwala and Wazirabad.

== Leaders ==
No.	Name (Birth–Death)	Portrait	Term	Reference(s)
As a Jatha under the Singhpuria Misl:
1.	Naudh Singh (died 1752)		1730 – 1748	
As an independent Misl:
–	Naudh Singh (died 1752)		1748 – 1752	
2.	Charat Singh (died 1774)		1752 – 1774	
3.	Maha Singh (died 1792)		1774 – 1792	
4.	Ranjit Singh (1780 – 1839)		1792 – 1801	

== Battles fought by Sukerchakia Misl ==
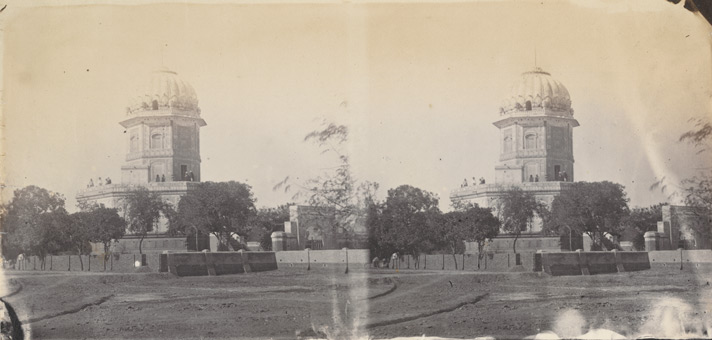
Stereoscopic photograph of the tomb or 'samadhi' (Indic cenotaph) of Mahan Singh at Gujranwala in Punjab, ca.1869

- Battle of Sialkot (1761)
- Battle of Gujranwala (1761)
- Sikh occupation of Lahore
- Battle of Sialkot (1763)
- Siege of Gujranwala (1763)
- Battle of Gujrat (1797)
- Battle of Amritsar (1798)
