= First Sikh invasion of Multan (1764) =

- Part of the Sikh invasion of South-Western Punjab
| Date | 9 March 1764 |
| Location | Multan, Punjab |
| Result | Sikh victory |

Belligerents
| Bhangi Misl | Durrani Empire |

Commanders and leaders
| Hari Singh Bhangi; Jhanda Singh Bhangi; Ganda Singh Bhangi | Ali Muhammad Khan; Muhammad Sharif Khan (POW); Pir Muhammad Khan (POW); Din Muhammad Khan (POW); Azim Yar Khan (POW) |
- Multan was captured and plundered during the campaign, which also included the sack of Kiri Sultan Hayat Khan, a Khudakka Sadozai stronghold near the city.

The First Sikh invasion of Multan (1764) was an invasion in 1764 in which Sikh forces under Hari Singh Bhangi advanced on Multan and plundered the city during a wider south-western expansion after the occupation of Lahore. The campaign also included the assault and plunder of Kiri Sultan Hayat Khan, the stronghold of the Khudakka Sadozais near Multan. Hari Singh Bhangi re-appointed Wali Muhammad Khan as deputy governor of suba Multan, where repairs to the fort and city wall were then being carried out.

== Background ==
In early 1764, Sikh forces occupied Lahore and defeated Ahmad Shah Durrani at the Chenab River. Sikh chiefs then called on officials previously appointed by Ahmad Shah Durrani to remit revenues to them. From Lahore, Sikh forces moved south-westward toward the Derajat and Multan under Hari Singh Bhangi and his sons Jhanda Singh and Ganda Singh, accompanied by Hira Singh Nakai.

When news reached Multan that the Sikhs were approaching, Nawab Ali Muhammad Khan, the subadar of Multan, ordered the inhabitants to enter the walled city with their valuables. The gates of the fort and city were then closed. Most of the population took refuge inside the city, while sections of the Sadozais acted separately.

The advance was accompanied by extensive destruction in the surrounding region. Settlements were looted and burned, Muslim inhabitants were killed, and mosques were demolished during the campaign. Under the command of Jhanda Singh and Ganda Singh, the Sikh forces then arrived before Multan on 9 March 1764.

== Invasion ==
The Sikh advance on Multan formed part of a wider campaign in the region in 1764. Hari Singh Bhangi captured and plundered Multan after moving south-westward, and the campaign continued beyond the city into the Dera Jat territory. Wali Muhammad Khan was subsequently appointed deputy governor of suba Multan, while repairs were undertaken to the fort and city wall.

=== Assault on Kiri Sultan Hayat Khan ===
The Khudakka Sadozais, distrusting Ali Muhammad Khan, did not withdraw into the city. Muhammad Sharif Khan, son of Muhammad Baqir Khan and chief of the Khudakkas, remained in his kiri rather than abandoning it. After reaching the area, Sikh forces under Jhanda Singh Bhangi went directly to Kiri Sultan Hayat Khan, where treasure of the Khudakka family was believed to be stored. Muhammad Sharif Khan, his relatives, and a few hundred retainers resisted but were overcome by the Sikh force. A number of members of the family and their followers were killed, while Muhammad Sharif Khan, his sons Pir Muhammad Khan and Din Muhammad Khan, and Azim Yar Khan were taken prisoner. The women of the family fled into the city. The kiri was looted and then burned. The treasure taken there was described as including gold dust, diamonds, pearls, jewellery, cash, and other valuables. During this attack Ali Muhammad Khan did not assist the Khudakkas.

== Aftermath ==
Qazi Nur Muhammad, an 18th-century Persian chronicler who accompanied Ahmad Shah Durrani during his late 1764 campaign in India, later described Multan as having been left in ruins after the Sikh attack. He wrote:

They led an expedition against Multan and gave the city over to plunder, the dogs (Sikhs) have brought an immense booty from there. My mind refuses (to describe) what the dogs (Sikhs) did there. O faithful ones! Since the days of auspicious-natured Adam none remembers to have heard of such miseries inflicted anywhere except in Multan. But as god willed it each of us also should submit.

Muhammad Sharif Khan remained a prisoner for three years. Other captives were released on ransom, while he was retained longer and was released only after the death of the Sikh chief, when a payment of twelve thousand rupees was made to the widow. He later returned to Multan, repaired the devastated kiri, and went to Kandahar, where he met Ahmad Shah in 1770. Ahmad Shah then granted him jagirs in Dera Ghazi Khan and Multan along with money. The events at Multan, including the treatment of the Sadozais and the conduct of Ali Muhammad Khan, were reported to Ahmad Shah by several parties. In April 1765, Ali Muhammad Khan met Ahmad Shah at Pakpattan and remitted Multan revenues to him. Ahmad Shah confirmed him as governor of Multan but was executed by in 1767.
