= Inayatullah Khan Sial =

Ruler or Sardar of Jhang from 1747 to 1787

- Sardar; Zamindar; Nawab

Sardar of Jhang
- Reign: 1747 – 26 November 1787
- Predecessor: Walidad Khan Sial
- Successor: Sultan Mahmud Sial
- Wazir: Shahadat Khan Sial (1747–1751); Diwan Bhawani Das (1751–1787)
- Born: c. 1715; Jhangi Sialan, Jhang State, Lahore Subah, Mughal Empire (modern-day Punjab, Pakistan)
- Died: 26 November 1787 (aged 71–72); Jhangi Sialan, Jhang State
- Burial: Mai Heer Cemetery
- Spouse: Fateh Bibi
- Issue: Sultan Mahmud Sial; Sahib Khan Sial
- House: Jalalkhanana
- Dynasty: Sial
- Father: Bahram Khan Sial
- Religion: Sunni Islam (Hanafi)

Inayatullah Khan Sial (Punjabi: عنایت اللہ خان سیال) was an 18th-century Punjabi Muslim general and chieftain who served as the 14th Sial sardar of Jhang. He succeeded his uncle Walidad Khan, who died heirless in 1747 and ruled for 40 years until his own death in 1787. He was succeeded by his son Sultan Mahmud.

The Jhang State reached its zenith under Inayatullah Khan, who reportedly fought 22 battles against the Bhangi Misl and the Nawabs of Multan. He also retook Chiniot from the Bhangis, which was lost to them early in his reign but lost it to the Bhangi misl by the end of his reign.

== Reign ==
Inayatullah succeeded Walidad Khan Sial in 1747 and ruled Jhang during a period of warfare between the local chiefs of central Punjab, the rulers of Multan and the expanding Sikh misls.

=== Bhangi conquest of Jhang ===
The expansion of the Bhangi Misl brought the Sikhs into direct conflict with the Sials. By 1760, Hari Singh Bhangi had advanced into the Jhang region and imposed tribute on Inayatullah.

A larger Sikh campaign followed in 1764. The Sials resisted the Bhangi advance but were defeated. Jhang, Khushab and Chiniot were seized, with the conquered territory falling to Jhanda Singh Bhangi. Administration of the newly acquired possessions was placed under Karam Singh Dulu.

The Bhangi conquest extended Sikh authority considerably farther into south-western Punjab. Jhang and Chiniot remained among the possessions associated with the Bhangi chiefs during the following years.

=== Recovery of Chiniot ===
Bhangi authority weakened after the deaths of several of its leading chiefs in the Battle of Pathankot. Inayatullah eventually stopped paying tribute and took advantage of the decline to recover Chiniot from Bhangi control. The recovery did not permanently remove Sikh influence from the area. Chiniot was later recaptured by Karam Singh Dulu before the end of Inayatullah's reign.

=== Later Sikh incursions ===
The decline of the Bhangi Misl was accompanied by the rise of Maha Singh, chief of the Sukerchakia Misl. Following the weakening of Bhangi power, Maha Singh moved against several of their possessions. His forces plundered Pindi Bhattian, attacked Sahiwal, seized Isakhel and Musakhel and sacked Jhang.

The Bhangis also lost a number of their territories to Maha Singh during this period.

In 1782, Desa Singh Bhangi attempted to recover territories lost during the decline of Bhangi authority. He fought a series of engagements with Maha Singh and was killed in the fighting.

== Death ==
Inayatullah died in 1787. By the end of his reign, the political position of the Sials had been reduced from that inherited from Walidad Khan. Jhang had been conquered by the Bhangis during the 1760s, Inayatullah had been forced to pay tribute, and control of Chiniot had changed hands more than once during the struggles between the Sials and Sikh chiefs.

== Bibliography ==
- Chhabra, G. S. (1960). The Advanced Study in History of the Punjab. Vol. 1. Jullundur City: Sharanjit.
- Gupta, Hari Ram (1978). History of the Sikhs: Evolution of Sikh Confederacies, 1708–1769. Vol. 2 (3rd ed.). New Delhi: Munshiram Manoharlal.
- Singh, Bhagat (1993). A History of the Sikh Misals. Patiala: Publication Bureau, Punjabi University.
- Singh, Dalbir (2010). Rise, Growth and Fall of Bhangi Misal (PDF) (PhD thesis). Patiala: Department of History, Punjabi University.
