= Siege of Rohtas (1764) =

Capture of the Rohtas Fort, Jhelum, Punjab

- Part of the Afghan–Sikh Wars
Date	1764
Location	Rohtas Fort, near Jhelum, Punjab region
Result	Sikh victory
Territorial changes	Rohtas Fort captured by the Sikh Misls

Belligerents
Sukerchakia Misl; Bhangi Misl	Durrani Empire

Commanders and leaders
Charat Singh Sukerchakia; Gujjar Singh Bhangi	Sarbuland Khan (POW)

Strength
Unknown	12,000 soldiers

Casualties and losses
Unknown	Unknown

The Siege of Rohtas took place in 1764 when Sikh leaders Charat Singh of the Sukerchakia Misl and Gujjar Singh of the Bhangi Misl laid siege to the Rohtas Fort, which was commanded by Durrani General Sarbuland Khan. The siege resulted in the capture of the fort by the Sikh Misls.

== Background ==
After the Battle of Sirhind in 1764, the Sikh Misls aimed to strengthen their control over neighboring territories, significantly weakening the Durrani influence in the Punjab region. Prominent leaders of the Taruna Dal, Charat Singh Sukerchakia and Hari Singh Bhangi, expanded their domains northwestward and southward, respectively.

In early summer, Charat Singh, accompanied by Gujjar Singh Bhangi, marched towards Rohtas.

== Siege and battle ==
The Afghan Faujdar of Rohtas, Sarbuland Khan, the uncle of Ahmad Shah Abdali, resisted the advancing Sikh forces but was defeated and retreated to the Rohtas Fort. The combined Sikh forces of Sukerchakia and Bhangi Misl laid siege to the Rohtas Fort. Seeing no progress, Charat Singh staged a feigned retreat, successfully luring the Afghan forces out of the fort. In the ensuing battle, the Afghans were defeated, and Sarbuland Khan was captured. The Afghan Faujdar earned respect from the Sikhs, and, impressed by their kindness, he supposedly offered his service to Charat Singh. However, Charat Singh declined the offer, instead ransoming him for two lakhs of rupees and permitting him to return to his homeland Afghanistan.

== Aftermath ==
Under Charat Singh's leadership, the Sikhs began to take control of the surrounding areas and successfully suppressed numerous rebellions such as that of the Gakhar chieftain Muqarrab Khan. Charat Singh started building his own forts in Pind Dadan Khan and assigned them to his commanders for control. After securing his control in the Jehlum region, Charat Singh captured parts of the Salt Range and once again deployed his men to patrol the area and control the restive tribes in the region. Charat Singh now governed the region stretching from the Indus to the Jhelum and extending up to the Salt Range.
