= Sikh invasion of South-Western Punjab =

Bhangi invasion of South-Western Punjab
- Part of the expansion of the Sikh Confederacy
Date	c. April–June 1764
Location	South-western Punjab, including Lamma, Nakka, Multan, Derajat, Jhang, Khushab and Chiniot
Result	Sikh victory
Territorial changes	Sikh capture of Lamma and Nakka; seizure of Jhang, Khushab and Chiniot; extension of Sikh authority into Multan and Derajat

Belligerents
Bhangi Misl; Nakai Misl	Sial dynasty Baluchi chiefs of Derajat

Commanders and leaders
Hari Singh Bhangi; Heera Singh Nakai; Jhanda Singh Bhangi; Karam Singh Dulu	Inayatullah Khan Sial (surrendered); Ali Mohammad Khakwani

The Bhangi invasion of South-Western Punjab was a Sikh military campaign in the south-west of Punjab between April and June 1764. During this time, Sikh forces captured Multan, crossed the Indus River, and pushed into the Derajat and Jhang regions. The campaign was led by Hari Singh Bhangi, while his son, Jhanda Singh Bhangi, took control of Jhang, Khushab, and Chiniot.

== Background ==
By 1764, Sikh forces were active in multiple parts of Punjab. Early in their south-western push, they took control of Lamma and Nakka, areas that later became part of the Nakai Misl. The Taruna Dal split into two groups, one under Hari Singh Bhangi, who invaded the southwestern part of Punjab, and the other led by Charat Singh Sukerchakia, who devastated the northwestern part of Punjab.

== Campaign ==
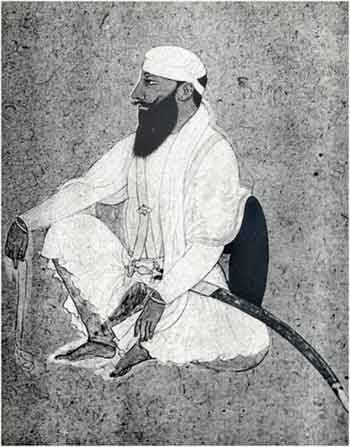
Jhanda Singh Bhangi, the son of Hari Singh Bhangi

After the initial advance, Hari Singh Bhangi moved against Multan. The city was captured and plundered. Bahawalpur was also plundered before the invasion of Multan.

From Multan, the Sikh force crossed the Indus River and devastated Derajat. Tribute was taken from Baluchi chiefs in the districts of Muzaffargarh, Dera Ghazi Khan and Dera Ismail Khan. On the return march, local chiefs in the Pind Dadan Khan region paid 4,000 rupees in tribute.

The Sikh force then turned toward the Sials of Jhang. The Sials resisted but were defeated, after which the territories of Jhang, Khushab and Chiniot were seized by the Bhangis. These territories fell to the share of Jhanda Singh Bhangi. The administration of the conquered area was entrusted to Karam Singh Dulu, a Bhangi chief.

Map of the Sial Dynasty

== Aftermath ==
Qazi Nur Muhammad was an 18th-century Persian chronicler who accompanied Ahmad Shah Abdali during his late 1764 invasion of India. recorded that Multan was plundered and severely affected during the Sikh attack. Around six months after the Sikh occupation of Chiniot, he stopped by the city on his way to Lahore and noted the following in his work titled Jangnama.:

The city had been ruined by the atrocities of the Sikhs. All the people of the place were in trouble and misery. The whole town from inside and its suburbs lay in ruin. Its buildings had been pulled down and all the mosques were deserted. They were spoiled by the dung and fodder of their horses. The learned people, nobles and the Sayyids of the city led a miserable life. When the Dogs (Sikhs) partitioned this land, the city became the Jagir of the accursed Jhanda (Singh Bhangi). They divided the whole country, Sarhind, Lahore, Panjab, Multan, Jhang, Khushab and the Chenab among themselves.

The Sikh successes in south-western Punjab in 1764 were followed by the renewed invasion of Ahmad Shah Abdali, who crossed the Indus in October 1764 with an army of 18,000 men after receiving reports of Sikh advances and the failure of his generals.

== Bibliography ==
- Gupta, Hari Ram (1952). A History of the Sikhs: Evolution of the Sikh Confederacies, 1739–1768. Minerva Book Shop.
- Gupta, Hari Ram (1978). History of the Sikhs: Evolution of Sikh Confederacies, 1708–1769. Vol. 2 (3rd illustrated ed.). Munshiram Manoharlal Publishers.
- Gupta, Hari Ram (1999). History of the Sikhs: The Sikh Commonwealth or Rise and Fall of Sikh Misls. Vol. 4 (3rd illustrated ed.). Munshiram Manoharlal Publishers. ISBN 9788121501651.
- Singh, Dalbir (2010). Rise, Growth and Fall of Bhangi Misal (Thesis). Department of History, Punjabi University Patiala.
