= Karam Singh Dulu =

- Sardar; The Serpent

Bhangi Chief of Chiniot, Jhang, and Maghiana
- Successor: Jassa Singh Dulu
- Issue: Jassa Singh Dulu
Names
- Karam Singh Bhangi
- Dynasty: Bhangi Misl
- Religion: Sikhism
- Occupation: Sikh chieftain

Karam Singh Dulu (also Karam Singh Dullu or Karam Singh Dulu Bhangi) was an eighteenth-century Sikh chieftain of the Bhangi Misl who held Chiniot, Jhang, Maghiana, and adjoining territory in the Chenab region of Punjab. He emerged during the Bhangi expansion into the Sial country in the mid-eighteenth century and became one of the notable Sikh sardars of western Punjab. His territory was defended by eight forts, yielded an annual revenue of about fourteen lakhs of rupees, and passed to his son Jassa Singh Dulu before its annexation by Ranjit Singh in the early nineteenth century.

== Rise to prominence ==
Karam Singh belonged to the Bhangi Misl, the largest of the Sikh confederacies in the later eighteenth century. His birthplace, year of birth, parentage, and early upbringing are not securely known. He entered prominence during the Bhangi advance into the Sial-held tract of central and western Punjab.

By the mid-1760s, the Bhangis had overrun the Sial territories of Jhang, Khushab, and Chiniot. In the territorial settlement that followed, the administration of Jhang and Chiniot was placed under Karam Singh Dulu by Hari Singh Bhangi the Misaldar of the Bhangi Misl.

Karam Singh subsequently established himself as one of the principal Bhangi chiefs in the Chenab region. In later enumerations of Bhangi possessions, his holdings were listed as Badoke, Chiniot, Jhang, and Kotli Loharan.

== Territorial rule ==
Karam Singh Dulu ruled from the Jhang–Chiniot tract bordering the Chenab River. His possessions included Jhang, Chiniot, Khewa, Kot Kamalia, Mirak, and Shorkot, together with a large tract between the Ravi, the Chenab, and the Jhelum extending toward Mankera. He is also identified as chief of Chiniot–Jhang–Maghiana.

His military and fiscal resources were considerable. He maintained about 2,000 cavalry and 1,000 infantry as a permanent force and, in emergencies, could muster 6,000 horse and 3,000 foot. His territory contained eight strong forts and yielded roughly fourteen lakhs of rupees annually.

The epithet Dulu was later called as the "snake" or "serpent" by his contemporaries.

== Campaigns and political activity ==
Karam Singh’s power grew from the Bhangi conquest of Sial territory, where he seized a large portion of Walidad Khan Sial’s former lands. After Walidad Khan died in 1747, his successor, Inayatullah, made numerous attempts to reclaim the territory, engaging in twenty-two battles against Karam Singh, but ultimately failed to win it back.

He also took part in the struggles among Sikh chiefs in the Jammu frontier. In the contest over Karianwala and Shakargarh, he joined Gujjar Singh Bhangi and Haqiqat Singh Kanhaiya against Brij Raj Deo of Jammu and Mahan Singh Sukerchakia. Their combined operations ended with the capture of Karianwala.

During the siege of Sodhra, Karam Singh reinforced Sahib Singh Bhangi of Gujrat against Mahan Singh Sukerchakia. The siege was lifted after Mahan Singh collapsed in battle and was taken back to Gujranwala, where he died shortly afterward.

== Personal life ==
Karam Singh's son was Jassa Singh Dulu, who succeeded him in Chiniot.

== Death ==
Karam Singh died before 1802, when Chiniot was in the possession of Jassa Singh Dulu. In that year Ranjit Singh marched against Chiniot. Jassa Singh shut himself in the fort and resisted for about two months before evacuating the place and surrendering. By 1803 he had been expelled from the territory.

== Bibliography ==
- Gupta, Hari Ram (1944). History of the Sikhs. Vol. III: Trans-Sutlej Sikhs, 1769–1799. Lahore: The Minerva Book Shop.
- Gupta, Hari Ram (1978). History of the Sikhs. Vol. II: Evolution of Sikh Confederacies (1708–69). New Delhi: Munshiram Manoharlal Publishers Pvt. Ltd.
- Gupta, Hari Ram (1992). History of the Sikhs. Vol. IV: The Sikh Commonwealth or Rise and Fall of Sikh Misls. New Delhi: Munshiram Manoharlal Publishers Pvt. Ltd.
- Gupta, Hari Ram (1999). History of the Sikhs. Vol. V: The Sikh Lion of Lahore (Maharaja Ranjit Singh, 1799–1839). New Delhi: Munshiram Manoharlal Publishers Pvt. Ltd.
- Singh, Dalbir (2010). Rise, Growth and Fall of Bhangi Misal (PhD thesis). Patiala: Punjabi University.
