= Siege of Lahore (1761) =

Sikh capture of Lahore, Punjab from the Durrani Empire

- Part of Afghan–Sikh Wars
- The Sikhs under Jassa Singh Ahluwalia triumphantly enter Lahore
Date	27 October 1761
Location	Lahore
Result	Sikh victory

Belligerents
Sikh Confederacy; Ahluwalia Misl; Sukerchakia Misl; Ramgarhia Misl; Bhangi Misl; Kanhaiya Misl; Patiala State	Durrani Empire

Commanders and leaders
Jassa Singh Ahluwalia; Charat Singh; Jassa Singh Ramgarhia; Hari Singh Dhillon; Jai Singh Kanhaiya; Ala Singh	Khwaja Obed

Strength
Unknown	12,000

The siege of Lahore took place in 1761 when the Sikhs besieged Lahore and captured it after facing no opposition from Durrani forces.

== Background ==
After victory in the Third Battle of Panipat, Ahmad Shah Durrani sent General Nuruddin with 12,000 soldiers to chastise Sikhs. Charat Singh Sukerchakia attacked Nuruddin's army at Sialkot. Nuruddin escaped and the Sikhs won a great victory in the 1761 Battle of Sialkot.

Afghan General Khwaja Obed Khan was also sent to punish Sikhs. Khwaja Obed wanted to attack Charat Singh at Gujranwala but before he could, he was attacked by Sikhs led by Jassa Singh Ahluwalia, Hari Singh Dhillon, and Jai Singh Kanheya. The Afghan forces were surrounded and Khwaja fled the battlefield. Sikhs once again defeated the Afghans in the 1761 Battle of Gujranwala.

== Siege of Lahore ==
The Sikhs gained enough confidence to capture Lahore after back to back victories. They met at Amritsar on 27 October 1761, the day of Diwali, and decided to capture Lahore. The Sikhs besieged Lahore, Khawaja obed did not oppose the Sikh attack, Sikhs entered the Lahore city, plundered the city, captured the Royal mint and struck coins bearing Sikka Zad dar Jahan Bafazat-i-Akal, mulk-i-Ahmad garift Jassa Kalal, which means 'Coin struck in the World by the Grace of the Immortal in the Country of Ahmad captured by Jassa Kalal'
