= Battle of Pipli Sahib =

Sikh-Afghan battle

- Part of Afghan–Sikh Wars and Indian campaign of Ahmad Shah Durrani
Date	17 October 1762
Location	Amritsar
Result	Disputed, see Result

Belligerents
Sikh Confederacy	Durrani Empire

Commanders and leaders
Jassa Singh Ahluwalia; Charat Singh; Jassa Singh Ramgarhia; Baghel Singh; Other Notable Leaders	Ahmad Shah Abdali

Strength
60,000	Unknown

The Battle of Pipli Sahib, also known as Battle of Amritsar, was fought by the Sikh Misls and the Durrani Empire.

Seeking to avenge past defeats, the Sikhs rallied and engaged in conflict with the Afghans. Gathering at Amritsar, Ahmad Shah led his army to meet the Sikhs. The battle began with a Sikh attack, ongoing with a solar eclipse. The battle concluded in the night when both sides withdrew to their camps. During this, Ahmad Shah withdrew to Lahore, before returning to find the Sikhs as having withdrawn into the Lakhi Jungle.

The battle's authenticity is speculated by historians, and the result is just as convoluted.

== Background ==
After the Battle of Kup, the Sikhs decided to get revenge for the dead and avenge their defeats. Ahmad Shah Abdali had returned to Lahore. He sent an ambassador to negotiate peace with the Sikh leaders and prevent further losses of his ken which the Sikh were desperate to do. However, when this ambassador arrived at the Sikh camps the Sikhs plundered him and his followers and then drove them away. Abdali, becoming furious, quickly arrived at the outskirts of Amritsar.

== Battle ==
The Sikhs had gathered around at Amritsar to celebrate Diwali which was on October of 17 that year. The Sikhs attacked the Afghans vehemently. The battle was fought under a total solar eclipse. The battle went on furiously from early morning till late night. Both sides decided to stop fighting for night and resume fighting in the morning, but during the night Ahmad Shah Abdali and his forces decided to withdraw to Lahore during the night. Returning later, the Shah, looking to engage the Sikhs again, found that they had withdrawn into the Lakhi Jungle.

== Result ==
The battle itself, and its result, are not accepted by all historians. John Malcolm, Jadunath Sarkar, George Forster, and Sinha all doubt that the battle actually occurred. However, it is accepted by Hari Ram Gupta and Ganda Singh.

Some sources simply state that both sides withdrew to their camps after the battle, and that Ahmad Shah returned to Lahore afterward, later returning to see the Sikhs had also withdrawn, with the battle remaining indecisive. Other sources state the battle was possibly a Sikh victory.

== Aftermath ==
While Abdali was hunting in the Majha territory, he ordered the capture of a body of Sikh horsemen within the area. Immediately after, another body arrived and engaged Abdali's men, whereupon a Sikh unsuccessfully attempted to strike Abdali. Some Sikhs were killed by the Afghans while the remaining retreated into the jungle.

The Shah left Lahore on December 12, 1762, and Kabuli Mal was appointed the new governor of Lahore.

== See also ==
- Nihang
- Martyrdom and Sikhism
