= Bhuma Singh Bhangi =

Bhuma Singh Bhangi (died 1746) was a Jat Sikh warrior of the 18th century in Punjab and the second leader of the Bhangi Misl succeeding Sardar Chhajja Singh.

Sardar Bhuma Singh was a Dhillon Jat of the village of Hung, near Badhni in present-day Moga district, who made a name for himself in skirmishes with Nadir Shah's troops in 1739. Bhuma Singh's latent genius as an organiser and commander helped the Bhangi misl grow. Historical records indicate he died in the Chhota Ghallughara (massacre) in 1746, while defending the Sikh community, from hostile attacks. Bhuma Singh was childless and had adopted his nephew, Hari Singh. On Bhuma Singh's death in 1746, Hari Singh Bhangi assumed the leadership of the Bhangi Misl. The Bhangi Misl got its name due to Bhuma Singh's addiction of hashish (bhang).

== See also ==
- Sikh Confederacy
- Misl
- Bhangi Misl

Preceded by Chhajja Singh	Second leader of Bhangi Misl –1746	Succeeded by Hari Singh Bhangi
