= Battle of Qarawal =

18th-century South Asian military engagement

- Part of Afghan–Sikh Wars
Date	1764
Location	Qarawal (near Lahore)
Result	Afghan victory

Belligerents
Durrani Empire; Khanate of Kalat	Sukerchakia Misl

Commanders and leaders
Ahmad Shah Durrani; Nasir Khan; Gahram Khan †; Ahmad Khan †	Charat Singh

Strength
18,000 Durrani forces 12,000 from Kalat (Invasion force, unknown present at battle)	Unknown

Casualties and losses
Unknown	Unknown

The Battle of Qarawal was fought between the Sikhs under the command of Charat Singh against the Afghan forces led by Ahmad Shah Abdali and his Kalat ally Mir Nasir Khan I. The battle resulted in a victory for the Afghan forces and forced the Sikhs to withdraw to Amritsar.

== Background ==
After Ahmad Shah withdrew from Qarawal after his sixth campaign, Sikh forces defeated the Afghans at Kasur and Jalandhar Doaba. In early January 1764, Sirhind also fell to Sikh control.

Ahmad Shah subsequently re-mobilized 18,000 men and recruited Nasir Khan of Kalat.

The next morning, news arrived that the Sikhs had attacked Qarawal, with two of the sardars there, Gahram Khan and Ahmad Khan requesting immediate support. Ahmad Khan and his son were killed in the battle.

== Battle ==
As the rest of the Durrani reinforcements came into battle, the Sikhs were routed from the battlefield, and fled from the battle at night.

== Aftermath ==
Following this victory, Ahmad Shah advised Nasir Khan to not fight again in the front ranks of battle. After his battle with Charat Singh, Ahmad Shah received news that the Sikhs had retreated to the city of Amritsar. Ahmad Shah and the Afghan forces entered Amritsar on December 1, 1764. It was at Amritsar that he would get into a skirmish with Baba Gurbaksh Singh along with 29 other Sikh defenders at Shri Harmandir Sahib.It was in this skirmish that all 30 Sikh defenders were killed and the Shri Harmandir Sahib was destroyed under the orders of Ahmad Shah.

== Bibliography ==
- Gupta, Hari (2007). History Of The Sikhs Vol. II Evolution Of Sikh Confederacies (1707-69). Munshiram Manoharlal Publishers Pvt. Ltd. ISBN 978-81-215-0248-1.
- Gupta, Hari Ram (2000). Studies In Later Mughal History Of The Punjab 1707-1793. Sang-e-Meel Publications. pp. 237–240. ISBN 9789693507560.
- Singh, Harbans (1998). The Encyclopedia of Sikhism Volume II E-L (3rd ed.). Punjabi University, Patiala. ISBN 81-7380-204-1.
