= NJSA Government College =

College situated in Punjab, India

The NJSA Government College or Nawab Jassa Singh Ahluwalia Government College, also known as the Randhir College, is a college situated in Kapurthala, in Punjab. Established in 1856 by Maharaja Randir Singh in Kapurthala State as Sanskrit vidyalya, it has many historical buildings used for public services such as district courts, education, and health services. It was first college to be affiliated with the University of Calcutta. In 1857 Nawab Jassa Singh Ahluwalia Government College, and remained so 1882, when University of the Punjab was set up in Lahore. It is named after Nawab Jassa Singh Ahluwalia (1718 – 1783), the founder of Kapurthala State. It is now affiliated with Guru Nanak Dev University, Amritsar.

The college runs many academic and professional courses, in subjects such as information technology, science, history, Punjabi, Sanskrit and computing. It also has large grounds for cricket, volleyball, and a track for athletes.

The college celebrated its 150th anniversary in 2006.

== Notable alumni ==
- Sardar Swaran Singh, union cabinet minister.
- Pramod Moutho, actor
