= Battle of Harnaulgarh =

Battle in 1762 between the Durrani Empire and the Sikh Misls of Dal Khalsa

- Part of Indian Campaign of Ahmad Shah Durrani
Date	May 1762
Location	Harnaulgarh, 30 miles from Sirhind
Result	Sikh victory
Territorial changes	Durranis driven out from Sirhind.

Belligerents
Sikh Misls	Durrani Empire

Commanders and leaders
Jassa Singh Ahluwalia; Charat Singh	Zain Khan Sirhindi

The Battle of Harnaulgarh was fought between the Durrani Empire and the Sikh Misls of Dal Khalsa in 1762.

== Battle ==
The Sikhs assembled in May 1762 and plundered the baggage of the Mughal governor of Sirhind, Zain Khan Sirhindi. The Sikh forces then marched and fought a severe battle with the Durranis at Harnaulgarh, a place 30 miles from Sirhind. The Sikhs secured a decisive victory at Harnaulgarh by driving away the Durranis and the defeated governor of Sirhind, Zain Khan Sirhindi, was forced to pay tribute of Rs. 50,000 to the Sikhs as a penalty for his loss.
