= Charat Singh =

Sikh warrior and leader (1721/30–1770/74)

- Sardar
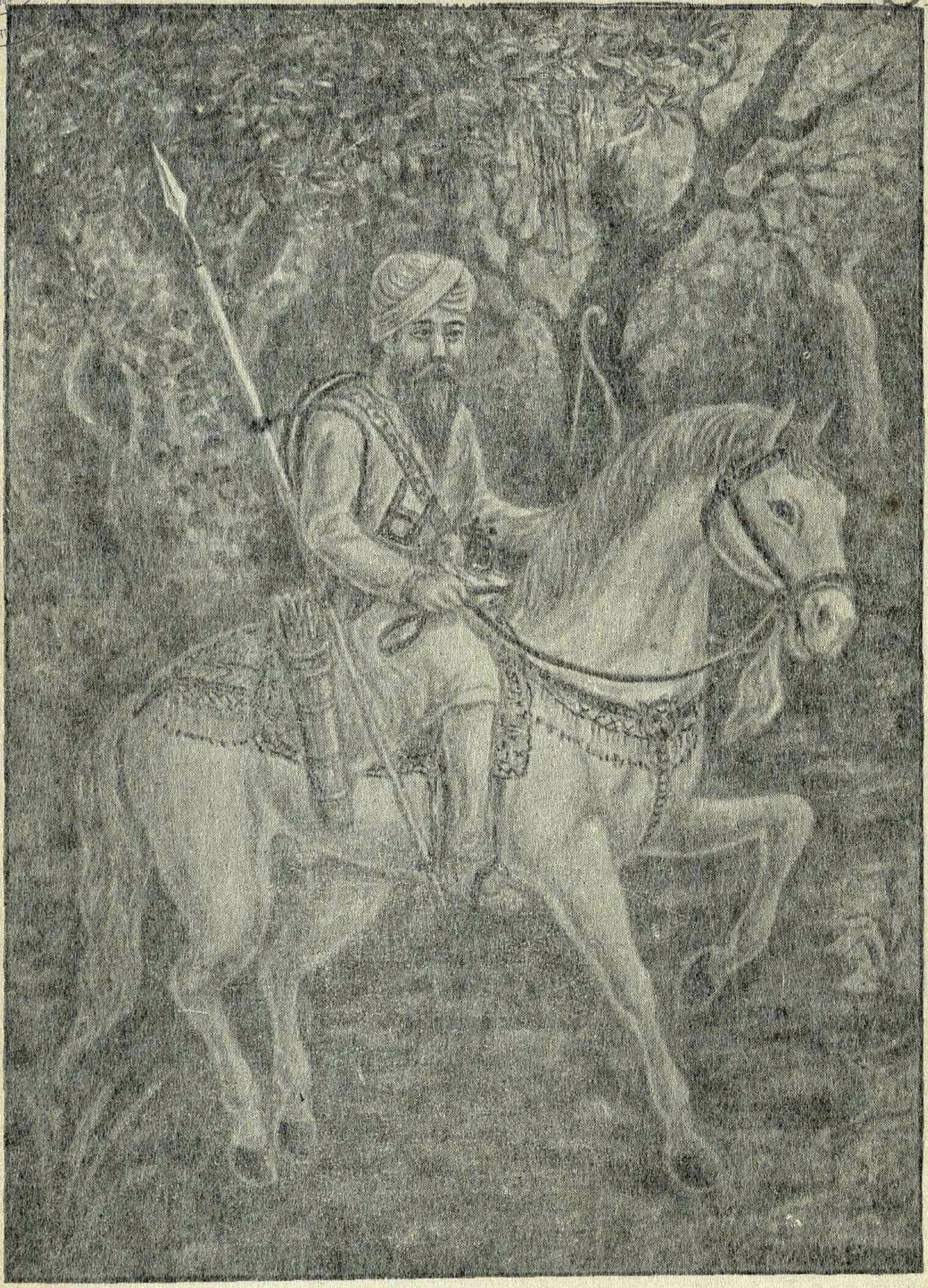

Sardar of Sukerchakia Misl
- Reign: 1752–1770/1774
- Predecessor: Naudh Singh
- Successor: Maha Singh
- Born: 1721 or 1732 Gujranwala, Subah of Lahore, Mughal Empire
- Died: 1770 or 1774 (aged 41–42); Sukerchakia Misl, Gujranwala, Sikh Confederacy
- Spouse: Desan Kaur (m. 1756)
- Issue: Maha Singh; Sahej Singh; Sher Singh; Raj Kaur; Saher Kaur
- Dynasty: Sukerchakia
- Father: Naudh Singh
- Mother: Lali Kaur

Sardar Charat Singh (1721–1770 or 1733–1774), also romanised as Charhat Singh, was the founder of Sukerchakia Misl, father of Mahan Singh, and the grandfather of Ranjit Singh, the first Maharaja of the Sikh Empire. He distinguished himself at an early age in campaigns against Ahmad Shah Abdali and along with 150 horsemen split from the Singhpuria Misl to establish the Sukerchakia Misl, a separate grouping with its distinct guerilla militia.

== Early life ==
Charat Singh was born to Chaudhary Naudh Singh (died 1752) and Lali Kaur in a Sandhawalia Jat Sikh family. His grandfather was Budh Singh (1670 – 1718), a disciple of Guru Gobind Singh. In 1756 he married Desan Kaur Waraich, a daughter of Sikh ruler Amir Singh Waraich. The couple had four children, two sons, Maha Singh and Suhej Singh followed by two daughters, Bibi Raj Kaur (not to be confused with the wife of Mahan Singh) and Saher Kaur.

== Matrimonial alliances ==
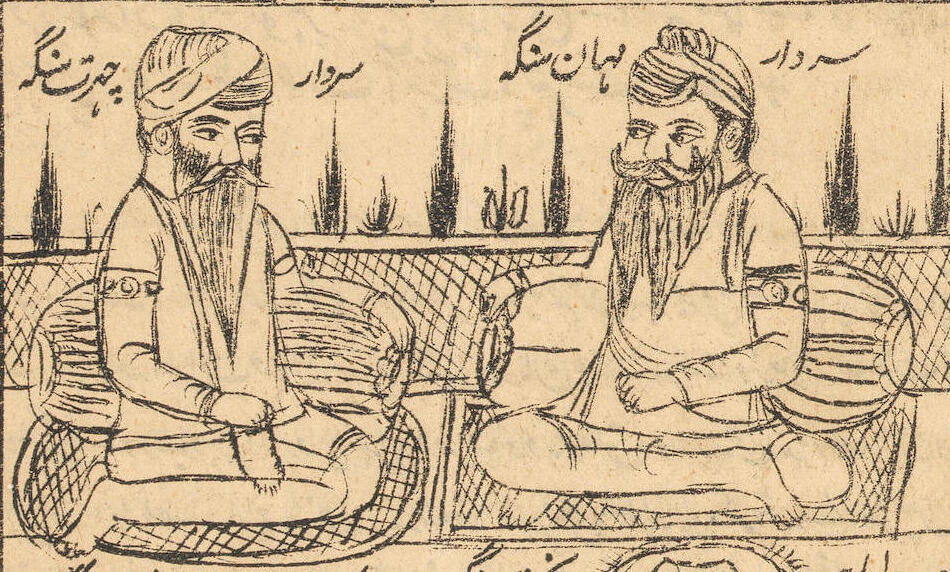
Charat Singh (left) and Mahan Singh (right), detail from a larger illustration, lithograph, Umdat-ut-Tawarikh (vol. II), Albert Press, Lahore, 1886

"Charat Singh strengthened his position by matrimonial alliances.

- Charat's Singh's son Mahan Singh was married to the daughter of Jai Singh Mann of Mogalchak-Mananwala.
- Dal Singh Kalianwala of Alipur renamed Akālgarh was married to the sister of Charat Singh.
- Sohel Singh Bhangi was married to the daughter of Charat Singh.
- Sahib Singh Bhangi, son of Gujar Singh, was married to another daughter, Raj Kaur.

To establish a prominent place for himself among the Sikhs Charat Singh built a fort at Amritsar to the north of the city." – Hari Ram Gupta

== Military campaigns ==
In 1761, After the Third Battle of Panipat, Ahmad Shah Durrani sent his general Nur-ud-din to punish the Sikhs. He crossed the river Jhelum in August 1761 at Khushab and marched up the left bank of the river, He destroyed three largest towns of the Doab, Bhera, Miani and Chak Sanu, The first two towns rose from the ruins afterwards, while the third remained deserted. Charat Singh along with other Sikhs checked his advance on the eastern bank of river Chenab. Afghans, 12,000 in number, fled to Sialkot, which was immediately invested by Charat Singh, Nur-ud-din escaped on the eighth day to Jammu in the disguise of a beggar. His troops surrendered, but were allowed to go in safety. This success made Charat Singh a front-rank leader among the Sikh sardars. He also seized some guns and other arms. When all was over Charat Singh made a triumphant entry into his capital Gujranwala.

Charat Singh's victory over Nur-ud -din deeply perturbed Khwajah Abed Khan, Durrani's governor of Lahore. He decided to check the growing power of Charat Singh. Besides he wanted to impress upon his master, the Durrani Emperor, that he was quite active in discharging his duties. He invested Charat Singh's fort of Gujranwala in September, 1761. Charat Singh continued fighting from inside the fort. The other Sikh sardars, Jassa Singh Ahluwalia, Bhangi chiefs Hari Singh, Jhanda Singh Dhillon, Lahna Singh and Gujar Singh, Jai Singh Kanhaiya, and Sobha Singh came for the relief of Charat Singh and encamped 6 km away from Gujranwala. Khwajah Abed realized that he would be besieged. In the night he took to flight without striking a blow. A number of swivels, pieces of cannon, horses, camels, etc., fell into the hands of the Sikhs, when all was over.

In the beginning of January, 1762, Ahmad Shah Durrani came to the Panjab to crush the Sikhs like the Marathas in the previous year. In the Battle of Kup near Malerkotla. Ahmad Shah suddenly pounced upon the encamped Sikhs on February 5, 1762, and killed about 25,000 Sikhs (the mass murder is known as Vadda Ghalughara). On this occasion Charat Singh played a dominant role in resisting the enemy and raising the spirit of the Sikhs.

In January, 1764, the Sikhs decided to punish Jani Khan and Mani Khan of Morindah as they had surrendered Mata Gujri and Guru Gobind Singh's two youngest sons to Wazir Khan of Sarhind . On this occasion Charat Singh posted his troops on the road to Sarhind to check any troops coming from that direction, He fought in the battle of Sirhind against Zain Khan Sirhindi, but took no territory as he had his eyes on the north-west Panjab. Charat Singh took possession of parganahs of Gujranwala, Qila Didar Singh, Qila Mian Singh, Qila Sahib Singh covering the northern half of Gujranwala tahsil.

In March of 1765 the Afghan army was attacked by Sikh forces shortly after crossing the Sutlej River near Machhiwara. The Sikh right wing was led by Charat Singh, alongside several other Sikh chiefs, while the centre was commanded by Jassa Singh Ahluwalia. Charat Singh led a strong assault against the Afghan flank and later launched a fierce attack on the reinforcements under Nasir Khan. Although the Sikhs fought aggressively and briefly threatened the Afghan position, they were unable to break the Afghan lines and eventually withdrew from the battlefield. The following day the Sikhs again attacked from multiple directions, with Charat Singh taking part in the assaults. However, the Afghans maintained their formation and repelled the attacks. After prolonged fighting and suffering losses, the Sikh forces were defeated and withdrew, allowing Ahmad Shah’s army to continue its march.

In May 1767, Charat Singh and Gujjar Singh Bhangi marched upon Jhelum, Its Gakhar Chief fled away to the fort of Rohtas for shelter. Charat Singh entrusted Jhelum town to Dada Ram Singh.

During the siege of the fort of Rohtas, Sarfaraz Khan, the commandant of Ahmad Shah Durrani, requested the help of Nawab Sarbuland Khan, the Governor of Kashmir. Nawab Sarbuland Khan failed to arrive in time as Charat Singh defeated Sarfaraz Khan and captured the fort. When Sarbuland Khan arrived at the fort, Charat Singh marched to oppose Sarbuland Khan with his 12,000 soldiers. Charat Singh defeated Sarbuland Khan and captured him, imprisoning him in the Rohtas fort. The Nawab paid a ransom of two lakhs of rupees and thus secured his release. After the conquest of Rohtas, Charat Singh then subdued the rebellious chiefs and zamindars of the neighborhood and seized the parganahs of Dhanni, Pothohar, Chakwal, Jalalpur, and sayyidpur, after which the whole district made submission to him.

== Death ==
In 1774, he invaded Jammu with Jai Singh of the Kanheya Misl to aid the eldest son of Ranjit Deo, Brij Raj Deo, against his father. The Bhangi Misl joined the side of Ranjit Deo against him. During the preparations for battle a matchlock exploded and killed him. During a battle the next day Jandha Singh, the leader of the Bhangi Misl was killed and both Misls retreated from the fight.

== Legacy ==
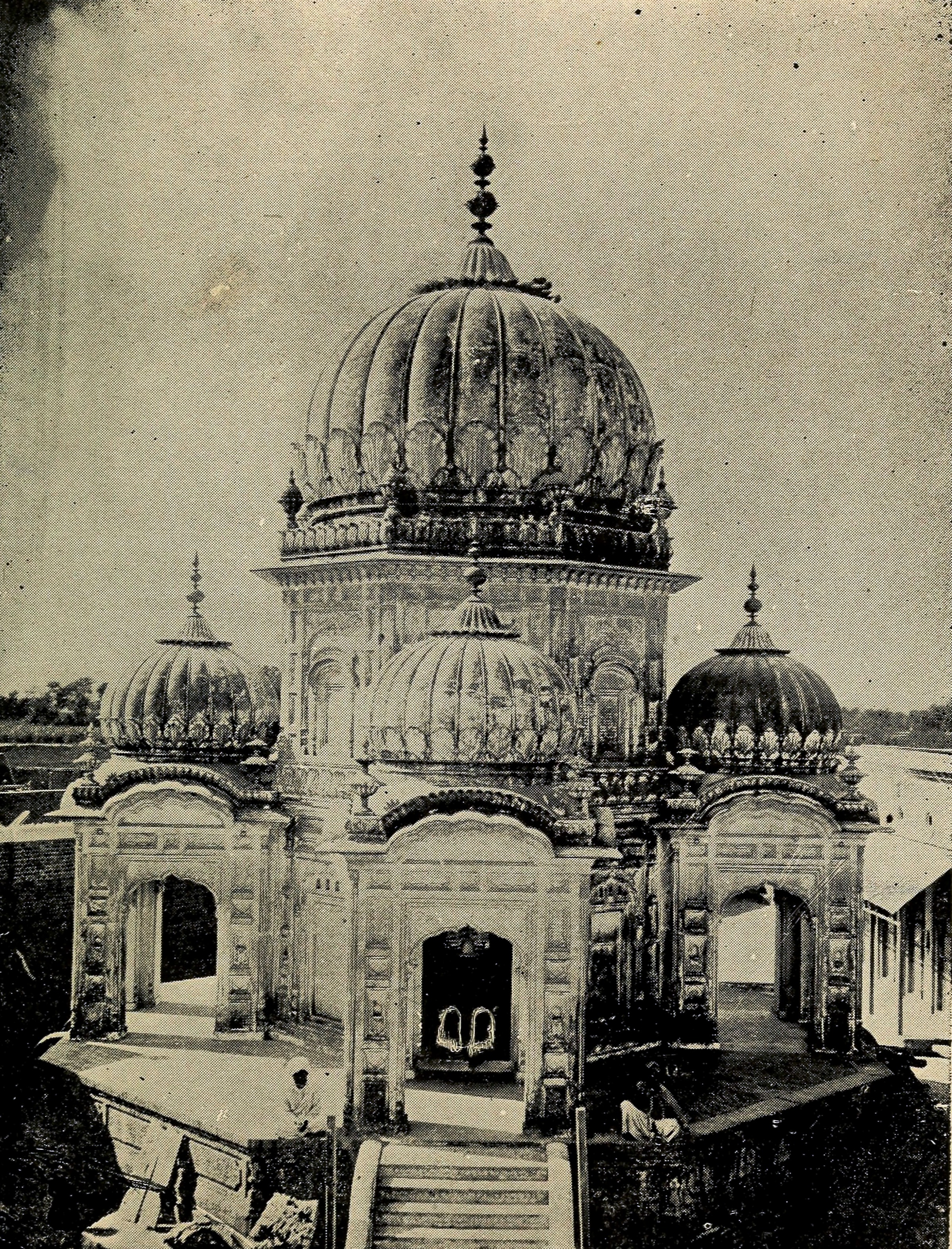
Shrine of Acharya Vijayanand Suri located in Gujranwala that some have disputed as being the samadhi of Charat Singh. Photograph from Chicago Prashnottar, 1918

A samadhi (Indic cenotaph tomb) of Charat Singh is believed by some to be located at Gujranwala, near the Sheranwala Bagh. Jains dispute this and claim the structure is a Jain temple built in memory of a Jain scholar named Acharya Vijayanand Suri, whose father served in the military of Maharaja Ranjit Singh as an official. This theory is further refuted by the Umdat-ut-Tawarikh, a chronicle on the reign of Ranjit Singh and his successors by Sohan Lal Suri, the court recorder of the Sikh Empire. The chronicle states that Ranjit Singh, after leaving a village named Halla, paid a visit to his grandfather's samadhi on 5 October 1838 located near a village named Jalal. It further states he made an ardas and a donation of 200 rupees. After the visit, he left for a village called Karala. Therefore, the samadhi of Charat Singh is located near a village named Jalal, not Gujranwala.

Preceded by Naudh Singh	Leader of the Sukerchakia Misl unknown – 1770	Succeeded by Maha Singh

== Battles fought by Charat Singh ==
- Battle of Eminabad (1761)
- Battle of Sialkot (1761)
- Battle of Gujranwala (1761).
- Sikh Occupation of Lahore.
- Battle of Harnaulgarh (1762)
- Battle of Kup
- Battle of Pipli Sahib
- Battle of Kasur (1763)
- Battle of Sialkot (1763).
- Siege of Gujranwala (1763)
- Battle of Chenab (1764)
- Battle of Qarawal (1764)
- Battle of Sirhind (1764)
- Battle of Rohtas (1764)
- Battle of Sutlej (1765)
- Battle of Rohtas (1767)
- Battle of Jammu (1774)

== In popular culture ==
- In the 2010 historical TV series Maharaja Ranjit Singh telecasted on DD National, the character of Charat Singh is portrayed by Jaspal Singh Sehgal.

== Bibliography ==
- Bakshi, S.R.; Pathak, Rashmi, eds. (2007). Punjab Through the Ages. New Delhi: Sarup and Son. ISBN 978-81-7625-738-1.

Preceded by Naudh Singh	Leader of the Sukerchakia Misl; 1752 –1770	Succeeded by Maha Singh
