= Battle of Gujranwala (1761) =

1761 battle

- Part of Indian Campaign of Ahmad Shah Durrani
Date	September, 1761
Location	Gujranwala
Result	Sikh victory

Belligerents
Sikh Misls	Durrani Empire

Commanders and leaders
Charat Singh; Hari Singh Dhillon	Khawaja Abid Khan; Nur-ud-din

Strength
10,000	12,000

The Battle of Gujranwala was fought between the Durrani Empire and the Sikh Confederacy in September 1761.

== Battle ==
Ahmad Shah Durrani raided India in 1761 and defeated the Marathas in the Third Battle of Panipat in January 1761. He then returned to Kabul and appointed Khawaja Abid Khan the Afghan Governor of Lahore. He wished to defeat the Sikhs in order to secure Afghan positions in the entire Punjab region but was defeated by a Sikh army under Charat Singh in the Battle of Sialkot (1761).

As soon as Nur-ud-din arrived on the banks of the Chenab, he came into conflict with Sardar Charat Singh of the Sukerchakia Misl. Charat Singh, anticipating the trouble, had ready moved from his headquarters at Gujranwala to arrest the further progress of the Afghan general. He was assisted by the other Sikh Misldars who had made a common cause with him. Thus assuming the defensive with his army of trained men, Charat Singh awaited the onslaught of the Afghans whom after a battle of considerable duration he repulsed. He followed up his victory by maintaining a vigorous pursuit of the fugitives.

The Afghans, about 12,000 in number, fleeing pellmell, took refuge in the stronghold of Sialkot. The town was immediately besieged and the strictness of the watch was such as supplies gave out and the garrison was brought to the verge of starvation. Nur-ud-din, finding his men demoralized and starving, abandoned them to their fate and disguised as a beggar sought refuge in flight. The garrison immediately surrendered, and were allowed to depart in peace.

This victory over the troops of Nur-ud-din placed Charat Singh in the front rank of the Sikh leaders, while the loot of Sialkot brought him a quantity of artillery and baggage. When all was over, Charat Singh made a returned to his capital, Gujranwala.

== See also ==
- Sikh Occupation of Lahore.
