= Sial dynasty =

18th century chieftaincy in Punjab

Sial State
- c. 1727–1818
- Map of the state of Jhang in Punjab in the mid-18th century
- Status: Chieftainship
- Capital: Jhang
- Common languages: Punjabi (Jhangvi)
- Ethnic groups: Punjabis (with the Sials being the dynastic rulers)
- Religion: Islam (dynastic)
- Chief
  - 1723–1747: Walidad Khan Sial (founder)
  - 1747–1787: Inayatullah Khan Sial
  - 1787–1798: Sultan Kabir Khan Sial
  - 1798–1818: Ahmad Khan Sial (last)

Area
  - Total: 6,007 sq mi (15,560 km^{2})
Preceded by	Succeeded by
Mughal Empire	Sikh Empire
- Today part of: Pakistan; Punjab

The Sial dynasty (Note: Punjabi (Shahmukhi): سیالان دی سلطنت) was a Punjabi Muslim dynasty that ruled over the Sial state (c. 1727–1818) in central Punjab during the 18th and 19th centuries. It was centred around the city of Jhang.

== History ==
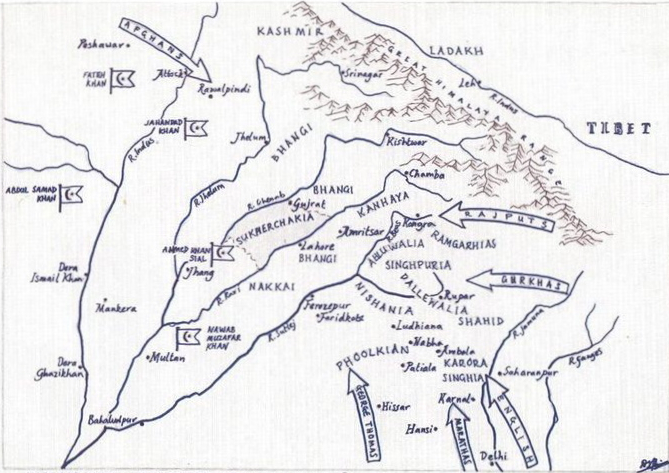
Map of Punjab in 1780, depicting Sial capital of Jhang in the Rachna Doab.

Jhang has been historically the stronghold of the Punjabi Sial tribe for centuries. The 13th Sial chief, Walidad Khan, established a strong regional state in the early-18th century following the decline of the Mughal Empire, which was supported by a large agricultural base along river Chenab. He gradually gained control of the lower Rachna Doab, including the cities of Chiniot, Pindi Bhattian, Jhang and Mankera. The next chief, Inayatullah Khan (r. 1747–1787), was a successful general who won 22 battles against Bhangi Misl and the Multan chiefs. His son, Sultan Kabir Khan was a mild ruler and his reign was peaceful. In 1798, he abdicated in the favour of his son, Ahmed Khan, who proved to be the last Sial ruler.

In 1803, the Sikh ruler, Ranjit Singh, sent his agents to Jhang to demand tribute from Ahmed Khan. Upon his refusal Ranjit Singh marched with his Khalsa Army to Jhang. Ahmed Khan collected a force consisting of Sials, Kharrals and Bharwanas, but was defeated, ultimately being forced to pay a tribute of 60,000 rupees per year. Ranjit Singh annexed the Sial capital of Jhang in 1807, on the pretext that Ahmad Khan Sial was making an alliance with Muzaffar Khan Sadozai of Multan and had signed a secret treaty with the latter. However, Ahmed Khan seized control of Jhang again in 1808 with the help of Pathans of Multan. Ranjit Singh again invaded Sial-ruled territories in 1817 while going on campaign against the Nawab of Multan, and defeated the Sials. The Sial rule came to end in 1818, and Ahmed Khan was awarded a small jagir by Ranjit Singh worth 12,000 rupees in the Amritsar District as compensation.
