= Battle of Sialkot (1761) =

South Asian military engagement

- Part of Indian Campaign of Ahmad Shah Durrani
Date	August, 1761
Location	Sialkot, Punjab
Result	Sikh victory

Belligerents
Sukerchakia Misl	Durrani Empire

Commanders and leaders
Charat Singh; Menander Singh	Timur Shah Durrani; Sardar Jahan Khan

Strength
5,000	12,000

The Battle of Sialkot was fought between Durrani Empire and Sukerchakia Misl of Dal Khalsa in 1761.

== Background ==
Ahmad Shah Durrani raided India and defeated the Marathas in the Third Battle of Panipat like he defeated them at Bararighat and Sikandrabad earlier in 1760. He gave a crushing blow to the Marathas which forced the Marathas to retreat back south to the Deccan and he also appointed Mughal Emperor Shah Alam II as the Emperor of India. Thereafter, he turned towards the Sikhs to defeat them and finish them once and for all because the Sikh insurgents kept harassing his forces in the Punjab region. So he sent his son Timur Shah Durrani along with 12,000 Afghan soldiers to chastise the Sikhs for attacking them near the river Chenab.

== Battle ==
Timur Shah Durrani advanced with his troops to punish the Sikhs but he was repulsed in the battle fought at Chenab River. Following repulsion, Timur Shah Durrani withdrew under siege to Sialkot, northeast of Punjab capital of Lahore. He was further attacked by the Sikhs at Sialkot. The attack was so ferocious that Timur Shah Durrani lost most of his men in the attack. But he, along with his remaining army, continued to battle the Sikhs. The Sikhs were very effective in the battle as they were using guerilla warfare hit-and-run tactics on the Afghan army. Soon, the Sikhs surrounded Sialkot and started a blockade from supplies coming from Kabul to Sialkot. The blockade was very effective as it started to starve the Afghan army who were running low on food. The food shortage made the Durranis desperate to escape from Sialkot. Soon, Timur Shah Durrani found an opening and led his army out of Sialkot. His tired and weary army was starved into surrendering and they quickly withdrew. However the Sikhs did not chase them. Instead, they captured Sialkot. The Afghans along with Timur Shah Durrani had run off to Kabul therefore the battle was a clear victory for the Sikhs.

== Aftermath ==
After defeat at Sialkot, the Afghans were defeated by the Sikhs at the Battle of Gujranwala (1761) in the same year.
