= Ganda Singh Bhangi =

- Died: 1775
- Known for: Sardar of Lahore, Amritsar, Sialkot, Gujrat, Chiniot, Jhang, Bhera, Rawalpindi, Hasan Abdal from 1774-1775
- Successor: Desa Singh Bhangi

Ganda Singh Bhangi (died 1775) was a Sikh warrior and figure of the Bhangi Misl during the late 18th century. Moreover, he was the Sardar of Amritsar, Lahore, Multan, Chiniot, Jhang, Bhera, Rawalpindi, Hasan Abdal, Sialkot and Gujrat in present-day Pakistan. His father was Hari Singh, a known Sikh warrior. He also had a famous warrior brother Jhanda Singh. He was appointed commander in chief of the forces by his older brother Jhanda Singh and after his death he became leader and sardar of the misl. Ganda Singh and his brother Jhanda Singh conquered Multan and controlled it until 1780.

Preceded by Jhanda Singh Bhangi	Sardar of Amritsar, Lahore, Multan, Chiniot, Jhang, Bhera, Rawalpindi, Hasan Abdal, Sialkot; 1774–1775	Succeeded by Desa Singh

== See also ==
- Misl (Sikh Confederacy)
