= Hari Singh Bhangi =

Sikh warlord (died 1765)

Sardar of Bhangi Misl
- Reign: 1746 – 1765
- Predecessor: Bhuma Singh Bhangi
- Successor: Jhanda Singh Bhangi
- Died: 1765; Patiala, Patiala State, Sikh Confederacy (present-day Punjab, India)
- Spouses: Two wives
- Issue: By his first wife Jhanda Singh Bhangi; Ganda Singh Bhangi; By his second wife Charat Singh; Diwan Singh Chachowalia; Desu Singh
- Father: Bhup Singh
- Religion: Sikhism

Hari Singh Bhangi (died 1765) was an 18th-century Sikh warlord and the chief of Bhangi Misl. During the formation of the Dal Khalsa (Sikh army) he was acknowledged as leader of Tarna Dal, and made chief of Bhangi Misl following the death of Bhuma Singh Bhangi, who he was an adopted son of, in 1746. Hari Singh made the Bhangi Misl the most powerful of all the Misls. He has been described as a brave, fearless and great warrior. Under Hari Singh, the Bhangi Misl expanded to Jammu, Lahore, Chiniot, Buria, Jagadhari, Firozpur, Kushab, Majha, Malwa, Sandal Bar and Jhang.

== Biography ==
Hari Singh was born in Panjwar village in district Tarn Taran, tehsil Jhabal. He was adopted by the chief of Bhangi Misl, Bhuma Singh Bhangi. He then took Amrit from him and was initiated into the Khalsa. After the creation of the Dal Khalsa in 1748, Hari Singh was made head of Tarna Dal and Bhangi Misl. Upon taking over Bhangi Misl, he quickly increased its strength to 20,000 and ruled many Misldars under him.

Hari Singh set up his headquarters in Gilwali village in Amritsar district and later in Amritsar, where he built a fort named Qila Bhangian and captured the surrounding areas. Hari Singh next captured Karial and Mirowal. He also joined other Sikh Misls in attacks on Lahore in 1758 and 1760.

In 1757, Ahmed Shah Abdali raided Punjab and Delhi. Hari Singh joined hands with other Sikh Misls to counter Abdali. On March 8, 1758, the joint force besieged an Afghan force of 15,000 in Sirhind. On March 21, Sirhind was captured by the Sikh force. On April 10, they captured Lahore and killed a force of 2,000 Afghans. The prisoners were then forced to rebuild the Golden Temple, which they had desecrated.

In 1760, Hari Singh joined a force of Sikh Misls that captured Lahore on Diwali in 1760 and plundered the surrounding area. They left Lahore after receiving a tribute of 30,000 rupees from the Governor.

In 1761, Hari Singh joined Sikh Misls in the Battle of Gujranwala, where the Sikhs, numbering 10,000, defeated the Afghan force of 12,000. Following this, Hari Singh and other Sikh Misls, led by Jassa Singh Ahluwalia, besieged Lahore and conquered the city on October 27, 1761. There, they struck their own coins and plundered the city.

In 1762, Hari Singh conquered Kot Khwaja Saeed, near Lahore, capturing the Afghan Governor's ammunition and three cannons. He then captured the surrounding area of Bahawalpur, plundered it, and conquered Jammu with a force of 12,000. Hari Singh also marched on the Indus and conquered the Majha, Malwa, and Sandal Bar areas, as well as parts of the Multan.

In 1763, Hari Singh sacked Kasur, along with Jassa Singh Ramgarhia and Jai Singh Kanhaiya. In 1764, he advanced towards Multan. First, he sacked Bahawalpur and ravaged Multan. Then, he crossed the Indus River and received tributes from Baluchi Chiefs in the districts of Muzaffargarh, Dera Ghazi Khan, and Dera Ismail Khan. On his return to Gilwali, he plundered Jhang, Sialkot, and Chiniot and made the Jammu ruler, Ranjit Dev Jamwal, his tributary.

== Death and succession ==
He died in 1765 in battle against Ala Singh. According to Kushwaqt Rae Hari Singh was poisoned to death and was succeeded by his son, Jhanda Singh Bhangi.

== Battles ==
1. Battle of Kalanaur (1755)
2. Battle of Sirhind (1755)
3. Battle of Mahilpur (1757)
4. Battle of Jalandhar (1757)
5. Siege of Sirhind (1758)
6. Battle of Lahore (1758)
7. Battle of Lahore (1760)
8. Battle of Gujranwala (1761)
9. Sikh Occupation of Lahore (1761)
10. Battle of Harnaulgarh (1762)
11. Battle of Kup (1762)
12. Battle of Khwaja Saeed Ka Kot (1762)
13. Battle of Jammu (1762)
14. Battle of Kasur (1763)
15. Battle of Sialkot (1763)
16. Battle of Morinda (1764)
17. Battle of Sirhind (1764)
18. Battle of Lahore (1764)
19. Battle of Bahawalpur (1764)
20. Battle of Multan (1764)
21. Battle of Chenab (1764)
22. Battle of Sutlej (1765)
23. Battle on the Beas (1765)
24. Battle of Lahore (1765)
25. Battle of Lang (1765)

== See also ==
- Sikh Confederacy
- Misl
- Bhangi Misl

Preceded by Bhuma Singh Bhangi	Third leader of Bhangi Misl –1765	Succeeded by Jhanda Singh Bhangi
