= Jassa Singh Ahluwalia =

Sikh leader and founder of Kapurthala State (1718–1783)

Sardar Nawab Sultan‐ul-Qaum Jassa Singh Ahluwalia
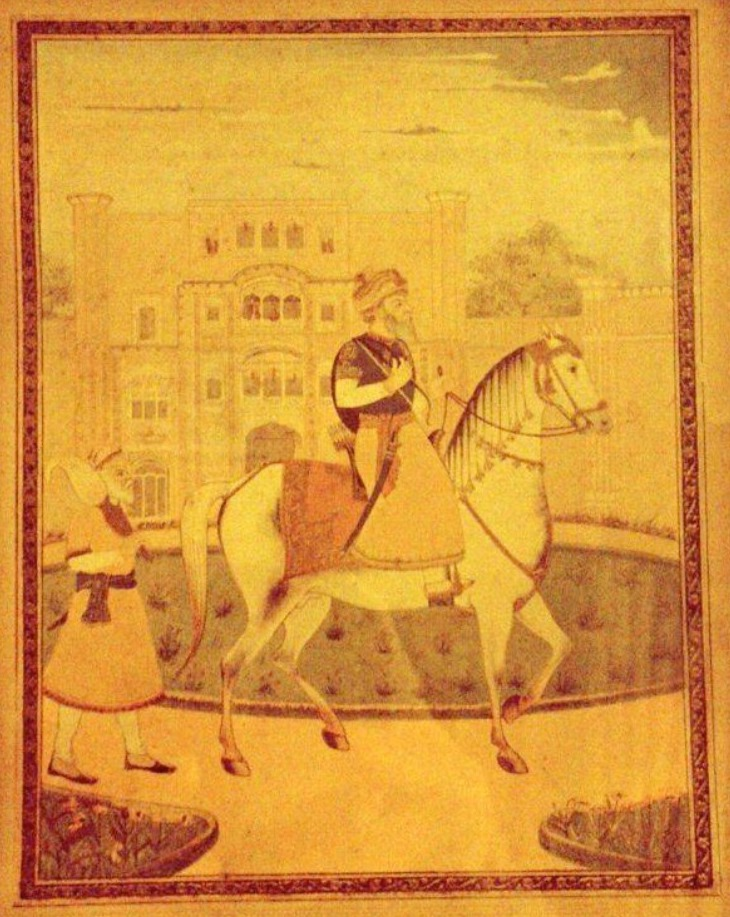
- Equestrian painting of Jassa Singh Ahluwalia on horseback in-front of his haveli with a fly-whisk attendant, circa late 18th century

Jathedar of the Akal Takht
- In office 9 October 1753 – 23 October 1783
- Preceded by: Kapur Singh
- Succeeded by: Phula Singh

4th Jathedar of Buddha Dal
- In office 9 October 1753 – 23 October 1783
- Preceded by: Kapur Singh
- Succeeded by: Naina Singh

Personal details
- Born: Jassa Singh; 3 May 1718 Ahlu, Lahore Subah, Mughal Empire (present-day Lahore district, Punjab, Pakistan)
- Died: 23 October 1783 (aged 65) Bandala, Sikh Confederacy (present-day Amritsar district, Punjab, India)
- Resting place: Cremated at the Dera Baba Attal, Amritsar
- Spouse(s): Mai Sahibji; Sadarani Raj Kaur Sahiba
- Children: 3

Military service
- Battles/wars: Afghan-Sikh Wars; Shujabad (1780); Mahilpur (1757); Lahore (1759); Lahore (1761); Kup (1762); Harnaulgarh (1762); Pipli Sahib (1762); Urmar Tanda (1763); Chamkaur (1764); Sirhind (1764); Delhi (1764); Sikh attacks on Delhi (1764–88); Naurangabad (1745); Rorī Sahib (1746); Manupur (1748); Khanpur (1748); Hoshiarpur (1748); Amritsar (1748); Ram Rauni (1748); Killing of Lakhpat Rai and Jaspat Rai (1746); Multan (1749); Nadaun (1752); Anandpur (1753); Kadar (1755); Battle of Jalandhar (1769); Siege of Patiala (1779); Battle of Delhi (1783); Others; Persian-Sikh War (1739)
- Commander: Dal Khalsa

Jassa Singh Ahluwalia (3 May 1718 – 23 October 1783) was a Sikh leader during the period of the Sikh Confederacy, being the supreme leader of the Dal Khalsa. He was also Misldar (leader or commander) of the Ahluwalia Misl. This period was an interlude, lasting roughly from the time of the death of Banda Bahadur in 1716 to the founding of the Sikh Empire in 1801. He founded the Kapurthala State in 1772.

== Early life ==
Jassa Singh was born on 3 May 1718 in a Kalal Sikh family in the Ahlu village near Lahore, Punjab. Originally known as Jassa Singh Kalal, he styled himself as Ahluwalia after his ancestral village.

Jassa Singh is described as a member of the Kalal or wine distiller caste. During the period of Kharak Singh (r. 1870–1877) a Bhatti Rajput origin story was also created. According to this tradition, one of the Bhatti Rajputs Rana Har Rai had to leave the throne of Jaisalmer for refusing to marry his niece to the Mughal emperor Akbar. However, there is virtually no evidence of this account. According to this account, Har Rai migrated to Punjab, where his descendants married with the Jats, and gradually they became Jats. Starting with Sadhu Singh (also called Sadho or Sadda Singh), they married with Kalals, and the family came to be known as "Ahluwalia Kalal". British administrator Lepel Griffin, who wrote an account of the rulers of Punjab, dismissed this tradition as fictitious.

According to the dynasty's account, Sadhu's Singh's great-grandson Badar Singh and his wife remained childless for a long time, and sought blessings from Guru Gobind Singh. As a result, Jassa Singh was born to them.

== The formation of the Dal Khalsa and the Misls ==
In 1733, Zakariya Khan Bahadur attempted to negotiate peace with the Sikhs by offering them a jagir, the title Nawab to their leader, and unimpeded access to the Harmandir Sahib. After discussion at a Sarbat Khalsa, Kapur Singh was elected leader of the Sikhs and took the title of Nawab. He combined the various Sikh militias into two groups; the Taruna Dal and the Budha Dal, which would collectively be known as the Dal Khalsa. Sikh militias over 40 years of age would be part of the Budha Dal and Sikh militias under 40 years were part of the Taruna Dal. The Taruna Dal was further divided in five jathas, each with 1300 to 2000 men and a separate drum and banner. The area of operations of each Dal, or army, was Hari ke Pattan, where the Sutlej river and Beas River meet; the Taruna Dal would control the area east of Hari ke Pattan while the Budha Dal would control the area west of it. The purpose of the Budha Dal, the veteran group, was to protect Gurdwaras and train the Taruna Dal, while the Taruna Dal would act as combat troops. However, in 1735, the agreement between Zakariya Khan and Nawab Kapur Singh broke down and the Dal Khalsa retreated to the Sivalik Hills to regroup. Later the command of Dal Khalsa was taken by Jassa Singh Ahluwalia who was an able and powerful administrator, even displaced & brought Mughal’s centre of power at the time (Red Fort) under Khalsa flag. He made the foundation of Khalsa firm for future generations to lead. He killed Jaspat Rai, hindu Mughal commander who killed many sikhs.

== Military campaigns ==
=== Nadir Shah's invasion ===
In 1739, Nadir Shah, the Persian ruler, invaded much of Northern India, including Punjab, defeating the Mughals at the Battle of Karnal in 1739, he plundered the city of Delhi (Shahjahanabad) robbing it of treasures like the Peacock throne, the Kohinoor diamond and the Darya-i-Noor diamond. Meanwhile, all the Khalsa bands got together and passed a resolution that Nadir shah had plundered the city of Delhi and now he is taking Indian women as slaves to his country. Sikhs made a plan to free all the slaves. Jassa Singh Ahluwalia was 21 years old at that time, he planned raids to free all slaves. He along with other Sikh bands attacked Nadir shah forces, freed all slaves and sent those slaves back to their families safely.

Ahluwalia participated in many battles as well where he proved himself to be a natural leader. In a 1748 meeting of the Sarbat Khalsa, Nawab Kapur Singh appointed him as his successor. His followers awarded him the title Sultan-ul-Qaum (King of the Nation).

=== The raids of Ahmed Shah Abdali ===
Ahmad Shah Durrani, Nader Shah's senior most general, succeeded to the throne of Afghanistan when Shah was murdered in June 1747. He established his own dynasty, the Sadozai, which was the name of the Pashtun khel to which he belonged.

Starting from December 1747 till 1769, Abdali made a total of nine incursions into the north India. His repeated invasions weakened the Mughal administration of North India. At the Third Battle of Panipat, he along with Nawab of Oudh and Rohillas, defeated the Marathas, who after a treaty signed in 1752 became the protector of the Mughal throne at Delhi and were controlling much of North India, and Kashmir. However they were never able to subdue the Sikhs in the Punjab.

=== Sikhs and Marathas Expel Afghans (1758) ===
In early 1758, Adina Beg sought out allies to expel the Afghans from the Punjab and restore stability. He struck a deal with Sikh leaders Jassa Singh Ahluwalia and Sodhi Vadhbhag Singh, and with their help defeated the Afghans at Mahilpur. By March 1758 he had also enlisted the support of Raghunathrao of the Maratha Empire, and together they expelled the Afghans from Lahore. The Maratha and Sikh forces then gave chase to the retreating Afghans on horseback and were in quick pursuit of them in which they went on to capture Attock and then Peshawar from the Afghans. The Punjab now came under Maratha rule, with Adina appointed subahdar and later Nawab of the Punjab in 1758 in return for a yearly tribute of seventy five lakh of rupees. Raghunathrao and Malhar Rao Holkar, the two commanders-in-chief of the Maratha forces, remained in Lahore for three months after which they retired to the Deccan leaving Adina in sole control.

=== Help of Sikhs to Jats of Bharatpur ===
Suraj Mal (1707–63) was the founder of Jat State of Bharatpur. He was killed on 25 December 1763 near Delhi by Najib ul Daulah, the Ruhilaa chief who had been appointed Mir Bakshi and Regent at Delhi by Ahmed Shah Durrani. Suraj Mal’s son Jawahar Singh sought help from Sikhs who responded with a Sikh force of 40,000 under the command of Sardar Jassa Singh Ahluwalia. The Sikhs crossed the Yamuna on 20 February 1764 and attacked the surrounding areas. Najib ul Daulah rushed back to Delhi thereby relieving the pressure on Bharatpur. Najib ul Daulah suffered another defeat at hands of Sikhs under Ahluwalia after a battle that lasted 20 days in the trans-Yamuna area at Barari Ghat, 20 km north of Delhi. He retired to Red Fort on 9 January 1765 and within a month Sikhs defeated Najib ul Daulah again in Nakhas (horse market) and in Sabzi Mandi.

In December 1765, the Sikhs embarked on their usual expeditions, moving from Saharanpur to Delhi and then to Rewari, causing widespread destruction along the way. During this time, Jawahar Singh was engaged in a conflict with Raja Madho Singh of Jaipur. To strengthen his position, Jawahir Singh hired 25,000 Sikh soldiers led by Jassa Singh Ahluwalia. In response, Madho Singh sought help from the Marathas. Fearing a Maratha attack on Bharatpur, Jawahar Singh made peace with Jaipur, paid a subsidy to the Sikhs, and allowed them to leave. After resolving matters with Jaipur, Jawahar Singh attacked Dholpur, which was controlled by his step-brother Nahar Singh. To fight this battle, Jawahar Singh employed about 7,000 Sikhs, while Nahar Singh enlisted the help of the Marathas. A fierce battle occurred on 13–14 March 1766, in which the Marathas were heavily defeated and abandoned Nahar Singh. Left without support, Nahar Singh sought refuge with Madho Singh of Jaipur, who then bribed the Sikhs to leave Jawahar Singh and return to Punjab.

=== Issued the Coins in Lahore, November 1761 ===
In September 1761, Khawajah Abed Khan, the governor of Lahore, launched a surprise attack on Charat Singh in Gujranwala. Jassa Singh Ahluwalia promptly led the Dal Khalsa to aid Charat Singh, forcing Abed Khan to flee hastily to Lahore while abandoning his entire baggage train.

Following the Diwali festivities in November 1761, Jassa Singh directed the Dal Khalsa to launch a counterattack on Lahore. Abed Khan barricaded himself within the fort, while prominent local citizens sought an audience with Jassa Singh. These citizens proposed surrendering the city to the Sikhs in exchange for ensuring the inhabitants’ safety and security through Sikh occupation. The Sikhs accepted, secured the city, and then launched an assault on the fort.

Abed Khan was killed in the battle, and the Sikhs successfully captured the fort. In triumph, they declared Jassa Singh “Padshah” (Emperor) and minted commemorative coins bearing his name. However, Ganesh Das Vadehra disputed this achievement, claiming that Lahore’s Maulvis had minted the coins and sent them to Ahmad Shah Durrani in 1765. In contrast, Ghulam Ali Azad’s Khazana-e-Amira, written shortly after the coins were issued, corroborates the Sikhs’ version.

Ghulam Ali described the Sikhs’ rebellion, the killing of Abed Khan, and Jassa Singh’s proclamation as king: “They raised the standard of rebellion and disturbance, and killed his viceroy at Lahore. They raised a person named Jassa Singh from among themselves to the status of a king.” This account is supported by Siyar-u-Mutakhirin (1782), Tarikh-e-Muzaffari (1787), Khushwaqt Rae (1811), and Ahmad Yadgar (1835).

Ganesh Das’s account, written after Punjab’s annexation in 1849, is considered unreliable due to contemporary evidence. His claims contradict the accounts of multiple historians who lived closer to the events. Kartar Singh Tegh Khalsa confirms that Jassa Singh struck the coins, although some were sent to Ahmad Shah Durrani to provoke him.

=== The Sixth Abdali Incursion, 1762 ===
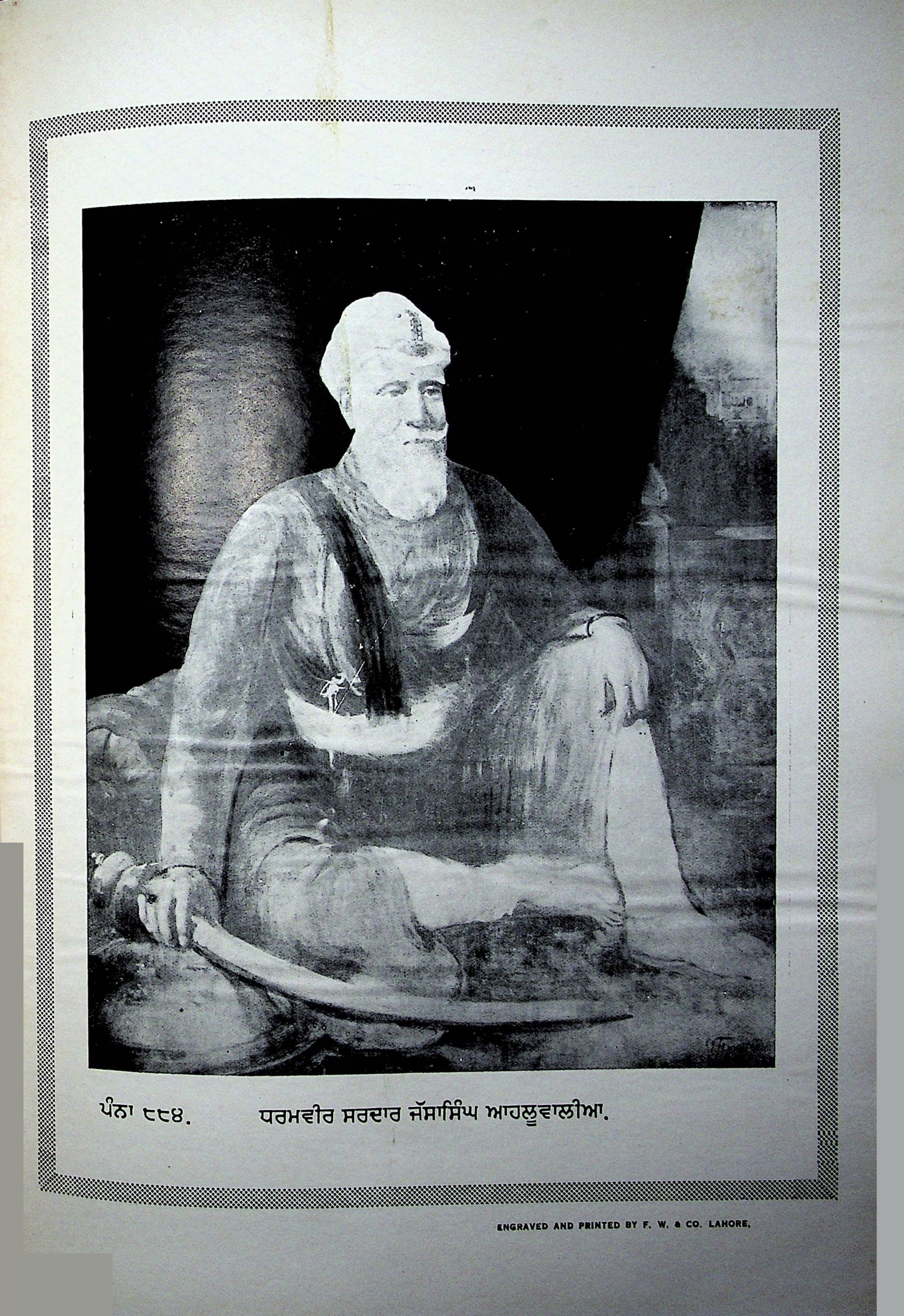
Print of a painting of Jassa Singh Ahluwalia, as published in the Mahan Kosh (1930)

In early 1762, Ahmad Shah Durrani invaded India to crush Sikhs power Ahmad Shah Durrani with his Soldiers reached Malerkotla, west of Sirhind, then attacked a 20,000 Sikh army escorting 40,000 women and children, along with the elderly. In one of their worst defeats—known as Vadda Ghalughara—the Sikhs lost perhaps 5–10,000+ soldiers and had 20,000 civilians massacred. The Afghan forces of Ahmad Shah Durrani came out victorious with the night ambush on the large convoy.

=== At Anandpur, March 1763 ===
In March 1763, Jassa Singh Ahluwalia, the renowned Sikh leader, joined forces with the Dal Khalsa at Anandpur to celebrate the festive occasion of Hola. However, the festivities were soon overshadowed by complaints from local Sikhs about the mistreatment they suffered at the hands of Gale Khan Rajput of Kathgarh and the zamindars of Shankargarh. Determined to protect his people, Jassa Singh embarked on an expedition against these oppressors, establishing Sikh military posts at Kathgarh and Balachaur to maintain order and discipline

This strategic move not only secured the region but also paved the way for Jassa Singh to collect tribute from neighbouring rulers, including the rajas of Bilaspur and Nalagarh, solidifying the Dal Khalsa's authority. As he returned to Fatahabad, Jassa Singh demonstrated his unwavering resolve by seizing Kot Isha Khan from Qadir Bakhsh, further expanding the Dal Khalsa's influence

=== Conquest of Jalandhar and Malerkotla ===
In June 1763, Jassa Singh Ahluwalia marched towards Jalandhar, Sadat Yar-Khan, the Governor of Jalandhar so much terrified he did not stir out of his capital, Jassa Singh sacked Jalandhar, In December 1763, Jassa Singh Ahluwalia defeated and Killed Bhikhan Khan, the Nawab of Malerkotla, and plundered Morinda.

=== Conquest of Sirhind ===
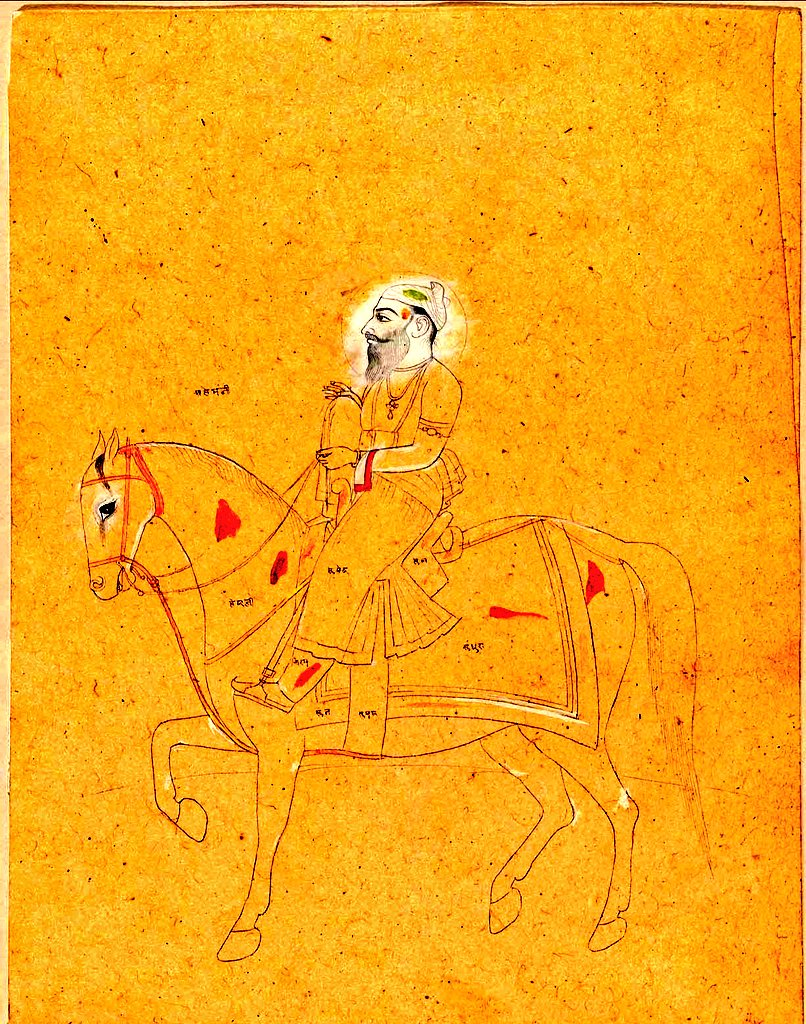
Gilded equestrian painting of Jassa Singh Ahluwalia, Punjab Plains, circa 1850

In January 1764, after sacking Morinda, the Sikhs, led by Jassa Singh Ahluwalia, launched an attack on Sirhind. As the head of the Dal Khalsa, he commanded seven misls, including six from the Budha Dal and the Bhangi misl from the Taruna Dal. Alha Singh of Patiala also joined the campaign, aiming to capture Sirhind. The battle took place near Ism, where Zain Khan was defeated and killed.

Following their victory, the province of Sirhind was divided among the seven misls and Phulkian states. Jassa Singh Ahluwalia took control of 24 villages in the Ludhiana district, retaining eight under his direct control. He allocated 12 villages to the Bundalia Sikhs of his misl and four villages to the Sikhs of Rurki.

=== At Naraingarh, January 1764 ===
After conquering Sarhind, Jassa Singh Ahluwalia marched to Naraingarh, 85 kilometres away, in January 1764. Bulaqi Mal, the Diwan of Raja Kirat Prakash of Nahan, presented Jassa Singh with a horse and Rs. 10,000 as a token of respect on behalf of his master, The regions of Bharog and Naraingarh, comprising 57 and 46 villages, respectively, were under the control of Muhammad Baqar, the Mir of Garhi Kotaha. Baqar offered Jassa Singh an elephant and a substantial sum of money. Rae Hoshiar Singh of Rani ka Raipur gifted him a horse and Rs. 1,000, while Gharib Das of Manimajra near Chandigarh paid him Rs. 25,000 as a nazrana

The Raja of Garhwal travelled from Srinagar to pay homage to Jassa Singh. Murar Singh, a jagirdar of Sultanwinds, served Jassa Singh, and his uncles, Dasaundha Singh and Hakumat Singh, were skilled horsemen. Jassa Singh appointed Hakumat Singh as his thanadar at Garhi Kotaha with 150 horsemen and 50 foot soldiers, Dasaundha Singh at Naraingarh, and Murar Singh at Bharog

Later, Jassa Singh married his elder daughter to Murar Singh and declared him his deputy, entrusting him with 1,500 horsemen and 500 foot soldiers to maintain order in the region. However, Dasaundha Singh's tyrannical rule led to opposition from the people, who sought help from the neighbouring Raja of Nahan. After Jassa Singh's death, Kanwar Kishan Singh seized Naraingarh, and Dasaundha Singh fled to Bharog,

Following Murar Singh's death, his son Jawahir Singh took control but was killed in battle, leaving his young son Mahan Singh. The administration was then handled by Rae Singh and Dasaundha Singh, who ruled cruelly and corruptly, causing widespread discontent

=== Sikh Invasion of Ganga-Yamuna 1764 ===
In February 1764, Jassa Singh Ahluwalia on hearing the ill treatment of the Hindus by Muslim led a strong body of the Dal Khalsa in to the upper Ganga Doab region, the Sikhs plundered several key cities, including Saharanpur, Shamli, Kandhla Ambli, Miranpur, Mandi Dabwali, Muzaffarnagar, Jawalapur, Kankhal, Landhaura, Najibabad, Nagina, Moradabad, Chandausi, Anupshahar, and Garhmukteshwar. These cities were under the control of Najib ad-Dawlah, the powerful dictator of Delhi from 1761 to 1770. In response to the Sikh raids, Najib ad-Dawlah mobilised his forces to punish the Sikhs. However, despite his efforts, the Sikhs employed guerrilla tactics, evading direct confrontation and continuing to harass the enemy.

Tahmas Khan Miskin, a contemporary historian who fought alongside Najib ad-Dawlah, described the Sikhs' unorthodox methods: "In that year, 40,000 of their horsemen crossed the Yamuna and disturbed and looted the Saharanpur and Meerut districts. Nawab Najib Khan, for a month or two, moved in every direction where the Sikhs were reported to be roving, in order to protect the country, and fought and usually defeated them. As they did not make a firm stand anywhere to offer battle, he had to run back after them, but they did not give up their jackal tricks.", Eventually, Najib-ud-daulah recognised the futility of continued conflict and opted for a diplomatic solution. He offered the Sikhs a substantial bribe of eleven lakhs of rupees, effectively ending the hostilities.

The riches collected from Ganga Doab and Rohilkhand were immense, and Jassa Singh allocated one-tenth of the booty to rebuild Amritsar, which had been destroyed by Ahmad Shah Durrani. This reconstruction project held great significance for the Sikh community. Jassa Singh entrusted the task to Sahib Rae Chaudhri and later Bhai Des Raj, overseeing the project himself for four years until its completion at a cost of 14 lakhs. He had previously demonstrated his commitment to Amritsar by building residential quarters, known as Katra Ahluwalian, in 1759.

=== Ahmad Shah Durrani Seventh Invasion ===
In 1765, Ahmad Shah Durrani invaded India for seventh time in the winter of 1764–1765, During this campaign he constantly harassed by Sikhs, Qazi Nur Muhammad who was present in the Afghan army describes the numbers of engagements between Sikhs and Afghans, a battle was fought on the western bank of the Satluj opposite Rupar, it was morning and the Afghan army was hardly gone 3 km from the western bank of the Satluj, when they attacked by the Sikhs, The Afghans immediately stopped marching and got into regular formation of battle, Ahmad Shah Durrani was in the center with 6,000 choice soldiers, Shah Vali Khan, Jahan Khan, Shah Pasand Khan, Anzala Khan and others at the head of 12,000 troops were on the right Nasir Khan with 12,000 Baluchis was on the left, The Dal Khalsa also organised themselves in regular battle army Jassa Singh Ahluwalia fearlessly stood like a mountain in the center close by him was Jassa Singh Thokah, looking like a lion in stature,Charat Singh, Jhanda Singh, Lahna Singh and Jai Singh positioned themselves on the right, and Hari Singh Bhangi, Ram Das, Gulab Singh and Gujar Singh positioned on the left.

furious battle took place with the Sikhs overpowering the right wing of the Durrani army after applying their usual tactic where Hari Singh dashed upon Shah Vali Khan and Jahan Khan and then retired to draw the Afghans to pursue them, where the Sikhs would then return and ambush the Afghans. Ahmad Shah who was quite aware of the usual tactics of the Sikhs of hit and retiring and then returning to attack again, called and warned Nasir Khan about this stratagem of the Sikhs. But despite the warning, Nasir Khan and his soldiers rushed in pursue only for another contingent of Sikh soldiers to rush to position themselves in between, cutting off both Ahmad Shah and Nasir Khan and then circling the retreating Baluchis army where a close bloody combat took place. The whole battle ended due to nightfall with both parties retiring.

Next morning, with sunrise, the Afghans moved onward but right after 5 km, they again came across the Sikhs who attacked the Durranis from all sides. The formation of the Sikhs was reversed whereas Ahmad Shah applied same formation as previous day. Ahmad Shah told Nasir Khan and the whole army to not move a step without his order as he was aware of tactics of the Sikhs, and after waiting for some time, Ahmad Shah ordered an assault but the Sikhs resorted back to their tactics and retired, only for Afghans to pursue them for next 3 miles when the Sikhs returned, circled them and attacked them from all sides after scattering themselves. Upset Ahmad Shah shouted at Nasir Khan to stick to his spot and attack the Sikhs only when they come closer to him and he advised all the remaining soldiers the same. Again with the nightfall, the battle came to a close. Throughout the march through the Jullundur Doab from the bank of Sutlej to river Chenab, the Durranis were harassed and assaulted for seven days where the Sikhs returned again and again only to retire in same prevalence, as this was their war tactic

=== In the last Ahmad Shah Durrani Invasion, 1766-67 ===
In the winter of 1766, Ahmad Shah Durrani launched his final invasion of the Punjab. However, his campaign was marked by relentless harassment from the Sikhs, who refused to yield. Desperate to end the conflict, Ahmad Shah Durrani wrote letters to Jassa Singh Ahluwalia and other prominent Sikh sardars, urging them to meet with him and negotiate a peace treaty. But the Sikhs remained resolute, rejecting his overtures

Undeterred, the Sikhs continued to employ guerrilla tactics, weakening Durrani's forces. Frustrated and defeated, Ahmad Shah Durrani retreated from the Punjab, ending his campaign at Ismailabad, 32 kilometres south of Ambala. This final invasion marked the decline of Durrani's empire and the rise of Sikh power in the region

=== Jassa Singh Ahluwalia's Campaigns in the Hill States ===
After Adina Beg, the viceroy of Punjab, died in September 1758, the hill states that were tributary to him, including Kangra hills and Jammu, were left without a leader. Ahmad Shah Durrani seized this opportunity and appointed Raja Ghamand Chand of Kangra as governor of the Jalandhar Doab and the hill country between the Ravi and Satluj rivers in October 1759, However, Jassa Singh Ahluwalia defeated Ghamand Chand in the battle of Mahilpur near Hoshiarpur and forced him to pay tribute to the Dal Khalsa. Jassa Singh then sent a small contingent into the hills and collected nominal tribute from Kangra states, including Mandi and Kullu. By March 1763, Bilaspur and Nalagarh had also become tributary to the Dal Khalsa.

Raja Ranjit Dev of Jammu, who was a tributary to Ahmad Shah Durrani, paid his tribute to the Durrani when he returned to Afghanistan in 1765. However, this action was deeply resented by the Sikhs, who had gained the upper hand in the region. In response, Jassa Singh Ahluwalia led a section of the Dal Khalsa to march upon Jammu and imposed a fine of three lakhs and seventy-five thousand rupees on Ranjit Dev, making him tributary to the Dal Khalsa instead.

=== Enmity with Jassa Singh Ramgarhia ===
After Hari Singh's death in 1765, Jassa Singh Ramgarhia took over as the leader of the Taruna Dal. Despite their cooperation against Ahmad Shah Durrani, the two chiefs were often at odds with each other

In 1775, tensions escalated when Jassa Singh Ahluwalia was travelling to Achal near Batala to attend a fair. Mali Singh Ramgarhia, Jassa Singh Ramgarhia's brother, was leading a contingent from Sri Hargobindpur to Batala. The two groups clashed, and Jassa Singh Ahluwalia was shot and fell off his horse. Mali Singh put him in a litter and carried him to Batala, their headquarters. Jassa Singh Ramgarhia sincerely Apologised. During his two-day stay in Batala, Jassa Singh Ahluwalia remained withdrawn and uncommunicative. He refused food and drink.

On the third day, Jassa Singh Ramgarhia, eager to make amends, sent Jassa Singh Ahluwalia to Fatehabad with full honours and a proper escort. To achieve this, Jassa Singh Ahluwalia besieged the Ramgarhia town of Zahura, located on the banks of the River Beas. During the battle, Jassa Singh Ramgarhia was wounded and forced to retreat. The town eventually fell to the Ahluwalias

Jassa Singh Ahluwalia then gifted Zahura to Baghel Singh to secure his alliance. He formed a confederacy with the Jai Singh Kanhaiya and Mahan Singh, ultimately defeating Jassa Singh Ramgarhia and expelling him from Punjab in 1778.

=== Occupation of Kapurthala, 1779 ===
In December 1779, Jassa Singh embarked on a decisive campaign to assert his authority over Kapurthala. This strategic region, nestled along the left bank of the River Beas, had been under the control of Rae Ibrahim Bhatti. Rae Ibrahim's failure to pay the annual tribute of one lakh rupees, which had been overdue for some time, sparked Jassa Singh's action. Furthermore, Ibrahim's construction of 13 forts around the town, including the strategically located Rae-ka-kot near Afghan colonies, raised concerns about his growing power.

Jassa Singh had previously demonstrated his military prowess by capturing Rae-ka-kot in 1770 with the help of Murar Singh and Shaikh Karimulilah. He then appointed Chait Singh as the thanadar of the region. However, tensions escalated in 1777 when Jassa Singh's son-in-law, Mohar Singh, was killed by a gunshot from one of the forts near Kapurthala. Despite Ibrahim's apologies and claims of innocence, Jassa Singh demanded justice and eventually decided to take over Kapurthala.

Upon arriving at Kapurthala, Jassa Singh's forces clashed with Rae Ibrahim's, and the Bhatti chief retreated to the main fort. Jassa Singh set up camp at Shaikhpur village, while his cousin, Kanwar Bhag Singh, successfully captured several surrounding villages. These villages included: Andresa, Dialpur, Bholath, Bhoian, Bohal, Brahmwal, Chakoke, Dainwind, Dala, Dhaliwal, Dhilwan, Hamira, Karael, Khakhrain, Kularan, Lakhanki, Lohian, Mullanwal, Nadali, Parveznagar, Ramidi, Sidhwan, and Wadalli. Rae Ibrahim soon realised the futility of resistance and sued for peace. He sent a horse as a gift and dispatched his officials, Diwan Lahori Mal and Bora Mal, to negotiate terms.

Jassa Singh agreed to let Rae Ibrahim leave safely with his family and belongings. He also provided him with a place to live and a fixed allowance, demonstrating his magnanimity. In the end, Kapurthala became the headquarters of Kanwar Bhag Singh and the capital of the Ahluwalia misl. Jassa Singh continued to reside at Fatehabad, solidifying his leadership and the Ahluwalia misl's dominance in the region.

=== Battle of Delhi ===
In March 1783, Dal Khalsa under Jassa Singh Ahluwalia and Baghel Singh was advancing upon Delhi, Jassa Singh Ramgarhia Joined Dal Khalsa at 10 March 1783, and on 11 March, Dal Khalsa entered in the royal palaces in the red fort. In the Diwan-e-Am Jassa Singh Ahluwalia was placed on the throne of Delhi as Badshah Singh of Delhi by Sikhs, Through Ramgarhia was in minority, yet he challenged the Ahluwalia and called upon him to get down immediately. Both sides drew out swords and were about to pounce upon each other when Jassa Singh Ahluwalia at once renounced the honour Mughals agreed to construct 7 Sikh Gurudwaras in Delhi for Sikh Gurus.

== Death and legacy ==
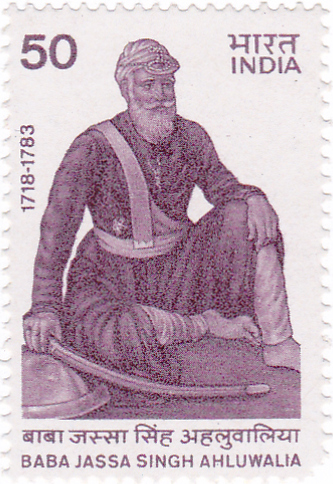
A commemorative postage stamp of him, 1985

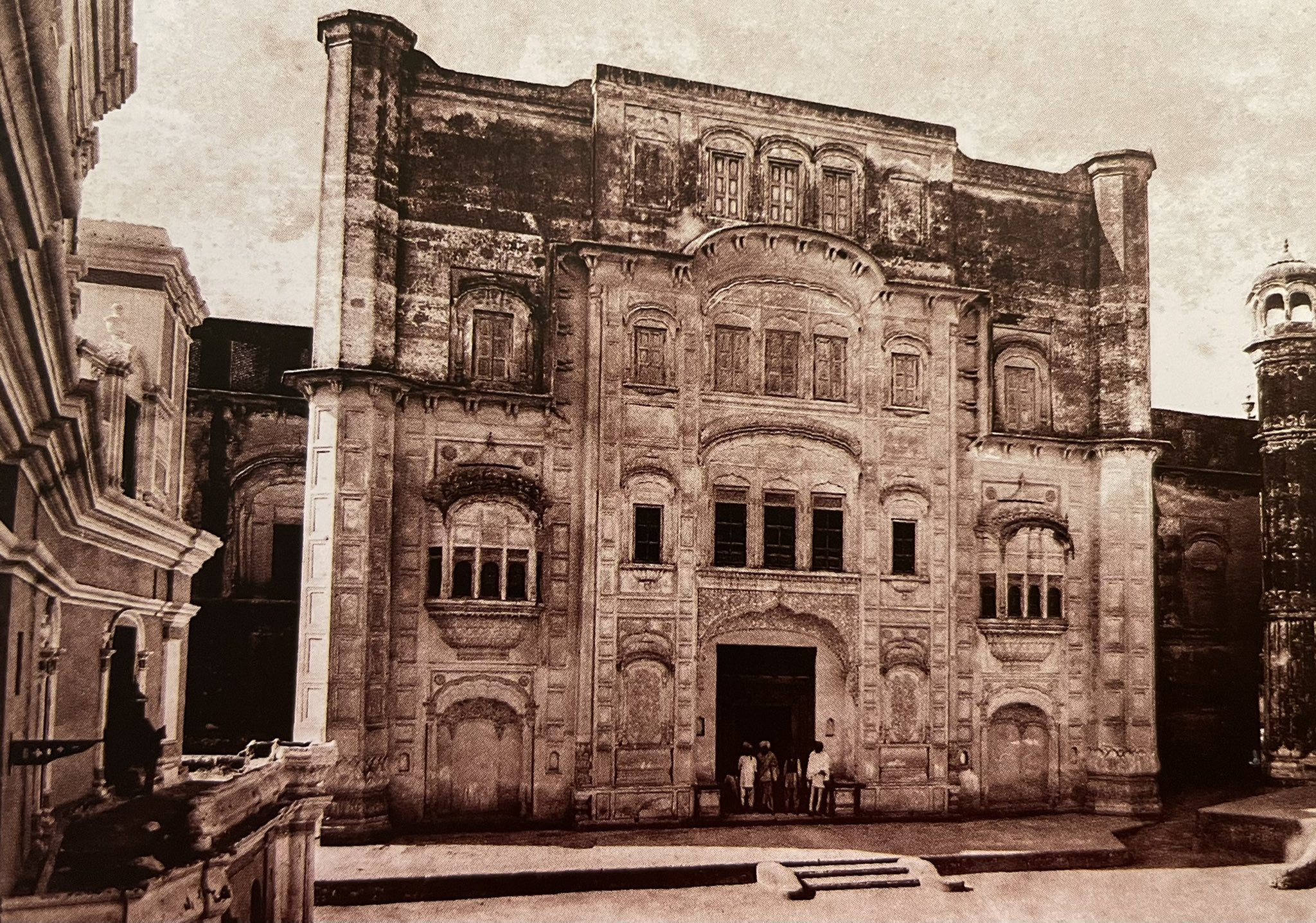
Photo of Jassa Singh Ahluwalia's haveli, circa early 20th century

Jassa Singh Ahluwalia died on 23 October 1783 in Amritsar.

He (Jassa Singh Ahluwalia) had the great privilege of conquering Lahore and issuing his own coin ... [and] sitting on the throne of the Mughal Emperors in the Red Fort at Delhi [after conquering it]. He fought a number of times face to face with Ahmad Shah Durrani, the greatest Asian general of his days. The invader tried to win him over in vain. The Maharajas of Patiala and Jind stood before him in all reverence and humility. The Rajas of Nalagarh, Bilaspur, Kangra Hills and Jammu touched his knees. The Nawabs of Malerkotla and Kunjpura paid him homage. And yet he remained a humble and docile disciple of Guru Gobind Singh. In the person of Jassa Singh Ahluwalia, the Guru actually made a sparrow kill hawks.

— Hari Ram Gupta (Note: Rest of the quote: "Jassa Singh was a great warrior, mighty general and eminent organiser. He bore thirty-two scars of sword cuts and bullet marks on the front part of his body and none on his back. He was a giant in body. ... Qazi Nur Muhammad who saw him fighting against Ahmad Shah Durrani called him a mountain. He was a great warrior, mighty general and eminent organiser. He bore thirty-two scars of sword cuts and bullet marks on the front of his body and none on his back. He was a giant in body. His breakfast consisted of one kilogram of flour, one half kilogram of butter, one quarter kilogram of crystalline sugar slabs (misri), and one bucketful of butter-milk (lassi). One he-goat sufficed him for two meals…. These were the days of physical prowess, and only men possessed of indomitable will power could compete with ferocious Afghans on better footing. He was wheatish in colour, tall, fat, with a broad forehead, wide chest, loud and sonorous voice which could be clearly heard by an assemblage of 50,000 men….. The horses under him must have been the size of an elephant. This is why he could be clearly seen by Qazi Nur Muhammad in a body of fifty or sixty thousand men. His long arms came down to his knees. This enabled him to strike his sword right and left with equal valour.")

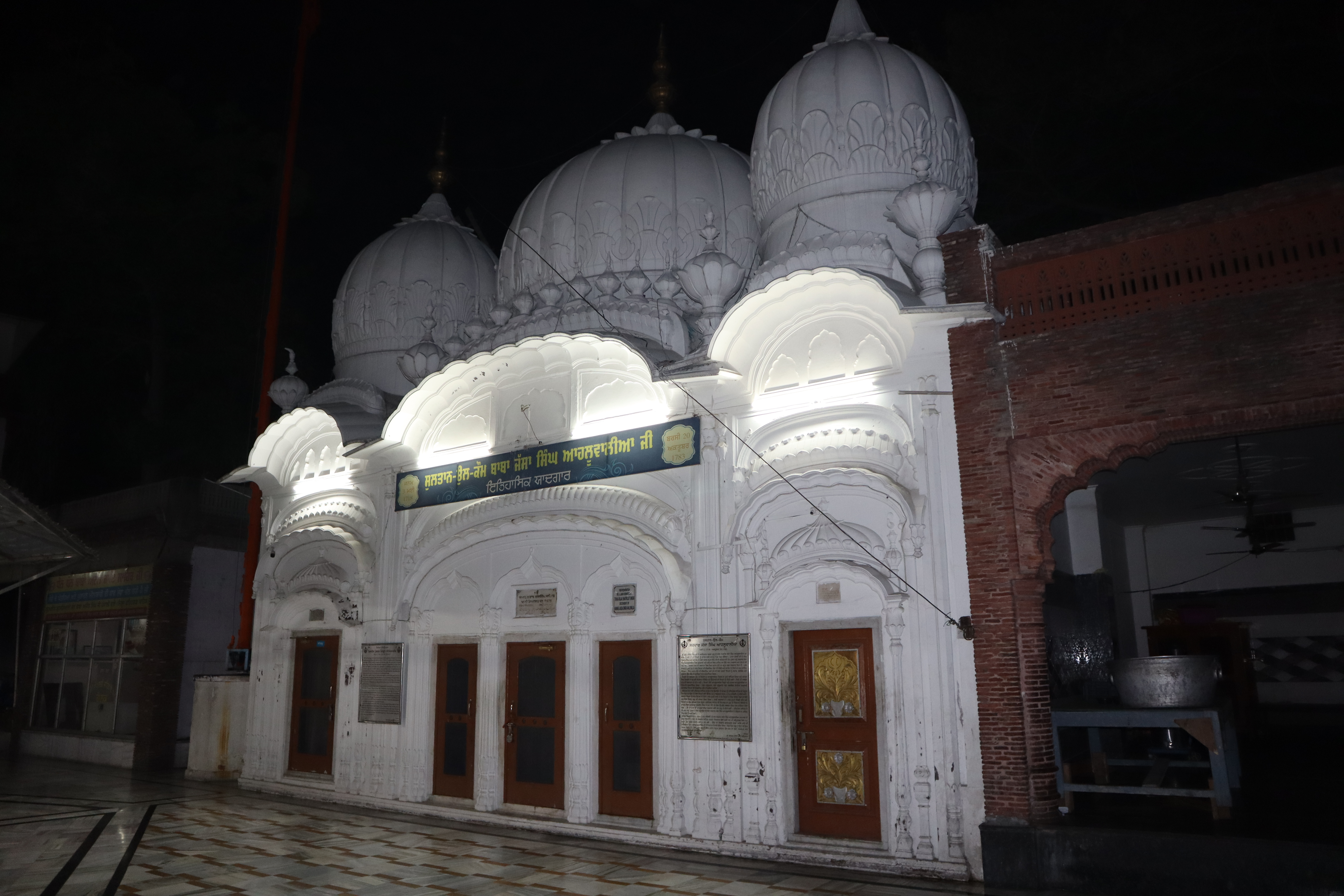
Photograph of the Samadhi of Jassa Singh Ahluwalia within the Golden Temple complex, Amritsar, Punjab, India, April 2023

Nawab Jassa Singh Ahluwalia Government College (NJSA Government College) in Kapurthala, established in 1856 by Raja Randhir Singh of Kaputhala is named after him. A commemorative postage stamp on Jassa Singh Ahluwalia was issued by Government of India on 4 April 1985.

== Rescue of Maratha women ==
The surviving accounts of Jassa Singh rescuing Hindu women captured by Ahmad Shah Durrani appears exclusively in 19th-century texts—Munshi Kanhaiyya Lal's Tareekh-e-Punjab and Gian Singh's Shamsher Khalsa—written more than a century after the Third Battle of Panipat in 1761. This temporal gap and source limitation raises significant historiographical concerns about the narrative's reliability.

== In popular culture ==
=== Television ===
- In the 2010 historical TV series Maharaja Ranjit Singh telecasted on DD National, the character of Jassa Singh Ahluwalia is portrayed by Shahbaz Khan.

== See also ==
- Dal Khalsa
- Sikh warriors
  - Banda Bahadur
  - Baba Deep Singh
  - Nawab Kapur Singh
- Decline of the Mughal Empire
  - Battle of Fatehpur Sikri
  - Sikh attacks on Delhi
  - Maratha capture of Mughals
  - Maratha conquest of North-west India
