= Jhanda Singh Bhangi =

Chief of Bhangi Misl from 1766 to 1774

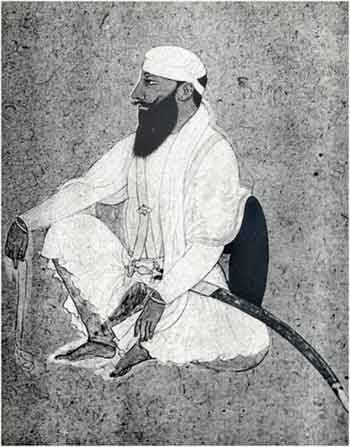

Chief of Bhangi Misl
- Reign: 1766–1774
- Successor: Ganda Singh Bhangi
- Died: 1774
- Father: Hari Singh Bhangi

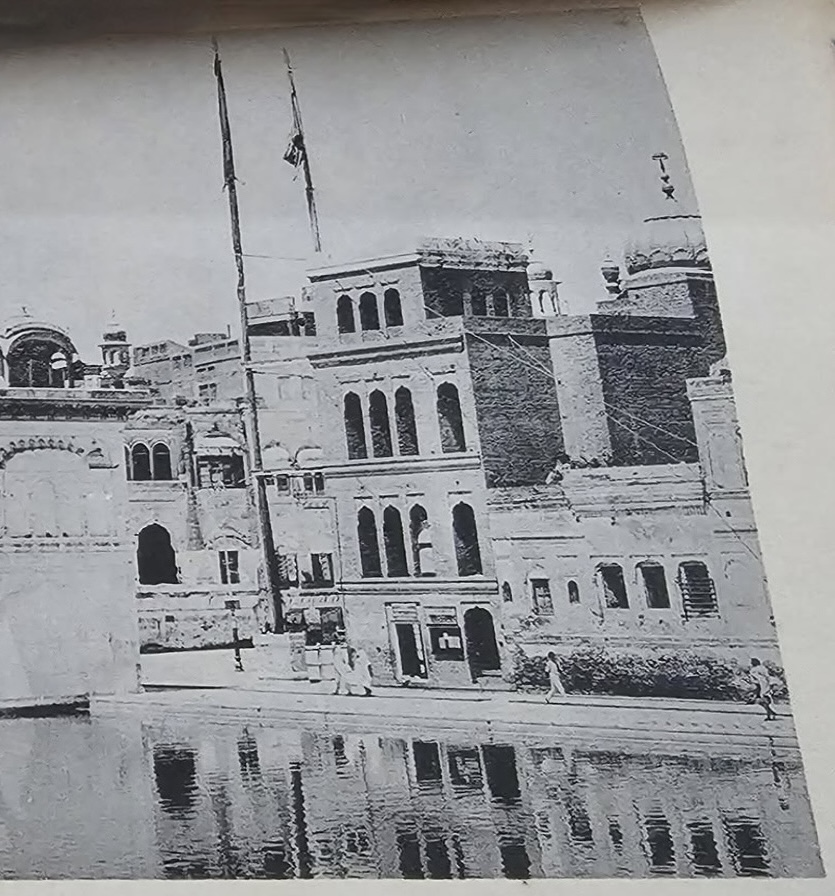
The Jhanda Bunga of Amritsar, built by Jhanda Singh of the Bhangi Misl, now demolished.

Jhanda Singh Bhangi (died 1774) was a chief of Bhangi Misl. Under his leadership the Dhillon family became the dominant de facto ruling power of Punjab. His father was Hari Singh, one of the most powerful Sikh warriors of the time. He also had a warrior brother Ganda Singh. Jhanda Singh appointed his younger brother Ganda Singh as the commander in chief of the forces. Jassa Singh Ramgarhia was one of the closest friends of Jhanda Singh.

== Early life ==
Jhanda Singh was the eldest son of Hari Singh. After his father's death, he succeeded him.

== Military campaigns ==
In 1766, soon after taking power, Jhanda Singh and Ganda Singh led a large army towards Multan. They stopped at the right bank of the Sutlej River, across from Bahawalpur. Mubarik Khan, ruler of Bahawalpur, came to stop them. Shuja Khan, the governor of Multan, joined Mubarik Khan in the fight. A tough battle took place between the Sikhs and the Muslims, but neither side won. They agreed to divide the land between Bahawalpur and Lahore. A treaty was signed, and Pakpattan was decided as the boundary between the two groups.

=== Ahmad Shah Durrani's Eighth Invasion of India and the Sikh Resistance (1766–1767) ===
In December 1766, Ahmad Shah Durrani launched his eighth invasion of India, but the Sikhs were ready for him. Led by Jhanda Singh, Jassa Singh Ahluwalia, and Khushal Singh, they employed guerrilla tactics to constantly harass Durrani's forces. Undeterred, Durrani attempted to negotiate, sending letters to the three Sikh leaders on 15 January 1767, inviting them to either meet with him or face him on the battlefield. However, the Sikhs rejected his offer and continued their relentless attacks. By May 1767, Durrani had had enough and retreated from Punjab. Seizing the opportunity, Jhanda Singh remained in Amritsar, completing the fort initially built by Hari Singh. He also laid out the city's infrastructure, further solidifying the Sikhs' control over the region.

=== Kasur, 1771 ===
In 1771, A group of Brahmans from Kasur came to Amritsar and reported that Hindus were being mistreated and subjected to sexual violence by the Pathans of Kasur. They also mentioned that cows were being publicly slaughtered in different parts of the town. They asked for help in resolving these issues. The military post that had been set up by Hari Singh in Kot Khwajah Husain in Kasur had been removed. Jassa Singh Ahluwalia, Jhanda Singh, and Ganda Singh quickly decided to attack Kasur to punish the wrongdoers. They left Amritsar and stopped at Tarn Taran, then continued to Khem Karan, where they stayed for two days. There, many other Sikhs joined them, drawn by the possibility of gaining a large amount of loot. They then moved toward Kasur. The two Afghan leaders, Hamid Khan and Usman Khan, came out to fight. Despite the tough resistance from the defenders, the Sikhs managed to break into the town. A close battle took place in the streets. The invaders destroyed Garhi Adur Rahim Khan and seized a lot of loot. Fighting continued in other forts for a few more days. Eventually, the Afghan leaders realized they couldn't win and asked for peace. They agreed not to kill cows, not to mistreat their Hindu subjects, and to pay a tribute along with a fine of four lakhs of rupees. The Sikhs accepted these terms. The military post in Kot Khwajah Husain was reinstated, and the Afghan rulers were honored with robes. The Sikhs then left Kasur.

=== Jhanda Singh's 1771 Bahawalpur Campaign ===
In 1771, Jhanda Singh focused his attention on Bahawalpur, sending Commander Majha Singh to attack the area. Majha Singh successfully pillaged Khai, Sadullahpur, and neighboring regions under Bahawalpur's control. In response, the Nawab of Bahawalpur deployed his nephew, Jafar Khan, to lead a select force against Majha Singh across the Sutlej River. The ensuing battle was fierce, with several of the Nawab's officers killed. However, the tide turned in their favor with the timely arrival of reinforcements from Bahawalpur. Despite Majha Singh suffering a fatal bullet wound, his soldiers remained steadfast and prepared to continue fighting. Ultimately, the Nawab of Bahawalpur opted to purchase peace by paying a substantial sum of one lakh rupees, as reported by Gian Singh. Following this, the Sikh forces advanced towards Multan.

=== Multan, 1772 ===
In 1772, during Ahmad Shah's reign, Timur Shah appointed Haji Sharif Khan as the governor of Multan. Shuja Khan, the previous governor, retired to his town, Shujabad. Haji Sharif Khan was ineffective, and the crops failed, leading to the saying: "Haji Sharif, na Rabi, na Kharif," referring to the failed crops. Furthermore, Haji Sharif Khan's indolence caused law and order to deteriorate, and he faced opposition from Shuja Khan and others. Dharam Das was murdered by Haji Sharif Khan's orders, which led to unrest. Timur Shah eventually replaced Haji Sharif Khan with Sharif Beg Taklu. However, Shuja Khan, with the support of Jafar Khan, Nawab of Bahawalpur, besieged Multan. Sharif Beg sought help from Jhanda Singh and Ganda Singh, the Bhangi sardars. After 18 days, the Bahawalpur forces were defeated, and the Sikhs took control of the city on 25 December 1772. Jhanda Singh appointed his stepbrother, Diwan Singh Chachowalia, as the governor of Multan.

=== Jhanda Singh's western Punjab campaign ===
In December 1772, after the capture of Multan, Ganda Singh passed through Bahawalpur, securing a tribute of one lakh rupees. Meanwhile, Jhanda Singh turned his attention to western Punjab, beginning with the conquest of Tulamba, Jhanda Singh then subdued the influential Baluch chiefs of the Jhang district, who controlled the Chenab River, and expanded further by bringing Mankera under his control, securing its submission through tribute. He also secured the Nawab of Ahmadabad's submission, located across the Jhelum River from Bhera, who paid twenty thousand rupees in tribute. Both Mankera and Ahmadabad were entrusted to Man Singh. Jhanda Singh continued to expand his territory, taking control of the land between the Salt Range and the Chenab River, stretching from Sahiwal to Shahpur.

However, local tradition challenges the claim that the Sikhs occupied Mankera before Ranjit Singh's eventual conquest, suggesting that Jhanda Singh may have made the chief of Mankera a tributary while allowing him a degree of autonomy. Jhanda Singh then crossed the Indus River at Kalabagh, capturing the area and raiding parts of Dera Ismail Khan. On his return journey, he captured Pindi Bhattian and Dhara, before targeting the stronghold of the Chatha Pathans at Rasulnagar, located along the Sialkot-Multan road. During this campaign, he seized the famous Zamzama gun and transported it to Amritsar, where it became known as the Bhangianwali Top. In 1773, Jhanda Singh, along with Ganda Singh, launched an expedition against Sialkot, capturing most of the district from the Pathans. They then turned their attention to Jammu, where Ranjit Dev recognized their suzerainty and agreed to tribute arrangements.

== Death ==
In 1774, a serious conflict erupted between Ranjit Dev, the ruler of Jammu, and his eldest son, Brij Raj Dev, due to the son's bad character, while Ranjit Dev, a wise leader, wanted his younger son, Dalel Singh, to succeed him. The dispute led to war, with Brij Raj seeking help from Charat Singh and Jai Singh Kanhaiya, who both agreed to join him. Ranjit Dev, unable to face this alliance alone, called on his overlord, Jhanda Singh, for support. The two sides clashed for twenty-three days at Udhochak, during which Charat Singh was killed by an accidental gun explosion. Shocked by the loss, Jai Singh Kanhiya placed Charat Singh's son on the throne and, unable to continue alone, bribed Jhanda Singh's bodyguard to assassinate him. Jhanda Singh was killed in the dark during a trip, and his brother, Ganda Singh, devastated by the loss, withdrew from the fight. Realizing Jai Singh's power, Ranjit Dev made peace with his son and Jai Singh Kanhiya, offering him a large sum of Rs. 1,25,000.

== See also ==
- Sikh Confederacy
- Misl

Preceded by Hari Singh Bhangi	Fourth Leader of Bhangi Misl; 1766–1774	Succeeded by Ganda Singh Bhangi
