= Bhangi Misl =

Sovereign state of the Sikh Confederacy (1748-1810)

Bhangi Misl Bhangi Misal
- 1748–1810
- Capital: Amritsar
- Common language: Punjabi
- Religion: Sikhism (rulers); Islam (majority); Hinduism
- Notable Sardar's
  - 1739–1746: Bhuma Singh
  - 1746–1765: Hari Singh
  - 1765–1774: Jhanda Singh
  - 1774–1775: Ganda Singh
  - 1782–1800: Gulab Singh
- Historical era: Early modern period
  - Split from Singhpuria Misl: 1748
  - Annexed by the Sikh Empire: 1810
Preceded by	Succeeded by
Mughal Empire; Singhpuria Misl	Sikh Empire
- Today part of: Pakistan, India

The Bhangi Misl (Punjabi pronunciation: [pə̃˨ŋɡiː mɪsəl]) was a large and powerful Sikh Misl headquartered in Amritsar. It was founded in the early 18th century by Sardar Chhajja Singh, who was baptised into the Khalsa tradition by Banda Singh Bahadur. It was a first misl to established a Khalsa Raj and publish Khalsa currency coins. The Bhangi Kingdom/Misl was founded by Dhillon Jats.

== Etymology ==
The misl received its name "Bhangi" because Chhajja Singh and his soldiers frequently used the herbal intoxicant bhang (drink made from cannabis sativa). Bhang (hemp) was a wild-growth plant found in the jungles of Punjab and along river-banks. An intoxicant can be produced by pounding the plant in a mortar and sifting it.

== History ==
=== Expanse of Bhangi Misl ===
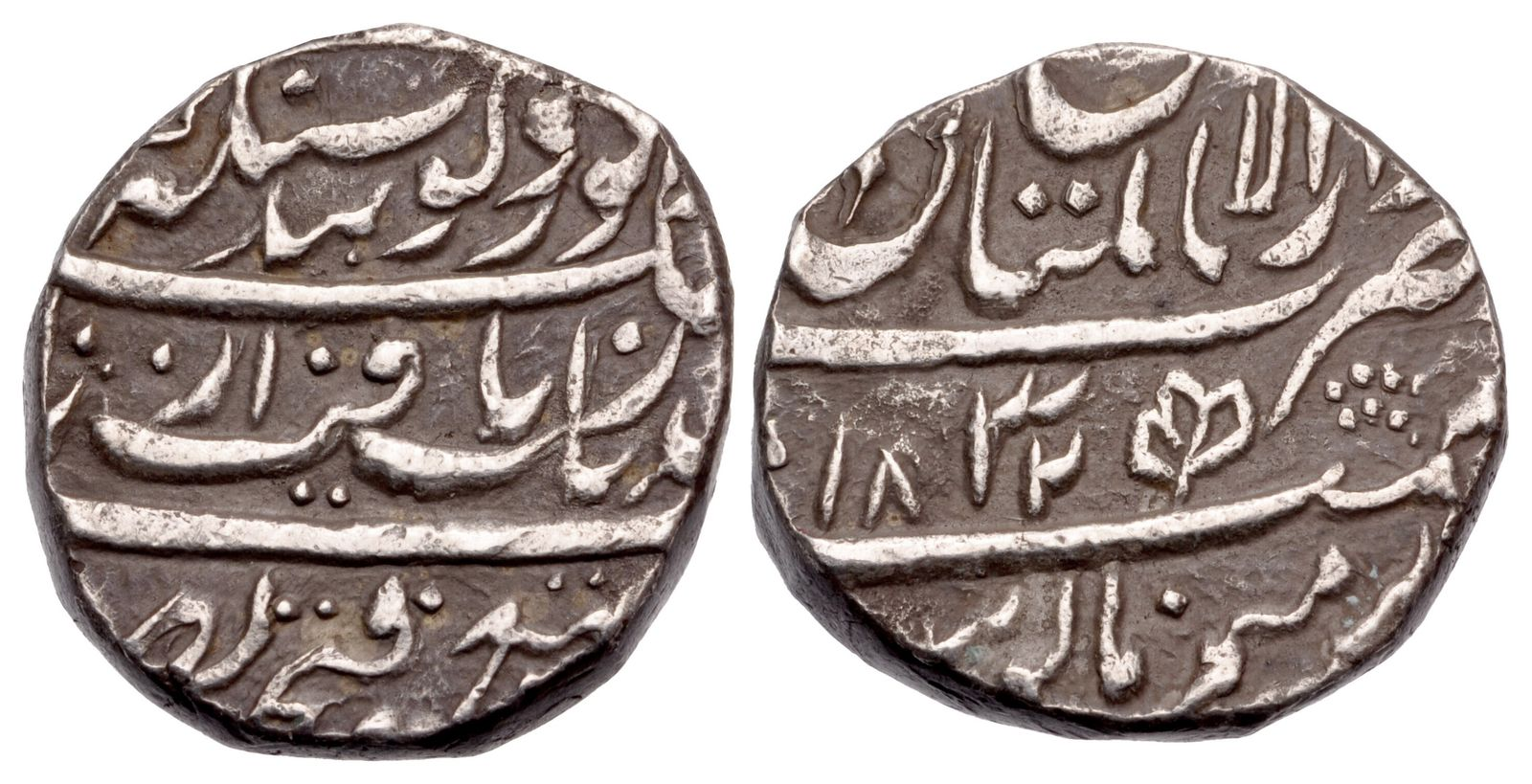
Coin minted under Desa Singh Bhangi, VS 1833-1839, AD 1776-1782. AR Rupee (20mm, 11.55 g, 2h). Multan mint. Dated VS 1832 (AD 1775)

The misl was founded by Jats. It grew in strength and territory to cover an area from Gujrat to Multan and emerged as the strongest power in the western Punjab region. The Misl went north into Jammu until Poonch, west to the Indus River, south to the Multan, and east to central modern day Punjab, India. In 1761, the Bhangi chief Hari Singh captured Kasur and nearby areas of Ferozepore. However, deaths among the leadership during the late 1760s reduced the Misl's power. On 16 April 1765, the Bhangi sardars Gujjar Singh and Lehna Singh Kahlon, allied with Sobha Singh of the Kanhaiya Misl, conquered Lahore. They did not plunder the city as it was the birthplace of Guru Ram Das, the fourth Sikh guru.

=== Decline of power ===
The Bhangi misl engaged in numerous power struggles with the Sukerchakia Misl until they were severely weakened at the Siege of Lahore and the loss of Lahore to Ranjit Singh in 1799.

In 1810, Maharaja Ranjit Singh sent a force to Gujrat to annex the Bhangi Misl. Its chief, Sahib Singh, did not resist Ranjit Singh's forces and thus the misl was annexed by the Sikh Empire. Due to the pleading of the mother of Sahib Singh, Mai Lachhmi, Ranjit Singh bestowed him with a jagir worth 100,000 rupees, however Sahib Singh died in 1811. Sahib Singh's two widows, Daya Kaur and Rattan Kaur, were wedded to Ranjit Singh via chador dalna.

== Zamzama cannon ==
Bhangi Misl held the possession of Zamzama, the famous cannon, which was at the time named Bhangi Toap, Bhangianwala Toap and Bhangian di Top, names it retains to this day.

== List of sardars (chiefs) ==
The list of the chiefs of the Bhangi Misl are as follows:

1. Chhajja Singh Bhangi
2. Bhima (Bhuma) Singh
3. Hari Singh
4. Jhanda Singh
5. Ganda Singh
6. Charhat Singh (died nearly immediately)
7. Desu Singh (Note: His name is alternatively spelt as 'Desa Singh Bhangi'.)
8. Gulab Singh
9. Gurdit Singh
10. Sahib Singh (? – 1810)

== Territory ==
The misl originated from Panjwar near Amritsar. The Bhangis held the Upper Rechna Doab, Upper Chajj Doab, and territory around Lahore and Amritsar. The Bhangi Misl controlled much of western Punjab between Multan and the Hill States, including the settlements of Lahore, Amritsar, Gujrat, and Sialkot.

== Gallery ==
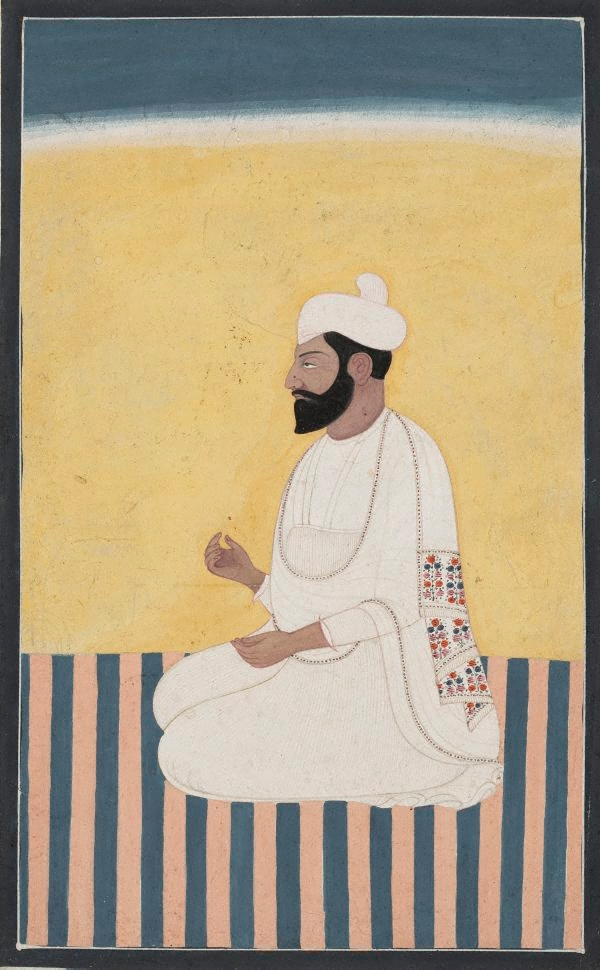
Miniature painting of Gujjar Singh Banghi, circa late 18th century

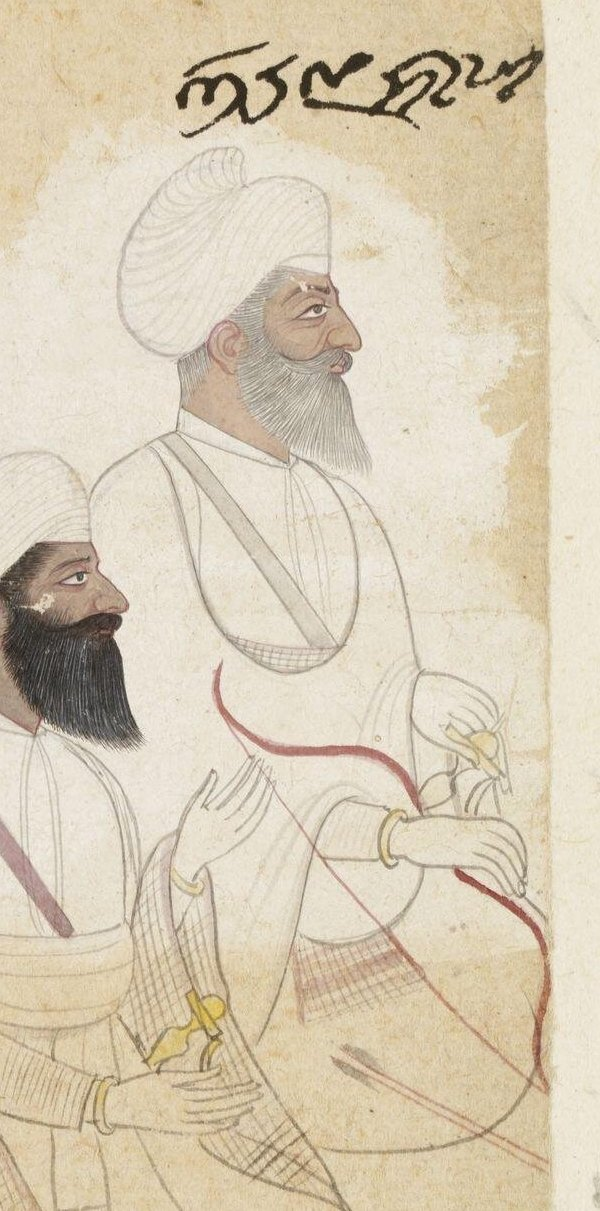
Detail of Lehna Singh Kahlon of the Bhangi Misl from a painting three seated Sikh sardars, circa late 18th century. He was one of the triumvirate rulers of Lahore in the mid-to-late-18th century

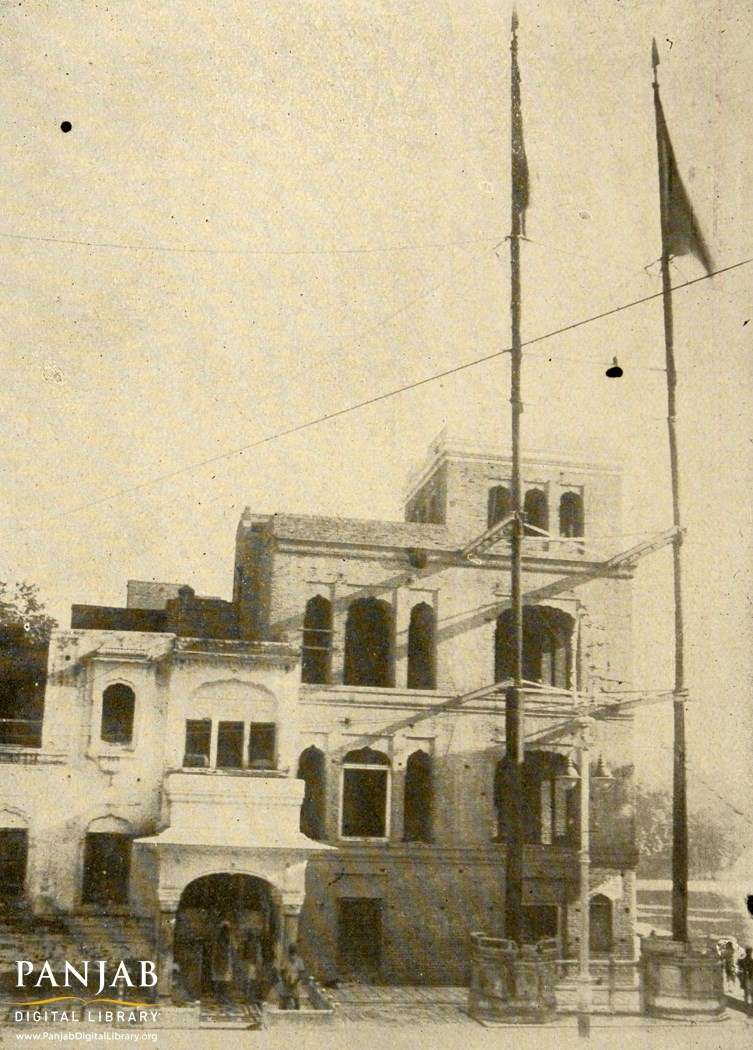
Jhanda Bunga of Amritsar in the 1920's. A building constructed by the Bhangi Misl, now demolished.

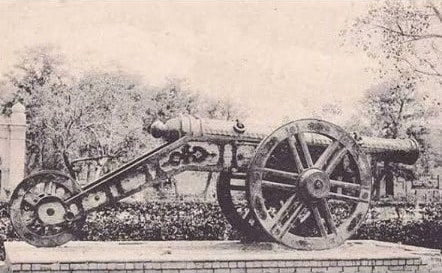
Photograph of the Zamzama cannon or Bhangi Toap

== See also ==
- Sikh Confederacy
- Dhillon
- Bhang
- Cannabis and Sikhism
