= List of rulers of Lahore =

The recorded history of the rulers of Lahore (Punjabi: لہور دے حُکمران, Urdu: حکمرانِ لاہور), covers thousands of years.

== Hindu Shahis (850–1026) ==
The first documentation of Lahore is recorded as early as 982 CE (in the book Hudud al-'Alam) taking place during the rule of the Hindu Shahis. Lahore was made the capital of the Hindu Shahi Kingdom in the year 1001.

- Jayapala (964 – 1001)
- Anandapala (1001 – 1010)
- Trilochanapala (1010 – 1021)

== Ghaznavids (977–1186) ==
Lahore came under Ghaznavid control in 1021, with Malik Ayaz as its first Muslim governor.

- Malik Ayaz (1021 – 1041)
- Abu Nasr Parsi (? – before 1115)
- Khusrau Malik (1163–1186)

== Delhi Sultanate (1186–1524) ==
- Qutb ud-Din Aibak (1204 – 1210)
- Nasir ad-Din Qabacha (intermittently; 1210 – 1217)
- Jalal al-Din Mangburni (1223 – 1227)
- Izzuddin Kabir Khan Ayaz (1228 – 1240)
- Muhammad bin Balban (1269 – 1285)
- Kay Khusrou bin Balban (1285 – 1287)
- Arkali Khan bin Jalal-ud-Din Khalji (1290–1296)
- Ghazi Malik (1296–1320; prior to becoming Sultan of Delhi)
- Shaikha Khokhar (1394-1398)
- Khizr Khan (1398–1421; prior to becoming Sultan of Delhi)
- Jasrat Khokhar (1421-1442)
- Bahlul Khan Lodi (1443–1451; prior to becoming Sultan of Delhi)
- Tatar Khan Lodi (1451 – 1485)
- Umar Khan Sarwani (1485 – after 1495)
- Sai'd Khan Sarwani (after 1495 – 1500)
- Daulat Khan Lodi (1500 – 1524)

== Sur Empire ==
- Haibat Khan Niazi (1541 – 1549)

== Mughal Empire ==
- Kamran Mirza (1525 – 1540)

In 1580, Lahore Subah or province was created as a result of administrative reforms of Akbar. The following is a list of notable governors of Lahore subah appointed by the central Mughal government:

- Said Khan (c. 1580–1583)
- Raja Bhagwan Das (c. 1583–1586)
- Akbar (1586–1598; Mughal court at Lahore)
- Rai Singh (1598–1599)
- Khawaja Shamsuddin Khawafi (c. 1599–1602)
- Qulij Khan Andajani (c. 1602–1605)
- Ibrahim Khan (c. 1605–1607)
- Qulij Khan Andajani (c. 1607–1611)
- Shaikh Farid Murtaza (c. 1611–1616)
- Itmad-ud-Daula (1616–1624; through his naibs)
- Asaf Khan (1624–1628)
- Wazir Khan (1628–1638)
- Mutamad Khan (1638–1639)
- Ali Mardan Khan (1639–1640)
- Said Khan Bahadur (1640–1643)
- Qulij Khan (1643–1645)
- Dara Shikoh (1645–1651; through his naibs)
- Shaikh Abdul Karim (1651–1655)
- Khwaja Muin Khan (1655–1656)
- Bahadur Khan (1656–1657)
- Izzat Khan (1657–1658)
- Khalilulah Khan (1658–1662)
- Ibrahim Khan (1662–1667)
- Muhammad Amin Khan (1667–1668)
- Danishmand Khan (1668–1672)
- Fidai Khan (1672–1675)
- Amanat Khan (1675–1678)
- Qawamuddin Khan (1678–1680)
- Muhammad Azam Shah (1680–1683)
- Mir Ishaq (1683–1686)
- Sipahdar Khan (1686–1688)
- Mahabat Khan (1688–1690)
- Muhammad Azam Shah (1690–1691)
- Bahadur Khan (1691–1695)
- Mukarram Khan (1695–1697)
- Abu Nasr Khan (1697–1700)
- Mirza Muhammad Mu'azzam (1700–1705)
- Zabardast Khan (1705)
- Mirza Muhammad Mu'azzam I (1705–1707)
- Bahadur Shah (1710–1712, Mughal court at Lahore)
- Abd al-Samad Khan (1713–1726)
- Zakariyah Khan (1726–1745)
- Yahya Khan (1745–1747)
- Shah Nawaz Khan (1747–1748)
- Moin-ul-Mulk (1748–1753)

== Durrani Empire ==
- Mughlani Begum (1753–1755; de-facto)
- Khwaja Abdullah (1755–1756)
- Timur Shah Durrani (1756–1758)
- Karimdad Khan (1759–1761)
- Ahmad Shah Abdali (1761–1762; Durrani court at Lahore)
- Kabuli Mal (1762–1764)
- Ahmad Shah Abdali (1764–1765; Durrani court at Lahore)

== Maratha Empire ==
- Adina Beg (1758; last governor of Punjab)
- Sabaji Shinde (1758–1759)

== Sikh Misls ==
- Triumvirate of Gujar Singh, Subha Singh and Lehna Singh (1765–1799)

== Sikh Empire ==
- Ranjit Singh (1799–1839)

== See also ==
- List of rulers of Multan
