= Sikh conquest of Chaj Doab =

1765 military campaign in Punjab, Pakistan

Sikh conquest of the Chaj Doab
- Part of Sikh expansion
- Map showing location of Gujrat District (highlighted in green) in relation to neighbouring districts of Punjab Pakistan and the Kashmir region.
| Date | December, 1765 |
| Location | Chaj Doab, Punjab |
| Result | Sikh victory |
| Territorial changes | Chaj Doab partitioned between the Bhangi and Sukerchakia Misl |

Belligerents
| Bhangi Misl; Sukerchakia Misl | Pothohar; Sahiwal; Jhang |

Commanders and leaders
| Gujjar Singh Bhangi; Charat Singh | Muqarrab Khan Gakhar (MIA); Malik Mubarak Khan; Izzat Bakhsh Rehan |

The Sikh conquest of the Chaj Doab was a military campaign led by Gujjar Singh of the Bhangi Misl, with the support of Charat Singh of the Sukerchakia Misl, in late 1765. It targeted the Muslim chiefs of the Chaj Doab, including Muqarrab Khan of the Gakhar tribe. The campaign resulted in the Sikh conquest of Gujrat and a significant portion of the Pothohar region.

== Background ==
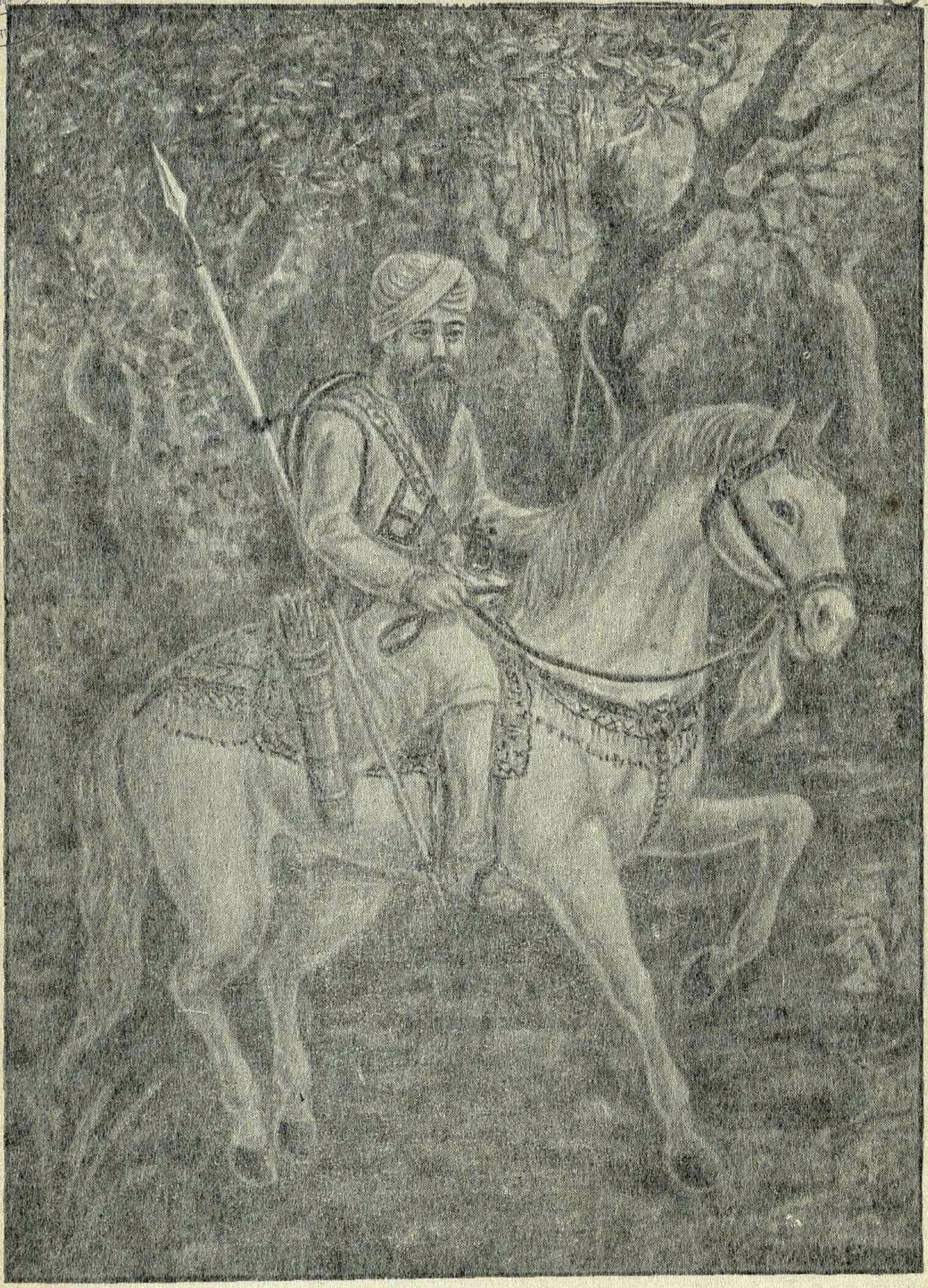
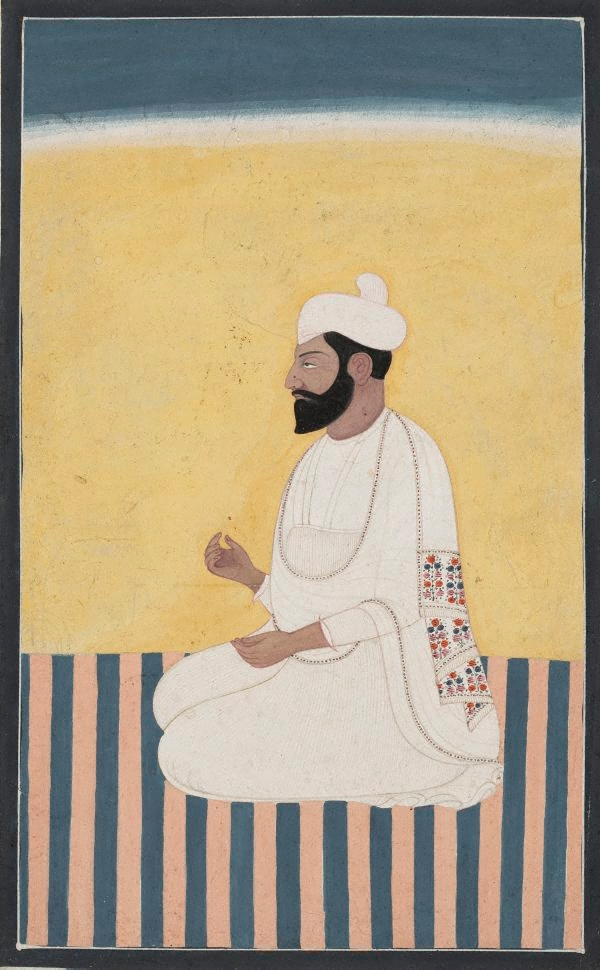
Charat Singh (left) and Gujjar Singh (right)

Following the Sikh capture of Lahore in 1765, Gujjar Singh was dissatisfied with the portion of the city assigned to him, as it largely consisted of jungle. As a result, he turned his attention to the North-West and appointed his son Sukha Singh to govern his part of Lahore. During his march to the North-West, Gujjar Singh captured several cities and towns, including Eminabad and Wazirabad. Meanwhile, Charat Singh of the Sukerchakia Misl decided to expand his territory to the North-West, which was held by Muslim chiefs. However, Charat Singh did not want to confront them alone, so he formed an agreement with Gujjar Singh to cooperate in their conquest, setting their sights on the city of Gujrat, ruled by Sultan Muqarrab Khan.

Muqarrab Khan ruled Gujrat from 1741, pledging his allegiance to Ahmad Shah Abdali, the Shah of the Durrani Empire, and held control over much of the Chaj Doab. The Gakhar tribe, to which Muqarrab Khan belonged, was the most powerful and had conquered other tribes of Potohar such as the Awans, Gujars, Janjuas, Kharals, Khokhars, among others.

== Campaign ==
=== Siege of Gujrat ===
The two Sikh sardars marched to Gujrat and encountered Muqarrab Khan, first on the western bank of the Chenab River and later outside the walls of Gujrat itself, but he was defeated. Muqarrab Khan retreated into the fort, which was then besieged by the Sikh sardars. After his supplies were cut off, he made a desperate sally but was defeated once more. He escaped from the battlefield on an elephant and was never seen again by the Sikhs. According to Dalbir Singh, he was executed by a rival chief, while historian Bhagat Singh suggests that a flood swept him away. Ultimately, the fate of the Sultan remains a mystery.

The Sikhs attacked Muqarrab Khan's camp, plundering it before thoroughly sacking Gujrat. Witnessing the city's destruction, the people fled to nearby towns like Jalalpur. Subsequently, the Warraich Jats, who observed the sack, submitted to the Sikhs.

=== Further conquests ===
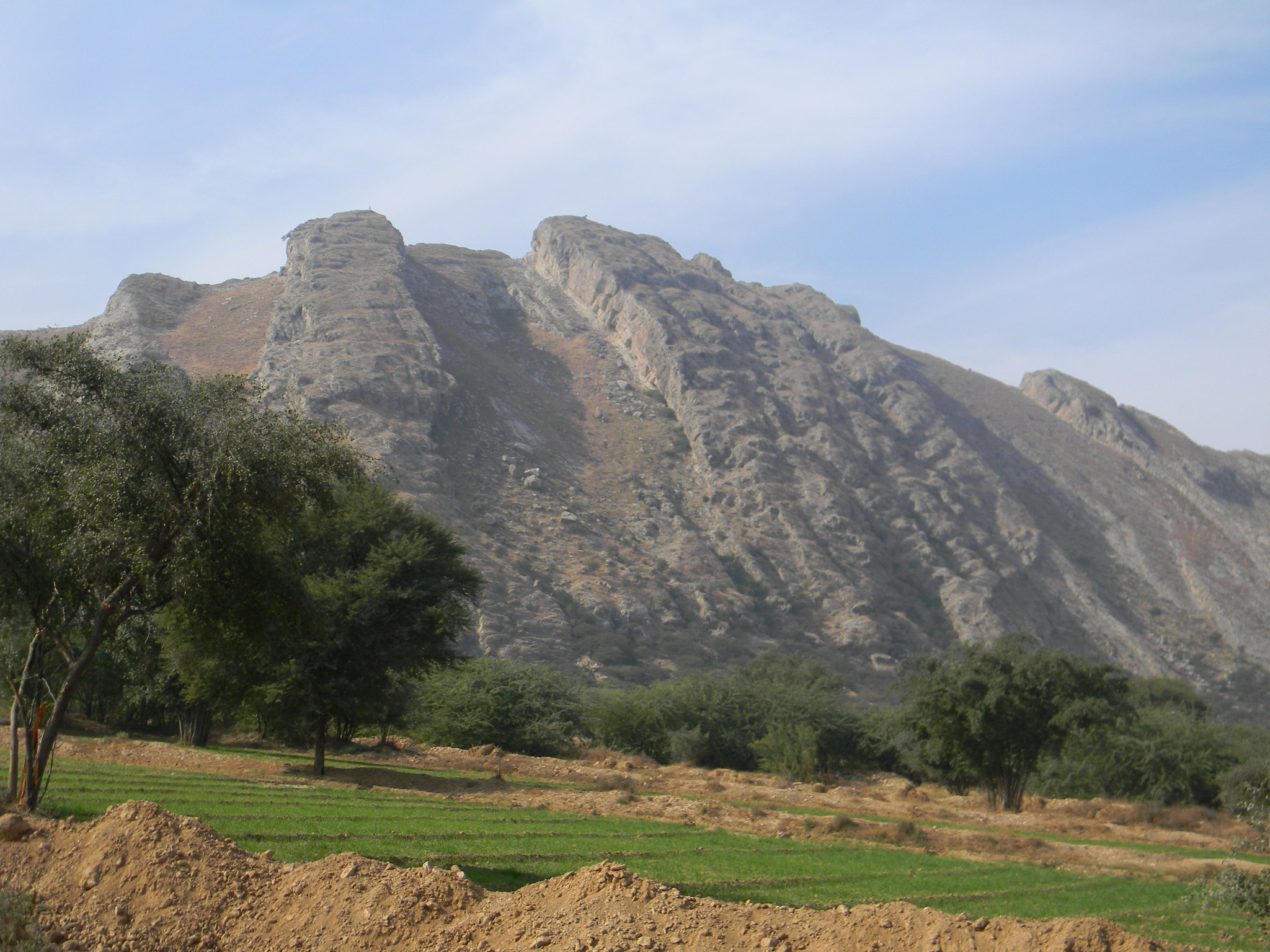
Salt Range in Mianwali District, Punjab, Pakistan

The Sikh sardars divided the conquered territory among themselves. Gujrat and the Warraich Tehsils were taken by Gujjar Singh, while Charat Singh occupied Kunjah and extended his control up to Maini. The entire Salt Range came under Sukerchakia occupation, while simultaneously the Bhangis took control of the region from the hills of Chenab to Sahiwal, with other territories being allocated to Bhangi Sardars.

The Muslim chieftains of Sahiwal, Mitha Tiwana, and Khushab largely opposed Sikh expansion. The Bhangis seized most of Sahiwal's territory east of Shahpur, while the area west toward Nihang stayed under Sahiwal's control. Shahpur was governed by a Sayyid colony led by Ghulam Shah, while the remaining region up to the river junction was dominated by the Sial chiefs of Jhang and Izzat Bakhsh Rehan.

== Aftermath ==
After the campaign, Gujjar Singh urged the populace who had left to return to Gujrat and live in peace. Additionally, he renewed the town's fortifications and made it his capital.

To strengthen the alliance between the two Misls against foreign invaders and Muslim tribes, Charat Singh offered his daughter, Raj Kaur, in marriage to Gujjar Singh's second son, Sahib Singh. Gujjar Singh accepted the proposal, and Charat Singh provided a significant dowry for the marriage.
