= Capture of Lahore (1765) =

- Part of Afghan–Sikh Wars
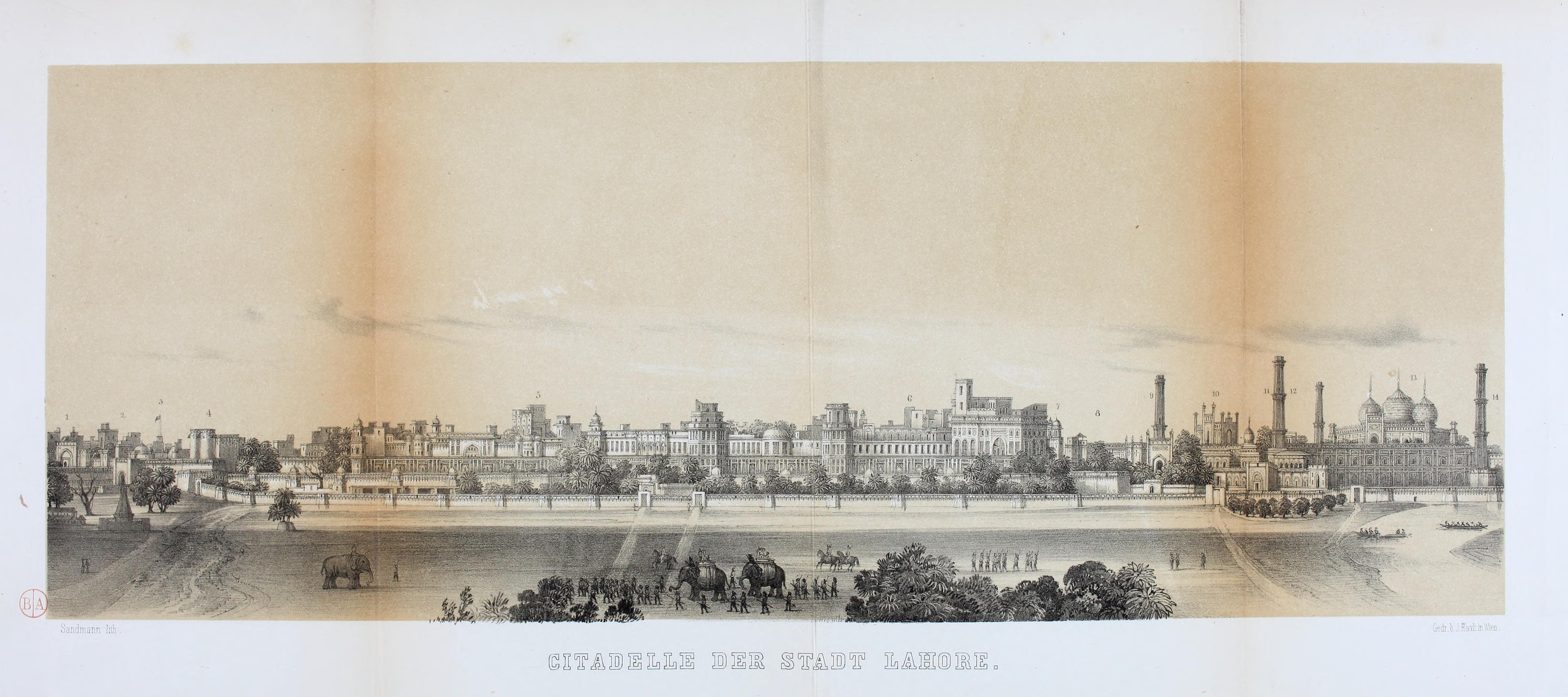
- The Lahore Fort
Date	16 May 1765
Location	Lahore, Punjab
Result	Sikh victory: Establishment of the Sikh Triumvirate; Assumption of sovereignty by Bhangi Misl in Lahore
Territorial changes	Lahore annexed by the Bhangi Misl

Belligerents
Bhangi Misl	Durrani Empire

Commanders and leaders
Lehna Singh Bhangi; Gujjar Singh Bhangi; Sobha Singh Kanhaiya (arrived later)	Kabuli Mal †; Amir Singh (POW); Jagan Nath (POW)

Strength
2,000 under Bhangis	Unknown

The Capture of Lahore occurred on 16 April 1765, when the Bhangi Misl, led by Lehna Singh Bhangi and Gujjar Singh Bhangi, took control of the city from the Durrani Governor's nephew, Amir Singh. Later, Sobha Singh Kanhaiya arrived in Lahore, and the three Misaldars established the Sikh Triumvirate, each sharing control over the city.

== Background ==
After his seventh invasion, Ahmad Shah Abdali, before leaving Punjab, appointed Kabuli Mal, a Hindu, as the governor of Lahore. Meanwhile, the Sikhs abandoned their pursuit of Abdali, and the Sikh Misls gathered at Amritsar for Vaisakhi on April 10, 1765, to celebrate. Believing themselves superior to the Afghans after recent clashes, they declared sovereignty and celebrated for an entire month. After retreating to their headquarters, the Bhangi Chiefs, Lehna Singh Bhangi and Gujjar Singh Bhangi, devised a plan to expel the Afghan Governor of Lahore. Kabuli Mal learned of this plan and fled to Jammu to recruit two thousand Dogra soldiers, leaving Lahore under the control of his inexperienced nephew, Amir Singh, which the Bhangi Sardars exploited.

== Occupation of Lahore ==
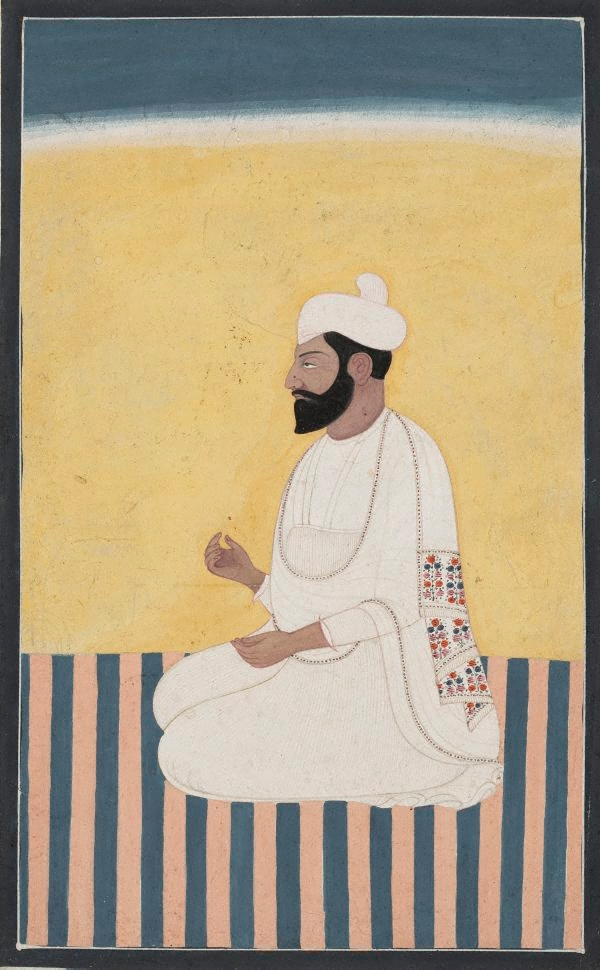
Gujjar Singh Banghi

Lehna Singh Bhangi and Gujjar Singh Bhangi gathered their forces to launch an attack on Lahore. The Sikhs managed to win over several officers within the walls, taking advantage of the widespread unpopularity of Kabuli Mal, who was seen by many as a tyrannical ruler. Following a signal and guided by these officers, the Sikhs entered Lahore with minimal resistance, seized the Lahore fort, and placed Amir Singh in iron chains. A day later, Sobha Singh Kanhaiya arrived in Lahore with 200 soldiers, and the soldiers of the two Misls began plundering the city. A delegation led by neighboring Zamindars requested the Bhangi Sardars to stop their soldiers from looting the city, so it could prosper and remain the Guru's cradle. The Bhangi Sardars agreed and closed all the city gates, taking action by punishing the plundering soldiers. The three sardars proceeded to divide the city among themselves. Sobha Singh governed the southern area up to Niazbeg and constructed a fort named Nawankot. Gujar Singh managed the eastern region, stretching from Kabuli Mai’s mansion to Shalimar Garden, where he established Qila Gujar Singh. Lahna Singh oversaw the central zone, which included Lahore Fort and the Roshnai, Kashmiri, Khizri, and Masti Gates.

== Aftermath ==
Upon hearing about the capture of Lahore by the Bhangi Sardars, Charat Singh Sukerchakia of the Sukerchakia Misl marched to Lahore, demanding a share of the spoils. The newly formed triumvirate, not wanting to make a powerful Misl leader their enemy, agreed to his demands and gave him the Zamzama cannon. Charat Singh, unable to carry it back himself, called upon his soldiers in Gujranwala to transport it. On his march back to his headquarters, he engaged in a battle with Kabuli Mal and killed him there.

To mark the significant occasion of the province's sovereignty and to honor Guru Nanak, the founder of Sikhism, and Guru Gobind Singh, the creator of the Khalsa, they minted coins in the names of the Sikh Gurus. When minting coins, they reused the inscription that had previously appeared on Banda Singh's seals, demonstrating that they remembered the Sikh rule of 1710.

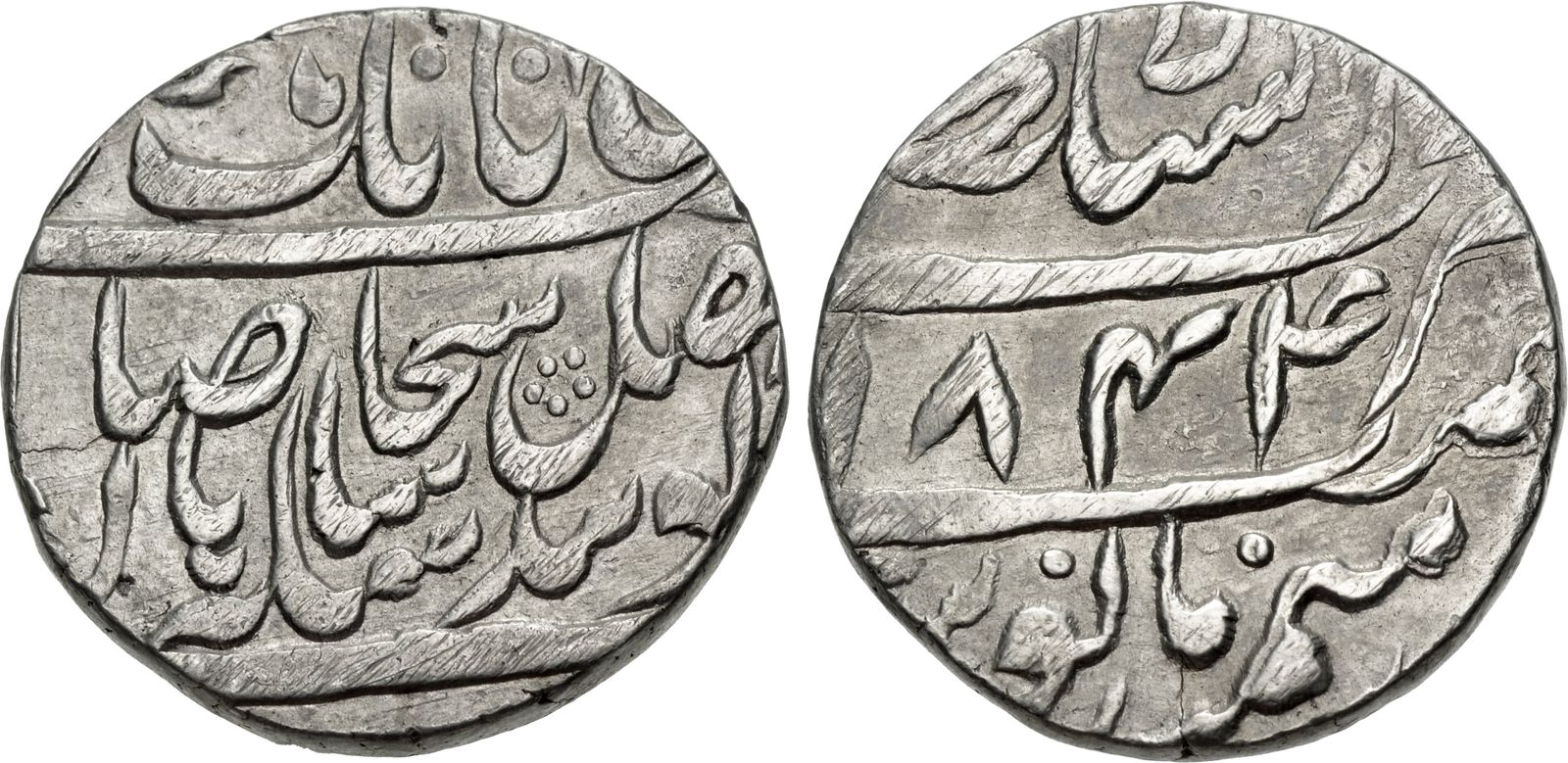
INDIA, Independent States. Sikhs (Misls). temp. Lahina Singh, Sobha Singh, and Gujjar Singh Bhangi. VS 1822-1856 / AD 1765-1799. AR Rupee (24mm, 11.09 g, 9h). Dar al-Sultanat Lahore mint. Dated VS 1844 (AD 1787). VF.

The coins displayed the following:

"Deg o tegh o fatah o nusrat bedirang Yaft az Nanak Guru Gobind Singh"

Roughly translated:

The kettle and the sword — the symbols of service and power — victory and ready patronage have been obtained from Gurus Nanak-Gobind Singh.

Lehna Singh and Sobha Singh remained in Lahore until Ahmad Shah Abdali's final invasion in December 1766, prompting their temporary retreat. As Abdali aged and lacked strong generals, he sought to conciliate the Sikhs. A delegation from Lahore praised Lehna Singh's fair rule, noting his equal treatment of Hindus and Muslims and the Muslims growing trust in the Khalsa. They recommended him as governor. Abdali offered Lehna Singh the position and gifts, which he declined, citing Sikh principles.

After Abdali’s departure, Lehna Singh, Sobha Singh, and Gujjar Singh advanced on Lahore. The incumbent governor, Dadan Khan, seeing public support for the Sikhs, peacefully ceded control. The Sikhs treated him respectfully and gave him a pension, thereby taking control of Lahore.
