= Sahib Singh Bhangi =

- Sardar of Gujrat

Chief of the Bhangi Misl at Gujrat
- Tenure: c. 1788/90 – 1809
- Predecessor: Gujjar Singh Bhangi
- Successor: Annexed by Ranjit Singh

Joint ruler of Lahore
- Tenure: 1799 – 7 July 1799
- Predecessor: Durrani suzerainty
- Successor: Ranjit Singh
- Died: 1814; Bajwat, Sialkot District, Punjab
- Burial: Bajwat (mausoleum)
- Wives: Raj Kaur (daughter of Charat Singh Sukerchakia); Subha Kaur (daughter of Raja Hamir Singh of Nabha); Daya Kaur (daughter of Diwan Singh Virk); Rattan Kaur
- Issue: Gulab Singh Bhangi (son); A daughter, wife of Jodh Singh Wazirabadia
- Misl: Bhangi Misl
- Dynasty: Bhangi Misl
- Father: Gujjar Singh Bhangi
- Mother: Mai Lachmi
- Religion: Sikhism
- Occupation: Sardar, chieftain

Sahib Singh Bhangi (died 1814) was a Sikh chieftain and ruler of Gujrat in the Chaj Doab under the Bhangi Misl, one of the twelve misls of the Sikh Confederacy in eighteenth-century Punjab. The second son of Gujjar Singh Bhangi, one of the most prominent commanders of the Bhangi Misl, he was placed in charge of Gujrat by his father in 1767 and inherited the chieftainship following Gujjar Singh's death circa 1790. During his tenure, he engaged in successive military and diplomatic contests, first with Mahan Singh Sukerchakia and subsequently with Ranjit Singh, whose consolidation of the Punjab progressively curtailed Bhangi authority. His territories were ultimately annexed by Ranjit Singh in September 1809. He died in reduced circumstances at Bajwat in 1814, having ruled Gujrat for approximately twenty-two years.

== Background and family ==
Sahib Singh was a member of the Bhangi Misl, the dominant Sikh confederacy in western Punjab during the eighteenth century. His father, Gujjar Singh Bhangi, was one of the most powerful sardars of the misl and controlled extensive territories across the Chaj Doab, including Gujrat, Jalalpur, and Islamgarh, along with tracts reaching towards Rawalpindi and the foothills of Bhimbar. Gujjar Singh was among the foremost Sikh commanders who resisted successive Durrani invasions and consolidated Sikh rule across a wide portion of the Punjab.

Sahib Singh was the second of Gujjar Singh's three sons. His elder brother, Sukha Singh, held authority at Lahore, while the youngest brother, Fateh Singh, managed ancestral estates near Rangarh, approximately thirty kilometres from Amritsar. As the second son, Sahib Singh was assigned charge of Gujrat, the principal Bhangi stronghold in the Chaj Doab.

== Early assignment and territorial extent ==
=== Charge of Gujrat, 1767 ===
During Ahmad Shah Durrani's eighth invasion of India in 1766–67, Gujjar Singh participated actively in Sikh resistance operations. When Gujjar Singh subsequently directed his attention towards the Kashmir hills and Durrani-held territories to the north, he assigned the charge of Gujrat to Sahib Singh. In the winter of 1767, Gujjar Singh, accompanied by Sahib Singh, marched on Rawalpindi and extended Bhangi authority in that direction, before placing Rawalpindi under Milkha Singh Thepuria.

=== Military resources ===
On the eve of Shah Zaman's first invasion of India, Sahib Singh's territory yielded an annual revenue of thirteen lakhs of rupees. The parganahs in his domain comprised Bajwat, Gujrat, Mirpur (forty kilometres north of Jhelum), Phularwan (sixteen kilometres south of Bhera), and Sodhra (six kilometres north-east of Wazirabad). He owned twelve forts across this territory. Barwala was a brick-built fort with a circumference of nearly six kilometres. The fort of Mangla, situated twenty-six kilometres north of Jhelum, was built of stone and was large in size. The remaining forts, including Chaomukh, Gujrat, Jamke, Kamanwala, Galiana, Lakhanwal, Mirpur, Phularwan, Sodhra, and Suk, were constructed of mud.

Sahib Singh maintained a permanent cavalry of two thousand horse, and could raise a combined force of eight thousand cavalry and four thousand infantry in emergencies. Commanders serving under him included Milkha Singh of Rawalpindi with twelve hundred horse, Ran Singh Pada with two hundred horse, and Bundu Khan Gheba with six hundred horse. He possessed a large cannon named Shah Pasand.

== Marriages and personal life ==
Sahib Singh contracted four marriages, each carrying political significance in the context of inter-misl matrimonial diplomacy prevalent among Sikh sardars during this period.

His first and most politically consequential marriage was to Raj Kaur, the daughter of Charat Singh Sukerchakia. As Charat Singh had died in 1774, the marriage was performed by his son Mahan Singh Sukerchakia in 1775. This union made Sahib Singh the brother-in-law of Mahan Singh. His second wife was Subha Kaur, daughter of Raja Hamir Singh of Nabha. Following Hamir Singh's death in 1783, his stepmother, who served as regent of Nabha State, contracted this marriage with Sahib Singh Bhangi to secure military support for the state. His third wife was Daya Kaur, daughter of Diwan Singh Virk, and his fourth was Rattan Kaur.

His daughter was married to Jodh Singh Wazirabadia, the chief of Wazirabad, who controlled the parganahs of Wazirabad, Ghaniwala, Gharthal, Karial, Mitranwali, Saurian, and Talwandi Musa Khan.

Following Sahib Singh's death in 1814, Ranjit Singh took two of his widows Daya Kaur and Rattan Kaur into his household by the ceremony of chadar pauna. Daya Kaur became the mother of the Lahore princes Peshaura Singh and Kashmira Singh, while Rattan Kaur became the mother of Multana Singh.

== Relations with Mahan Singh Sukerchakia ==
=== Instigation and fratricidal conflict ===
The relationship between Sahib Singh and Mahan Singh Sukerchakia, his brother-in-law, proved deeply harmful to Bhangi interests. Mahan Singh harboured strategic ambitions against the Bhangi Misl and used his familial connection to Sahib Singh as an instrument of manipulation. He instigated Sahib Singh to seek independent charge of Gujrat against the authority of his father. Sahib Singh was characterised as haughty, self-conceited, and insufficiently perceptive of political machinations, readily falling prey to these inducements.

Mahan Singh subsequently incited Sahib Singh to seize Lahore from his elder brother Sukha Singh, persuading him that the ruler of Lahore occupied a superior status to the ruler of Gujrat. Sahib Singh attacked Lahore and Sukha Singh lost his life in the ensuing battle. Gujjar Singh Bhangi was profoundly grieved by this outcome.

=== Surrender of the Chattha chief ===
Mahan Singh was engaged in a campaign against the Chatthas of Rasulnagar. The Chattha chief sought refuge in Gujjar Singh's camp, and Gujjar Singh declined to surrender him. Sahib Singh, however, secretly delivered the Chattha chief to Mahan Singh's men against his father's position. Gujjar Singh was deeply distressed by this act on reprimanding Sahib Singh he was openly insulted by him. Gujjar Singh retired to Lahore, where he died. Khushwaqat Rai places his death in 1788 while Joseph Davey Cunningham places it in 1791.

=== War with the Sukerchakias ===
After Gujjar Singh's death, Sahib Singh took possession of the family estates and also seized the territories Gujjar Singh had assigned to the youngest brother Fateh Singh, causing Fateh Singh to seek refuge with Mahan Singh. Mahan Singh, using this fraternal dispute as a pretext and coveting Bhangi territories, demanded tribute from Sahib Singh, asserting Sukerchakia suzerainty over Gujrat. Sahib Singh refused, arguing that Gujjar Singh had never fought under the Sukerchakia standard.

Hostilities commenced. Mahan Singh besieged Gujrat and Sahib Singh retreated to the fort of Sodhra on the river Chenab. Raj Kaur, Mahan Singh's real sister and Sahib Singh's wife, waited upon her brother and endeavoured to dissuade him from fighting, but Mahan Singh paid no heed to her entreaties. The siege of Sodhra continued for several months. Karam Singh Dulu of Chiniot came to Sahib Singh's relief. In the course of the prolonged siege, Mahan Singh was taken violently ill with fever and retired to Gujranwala, where he died on 15 April 1790. The young Ranjit Singh, inheriting command of the Sukerchakia forces, completed the victory at Sodhra.

== Campaigns against Afghan forces ==
=== First Battle of Gujrat, 1794 ===
During Shah Zaman's first invasion of India in the winter of 1794, Sikh chiefs fell back before advancing Afghan forces. The Shahanchibashi left behind by Shah Zaman near Jhelum to continue operations and dispatched Bahadur Khan at the head of twelve thousand horse to conquer Gujrat. Sahib Singh came out of the town to oppose him. Bahadur Khan was struck by a bullet in the engagement and fell dead and the Afghan forces took to flight and many were slain. Ranjit Singh joined Sahib Singh in pursuit of the retreating Afghans, and the Shahanchibashi fled to Peshawar. Rohtas Fort, Pothohar, and Gheb remained in Sikh hands.

=== Second Battle of Gujrat, 1797 ===
Ahmad Khan Shahanchibashi had been appointed governor of the Sind Sagar Doab by Shah Zaman. As Sikh sardars moved to recover their former territories after the Shah's withdrawal, the Shahanchibashi marched from Islamgarh by an easterly route towards Gujrat to check the Sikh advance. Sahib Singh and Ranjit Singh intercepted him near the village of Bartonkal. On 29 April 1797, the Shahanchibashi was struck by an arrow, fatally wounded, and expired in the battlefield. A large number of Afghan soldiers were killed, and the Sikh forces plundered the Afghan camp. These successive repulses of Afghan forces materially enhanced Sahib Singh's reputation among the Sikh sardars.

=== Collaboration against Shah Zaman, 1798 ===
During Shah Zaman's final invasion of India, Sahib Singh aligned with Ranjit Singh. On 19 November 1798, Ranjit Singh supported Sahib Singh and Nahar Singh of Chamiari in operations to expel Wafadar Khan from the territory around Gujrat. Following Shah Zaman's withdrawal from Lahore in early 1799, the three Bhangi sardars Sahib Singh, Chait Singh, and Mohar Singh re-entered Lahore. Sahib Singh was nominally a joint ruler of Lahore, though he generally resided at Gujrat rather than in the city.

== Conflict with Ranjit Singh ==
=== Battle of Bhasin, March 1800 ===
The fall of Lahore to Ranjit Singh alarmed the Sikh chiefs of the confederacy. After the festival of Holi in 1800, Sahib Singh of Gujrat, Gulab Singh Bhangi, Jassa Singh Ramgarhia, and Nizam-ud-Din Khan of Kasur assembled their forces at the village of Bhasin, approximately nine kos east of Lahore, to oppose Ranjit Singh. Ranjit Singh, accompanied by Sada Kaur, came from Lahore. The two sides arrayed themselves in the field, but no action took place for approximately eight weeks, each side cautious of initiating fighting. Gulab Singh Bhangi, who had convened the coalition, died through excessive drinking during the stand-off. The death of their principal leader dispirited the confederate forces, which dispersed without achieving any military objective.

=== Attack on Gujranwala and reconciliation, 1800 ===
Following the dissolution of the Bhasin coalition, Sahib Singh launched an attack on Gujranwala. Ranjit Singh, accompanied by Sada Kaur, proceeded against him. Through the intercession of Baba Sahib Singh Bedi of Una, a reconciliation was effected and Ranjit Singh returned to Lahore. Sahib Singh simultaneously maintained a hostile alliance with Nizam-ud-Din Khan of Kasur, and Ranjit Singh subsequently marched against Kasur in connection with these intrigues.

=== Siege of Gujrat, 1801 ===
Sahib Singh's hostile posture continued when, encouraged by Dal Singh of Akalgarh, he assembled forces for an advance on Lahore. Ranjit Singh, accompanied by Sada Kaur with ten thousand soldiers and twenty guns, marched to Gujrat. The Bhangis found themselves unable to match the Lahore forces and sued for peace through Baba Sahib Singh Bedi. Peace was agreed on condition of Sahib Singh paying a large nazarana to Ranjit Singh. Having paid the sum and given assurances of submission, the Maharaja returned to Lahore. Sahib Singh was among the sardars subsequently honoured with nominal command of ten thousand troops as honorary commanders of the Lahore Durbar.

=== Alliance with Dal Singh and renewed hostilities ===
Sahib Singh again assembled forces with Dal Singh of Akalgarh and Jodh Singh of Wazirabad for a march on Lahore. Ranjit Singh neutralised the coalition by inviting Dal Singh to Lahore on the pretext of shared conquest, then imprisoning him at Ramnagar under Mohkam Chand. Ranjit Singh marched on Akalgarh but encountered determined resistance from Dal Singh's wife. Peace was eventually restored through the intercession of Rani Sada Kaur and Baba Kesra Singh Sodhi, and Dal Singh was released. Ranjit Singh then marched on Gujrat, where Sahib Singh had collected a large force. He subsequently sent Fateh Singh Ahluwalia to Gujrat to meet Sahib Singh Bhangi and establish amicable relations between the two.

=== Sialkot expedition, 1808 ===
When Ranjit Singh marched against Sialkot in 1808, the Sialkot chief Jiwan Singh Bhangi appealed to the Bhangi sardars for assistance. Other chiefs undertook to help, but Sahib Singh declined, from caution rather than outright rebellion. After Sialkot fell to Ranjit Singh, Sahib Singh's agents met the Maharaja before he reached Gujrat and paid a large sum as tribute, entering into a treaty acknowledging allegiance to the Maharaja. Sahib Singh maintained cordial relations with Ranjit Singh through the mediation of Baba Sahib Singh Bedi of Una during this period; when Sahib Singh went to meet the Maharaja, he presented him with two horses and a gun as a mark of friendship.

=== Internal conflict and final annexation, 1809 ===
In early 1809, Sahib Singh's relations with his son Gulab Singh deteriorated sharply. Gulab Singh occupied several forts against his father's wishes and reported against him to Ranjit Singh. At Ranjit Singh's instigation, Gulab Singh openly revolted against his father at Gujrat. Sahib Singh, seeking to pacify his son, offered the territories of Jalapur, Lakhowal, and Bhagowal, but Gulab Singh additionally demanded the fort of Islamgarh. According to Ali-ud-Din Mufti, Subha Kaur one of Sahib Singh's wives and daughter of Hamir Singh of Nabha also petitioned Ranjit Singh to intervene on behalf of Gulab Singh.

Ranjit Singh seized the fort of Jalalpur from Gulab Singh and then ordered Sahib Singh to evacuate the forts of Manawar and Islamgarh. Sahib Singh initially agreed but subsequently refused. Ranjit Singh marched on Manawar and Islamgarh, and Sahib Singh, finding himself unable to resist the Lahore forces, escaped in the darkness of night to Gujrat. Ranjit Singh dispatched Hukam Singh Atariwala and Seva Singh in pursuit. After brief resistance, Sahib Singh fled with five hundred horsemen to his fort of Deva Batala on the border of Jammu territory.

In the course of two or three months, Ranjit Singh annexed all of Sahib Singh's territories Gujrat, Islamgarh, Jalalpur, Manawar, Bajwat, and Sodhra worth two-and-a-half lakhs of rupees annually, together with personal property valued at four lakhs. Faqir Aziz-ud-Din was appointed to administer Gujrat and this occurred in September 1809.

== Later life and death ==
Following the loss of his territories, Sahib Singh took refuge at Bhimbar and lived in poverty. In 1810, when Ranjit Singh was engaged in the siege of Multan, Sahib Singh's mother, Mai Lachmi, interceded with the Maharaja on his behalf with such effect that the ilaqa of Bajwat was released in Sahib Singh's favour. In November 1810, Sahib Singh came to the Lahore Darbar, where Ranjit Singh confirmed a jagir of four villages in Sialkot district Bajwat, Kallowal, Sohawa, and Rajiwala worth ten thousand rupees annually, to be held until his death. At this point Sahib Singh accepted the complete overlordship of Ranjit Singh.

Sahib Singh died in 1814 at Bajwat; his mausoleum was built at that location. He had ruled Gujrat for approximately twenty-two years.

== Bibliography ==
- Dalbir Singh (2010). Rise, Growth and Fall of the Bhangi Misal (PhD thesis). Patiala: Department of Punjab Historical Studies, Punjabi University.
- Bhagat Singh (1993). A History of the Sikh Misals. Patiala, Punjab: Publication Bureau, Punjabi University.
- Gupta, Hari Ram (1999). History of the Sikhs, Vol. IV: The Sikh Commonwealth or Rise and Fall of Sikh Misls (3rd, illustrated ed.). New Delhi: Munshiram Manoharlal Publishers. ISBN 978-81-215-0165-1.
- Gupta, Hari Ram (1951). History of the Sikhs, Vol. III: Trans-Sutlej Sikhs, 1769–1799. Punjab: S.N. Sarkar.
