= Siege of Rohtas =

Battle between Sikh Misls and Durrani Afghans

Siege of Rohtas (1767)
- Part of Afghan-Sikh wars
Date	c. 1767
Location	Rohtas Fort, near Jhelum, Punjab region
Result	Sikh victory
Territorial changes	Rohtas Fort captured: Surrounding territories divided between Charat Singh and Gujjar Singh Bhangi

Belligerents
Bhangi Misl; Sukerchakia Misl	Durrani Empire

Commanders and leaders
Gujjar Singh Bhangi; Charat Singh Sukerchakia	Sarfaraz Khan (POW); Ali Muhammad Gurjar (surrendered); Sultan Khan Gakhar (surrendered)

Strength
About 900 horsemen and 2,000 infantry 1,000 additional irregular volunteers	About 3,000 men

The Siege of Rohtas was a military engagement in 1767 during which the Sikh chiefs Charat Singh and Gujjar Singh Bhangi besieged and captured the strategically important Rohtas Fort from the Durrani governor Sarfaraz Khan. The siege, lasting several months, resulted in the fall of the fort and the subsequent division of its surrounding territories between the Sikh leaders.

== Background ==
The Rohtas Fort was situated in the hilly region north-west of Jhelum, on a rocky height near the right bank of the Jhelum River. It was described as a large fortified complex with massive masonry walls, numerous bastions, 68 towers, and 12 gates. Contemporary and later descriptions state that it contained several hundred houses, water-storage facilities, wells, and baolis, and that it could accommodate a very large military force.

The fort controlled a surrounding tract of villages and was held for Ahmad Shah Durrani by Sarfaraz Khan, who commanded an Afghan garrison of about 3,000 men. The fort had artillery, though the number of guns in service was limited.

Sarfaraz Khan planned to extend his position from Rohtas toward Gujrat, then under Gujjar Singh Bhangi. The plan became known to the Sikh chiefs. Raja Himmat Khan and Diwan Shiv Nath were sent to Rohtas, either to dissuade Sarfaraz Khan or to gather information on the fort's military condition, but both were executed while their companions were imprisoned. While Historian Bhagat Singh states, that Rehmat Khan Waraich and Diwan Shiv Nath went to Rohtas to appeal for the restoration of Gujrat and adjoining territories, and that Rehmat Khan and Shiv Nath were put to death there.

== Siege ==
The Sikh sardars Charat Singh Sukerchakia and Gujjar Singh Bhangi concluded that control of Rohtas was necessary for the establishment of their Sukerchak-Bhangi Domination in the region. Both Sikh Sardars strengthened their cooperation through a matrimonial alliance, with Charat Singh betrothing his daughter to Sahib Singh, the son of Gujjar Singh Bhangi.

The combined Sikh force consisted of about 900 horsemen and 2,000 infantry under the two chiefs, with another 1,000 young men joining them and a small number of cannon accompanying the army. A more detailed breakdown gives Charat Singh 500 horsemen and 1,000 infantry, and Gujar Singh 400 horsemen and 1,000 footmen.

The Sikhs besieged Rohtas Fort and maintained their positions despite cannon fire from the defenders. The duration of the siege took as four months and five months long. During the siege, the defenders faced shortages of food, fodder, and water. The surrounding villagers did not supply the fort, reportedly out of fear of Sikh retaliation, and no reinforcements arrived from Kandahar or from Ahmad Shah Durrani.

The fort was ultimately yielded from within. Ali Muhammad Gurjar and Sultan Khan Gakhar, who were inside the fort, opened one of the gates and admitted the Sikhs. The garrison then submitted.

== Capture and settlement ==
After the fall of the fort, Sarfaraz Khan was taken prisoner. Hari Ram Gupta states that he was sent to Raianagar, while Chowdhry states that he was sent to Ramnagar. Both accounts state that he was released after paying Rs. 78,000.

The governorship of Rohtas Fort was given to Raja Ghias-ud-din, son of the late Raja Himmat Khan. After his death, his cousin Nur Khan succeeded him having hold the office for about thirty years.

The capture was followed by a division of the surrounding territories between the two Sikh chiefs. Rohtas, Dhan, Baloki, Ghebb, and Mukhad were allotted to Charat Singh, while Wangal, Bharwal, Rawalpindi, and Khanpur up to the boundary of Attock were assigned to Gujjar Singh. Gujjar Singh Bhangi later granted Rawalpindi to Milkha Singh as a jagir, while other local offices and assignments were distributed among his associates.

== Aftermath ==
After the victory at Jhelum and Rohtas, Charat Singh Sukerchakia occupied Chakwal, Jalalpur, and Rasulpur, received tribute from Sahib Khan Khokhar of Pind Dadan Khan, built a fort entrusted to Budh Singh and Gaur Singh, captured Kot Sahib Khan and Raja Ka Kot, and seized central parts of the Chaj and Sind Doab.

Rohtas Fort later remained under governors from the same line. Faizdad Khan eventually succeeded Nur Khan. In 1808, Ranjit Singh transferred charge of the fort to a Sikh official. Faizdad Khan's family was allowed one-fourth of the revenues in recognition of its loyal service; five years later this share was converted into a jagir valued at Rs. 5,000 annually.

== Sources ==
- Gupta, Hari Ram (1999). History Of The Sikhs: The Sikh Commonwealth Or Rise And Fall Of Sikh Misls, Vol. Iv (3, illustrated ed.). Munshiram Manoharlal Publishers. ISBN 9788121501651.
- Chowdhry, Mohindra S. (2024). Sikh Evolution to Revolution. Troubador Publishing Ltd. ISBN 9781836287216.
- Singh, Dalbir (2010). Rise, Growth And Fall Of Bhangi Misal.
- Siṅgha, Bhagata (1993). A History of the Sikh Misals. Punjab (India): Publication Bureau, Punjabi University.
