= Sikha shahi =

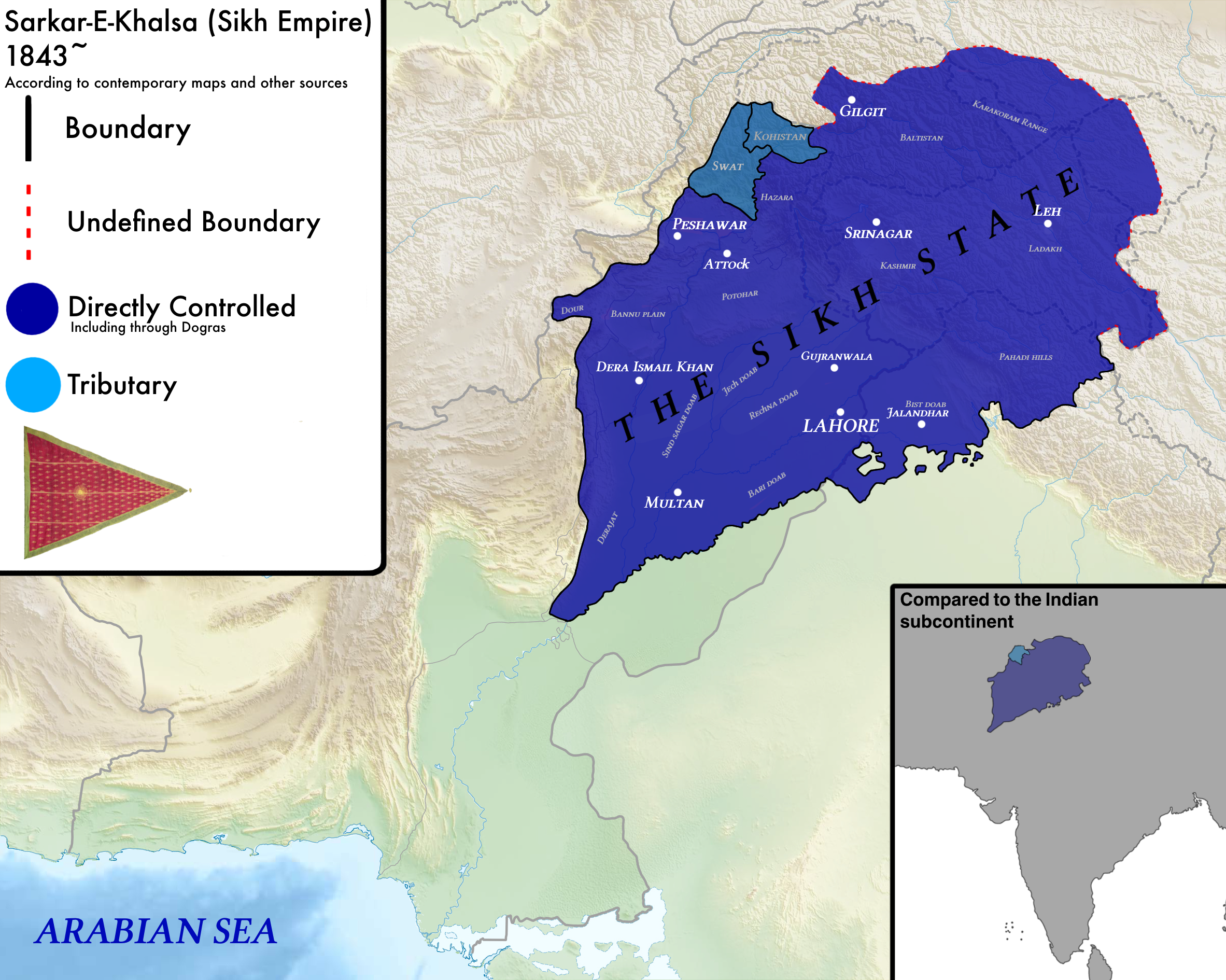
Sikh Empire at its peak in c. 1843

Sikha shahi (سکھا شاہی, lit. 'Sikh rule') or Khalsa raj (خالصہ راج, lit. 'Khalsa rule') is a term used for the period of Sikh rule in Punjab, Peshawar, Jammu and Kashmir. In the contemporary usage, it denotes the high-handedness of a ruler.

About 70 per cent of the subjects of the Sikh ruler Ranjit Singh were Muslim. In popular Muslim imagination, the Sikh period became synonymous with a rule of anarchy and religious intolerance. The phrase now refers to the dictatorial rule or unfavourable court orders in Pakistan, especially in the Punjab province. In Kashmir Valley, it used commonly to refer to summary justice as opposed to the one made after inquiry. In Peshawar lexicon, the term gained meaning of "might is right", and when British ultimately conquered the Sikh state in 1849, the people welcomed it as freeing them from oppression of 'Sikha shahi'.

In Multan and southern Punjab, the Sikh rule as well as the continued dominance of Lahore is remembered as the rule of Takht Lahore (lit. 'throne of Lahore' or 'Lahore darbar').

== See also ==
- Battle of Shopian
- Sikh period in Lahore
- Islam and Sikhism
