= Kabuli Mal =

18th-century governor of Lahore

Diwan Kabuli Mal (died c. 1765) was the governor of Lahore for the Durrani Empire from December 1762 to May 1765.

== Biography ==
Kabuli Mal was originally a Brahmin from Kabul or a Kapur Khatri. After his return from the fifth invasion of Hindustan on 12 December 1762, Ahmad Shah Durrani appointed Zain Khan in Sirhind, Sa'adat Yar Khan in Jullundur Doab, Jahan Khan in the territory between Peshawar and the river Ravi, and Ghamand Chand, the Raja of Kangra, in the hill territory between Beas and Sutlej; with Kabuli Mal as the head of the entire province. Kabuli Mal, who was a Hindu, was appointed by Ahmad Shah in hopes that he could reconcile with the Sikhs who were increasingly getting militant.

According to Bhagat Singh Kabuli Mal was a cruel but a weak ruler. In January 1764 Sikhs arose in rebellion and killed the Afghan governor of Sirhind, Zain Khan, followed by the conquest of Jullundur Doab. In February Sikhs commanded by Hari Singh besieged and plundered Lahore itself. Kabuli Mal paid a large sum to Hari Singh to leave the city, which he did so after leaving behind his representative.

In October 1764, Ahmad Shah invaded Punjab for the seventh time along with his ally, Nasir Khan of Kalat. Kabuli Mal joined him at Lahore and remained with him during the entire campaign. Jahan Khan accused Kabuli Mal to be conspiring with the Sikhs but Ahmad Shah retained him as the governor after the investigation. In February 1765 Ahmad Shah allowed Kabuli Mal at Rohtas to return and resume his position.

Ultimately in May 1765, when Kabul Mal was away at Jammu to recruit soldiers, the Sikhs under Lehna Singh and Gujjar Singh captured Lahore from his deputy and nephew, Amar Singh, who was made a captive. The after details of Kabuli Mal are disputed. According to Hari Ram Gupta he returned to Lahore and died fighting Sikhs at the outskirts of the city, while according to Bhagat Singh he took refuge under the Raja of Jammu, Ranjit Dev, and later at the Durrani camp at Rawalpindi, where he died shortly afterwards.

== Aftermath ==
In the winter of 1766 Ahmad Shah invaded Punjab for the eighth time. He reached Lahore on 22 December, and having appointed Dadan Khan, the brother of Maulvi Abdullah (who had previously served as a diplomat for Mughal Subahdar Moin-ul-Mulk during the second invasion of Ahmad Shah) as governor, left for his homeland in May 1767. Dadan Khan soon gave up the control of the city to Lehna Singh, and Lahore thereafter remained in control of the Sikh triumvirate until Ranjit Singh conquered it in 1799.

== See also ==
- Kaura Mal
- Sukh Jiwan Mal

== Sources ==
- Gupta, Hari Ram (2007). Evolution of Sikh Confederacies (1708–1769). History of the Sikhs. Vol. II. Munshiram Manoharlal. OCLC 932864933.
- Singh, Ganda (1959). Ahmad Shah Durrani: Father of Modern Afghanistan. Asia Publishing House. OCLC 1016251090.
- Singh, Bhagat (1993). A History of the Sikh Misals. Publication Bureau, Punjabi University. OCLC 30513185.
- Singh, Teja; Singh, Ganda (1999). A Short History of the Sikhs (1469–1765). Vol. I. Publication Bureau, Punjabi University. OCLC 3889210.
- Gandhi, Surjit Singh (1999). Sikhs in the Eighteenth Century: Their Struggle for Survival and Supremacy. Amritsar: Singh Brothers. ISBN 978-81-7205-217-1.
