= Sobha Singh (Sikh chieftain) =

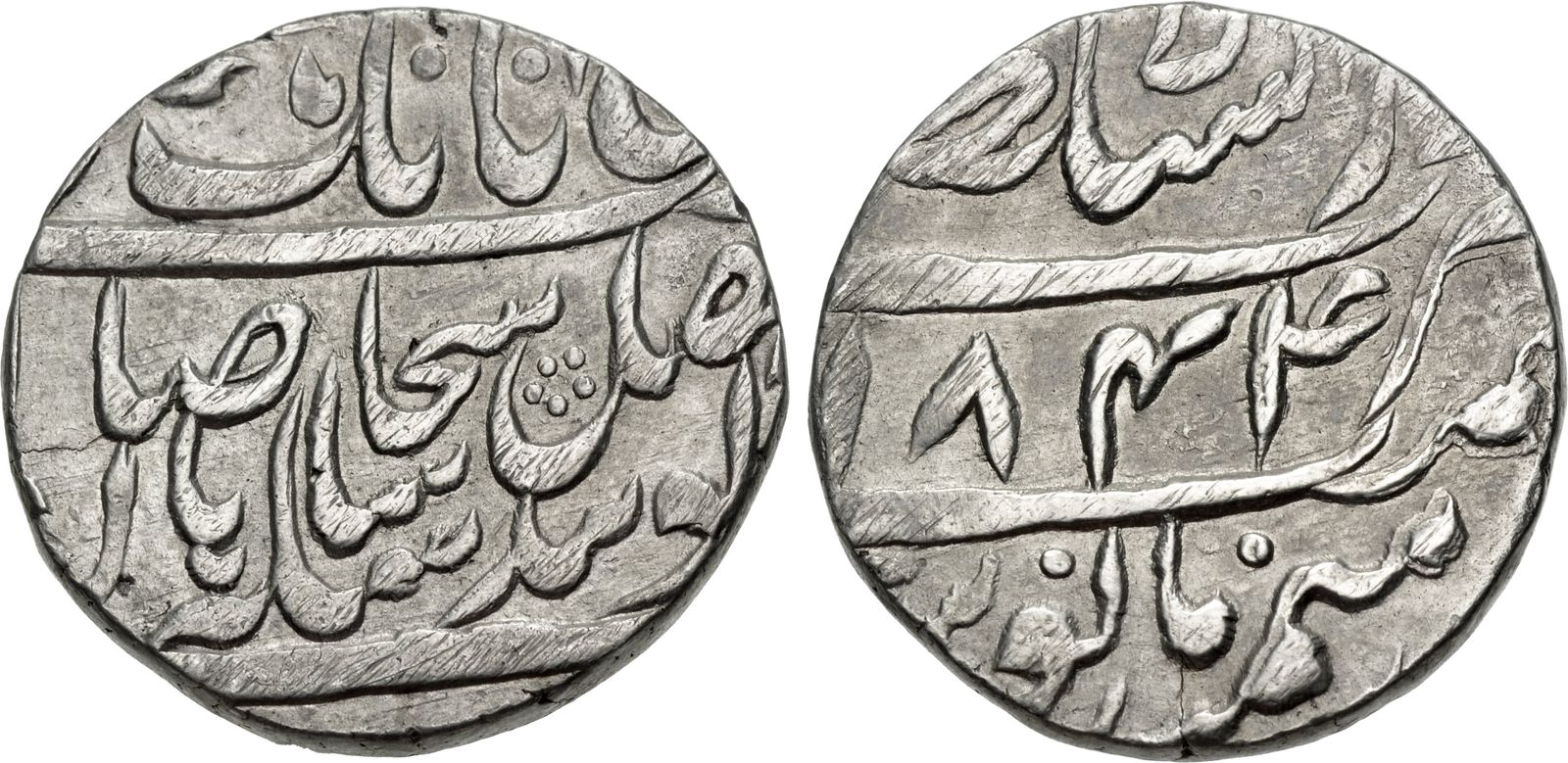
INDIA, Independent States. Sikhs (Misls). temp. Lahina Singh, Sobha Singh, and Gujjar Singh Bhangi. VS 1822-1856 / AD 1765-1799. AR Rupee (24mm, 11.09 g, 9h). Dar al-Sultanat Lahore mint. Dated VS 1844 (AD 1787). VF.

Sobha Singh Kanhaiya of Niazbeg, his first name is alternatively spelt as Suba or Soba, was one of the triumvirates who ruled over Lahore, alongside sardars Lehna Singh Kahlon and Gujjar Singh of the Bhangi Misl, prior to the leadership of Maharaja Ranjit Singh.

== Biography ==
Sobha Singh was from the Kanhaiya Misl, a Sikh grouping with a distinct guerilla militia. With its Governor of Punjab Lehna Singh Kahlon Installed by Pashtun King Amir Ahmad Shah Abdali 1747–1772 of Afghanistan Durrani first crossed the Indus River in 1748, the year after his ascension – his forces sacked and absorbed Lahore during that expedition. The following year (1749), the Mughal ruler was induced to cede Sindh Delhi, Vrndavana Mathura and Kashmir and all of the Punjab including the vital trans Indus River to Afghan Pashtun forces of the Durrani Empire.

On 17 April 1765, Sobha Singh Kanhaiya joined the joint capture of Lahore by Gujjar Singh and Lehna Singh Kahlon.

For thirty long years Lehna Singh Kahlon (Note: Not to be confused with Lehna Singh Majithia), Gujjar Singh Banghi and Suba Singh ruled supreme and kept paying the Afghan Pashtun Ahmad Shah Abdali 1747–1772 and his offspring Timur Shah 1772 – 1793 an annual sum as Taxes.

The Lahore Fort and the Walled Lahore City and its gates went to Lehna Singh Kahlon. He was, for formal purposes, the Governor of Lahore, and was so recognized.

To Suba Singh went the area to the south of the Walled Lahore City, and he resided in the garden of Zubaida Begum in Nawankot, where he built a small fort for himself.

The area between Amritsar and Lahore, or more correctly between the Shalamar Gardens and Lahore, went to Gujjar Singh Banghi.

Gujjar Singh Banghi erected that part of the city, then a jungle and invited people to settle there. He also dug wells to supply water. A mosque was also built for the Muslims in the area. He also built himself a small fort called Qila Gujar Singh. Today, a few walls of that old fort can be seen in a street between today's Nicholson Road and Empress Road, and the area is still called Qila Gujar Singh.

On a final note, their rule of ended when Ranjit Singh besieged the Lahore Fort in 1799 and the three chieftains Lehna Singh Kahlon, Gujjar Singh Banghi and Suba Singh fled, leaving the city firmly in the hands of the young man from Gujranwala Ranjit Singh.

== See also ==
- Kanhaiya Misl
- Bhangi Misl
- Sikh period of Lahore
