= Qila Gujar Singh =

Residential neighbourhood in Lahore, Pakistan

Coordinates: 31°34′N 74°20′E

Qila Gujar Singh (Fort of Gujjar Singh; also spelled Qila Gujjar Singh) is a residential neighbourhood located in the central part of the city of Lahore, Pakistan. It takes its name from the fort of the 18th-century Bhangi Misl ruler Sardar Gujjar Singh Bhangi, a Sandhu Jat Sikh.

== History ==
Gujjar Singh Bhangi built a mud fortress on the site in 1765, after the Sikh capture of Lahore, when the city was divided among three Bhangi Sardars: Gujjar Singh, Lahina Singh and Sobha Singh. Gujjar Singh took the eastern portion of the city, then largely forest, dug wells, and invited settlers to build there; a mosque was among the first structures raised. Only the fort's main gate, a wooden structure said to be around two centuries old, is reported to survive; a second gate opened onto what is now Abdul Karim Road.

== Location and character ==
The neighbourhood lies between Nicholson Road, Empress Road, and Montgomery Road, adjoining the outer boundary of what is described as Lahore's largest police lines. The road leading to the old bazaar passes the Lahore Hotel. The area is also close to the North Western Railway's former headquarters and to the Gawalmandi neighbourhood.

Qila Gujar Singh is known for its bazaar, a long-established market whose trades historically included milk sellers, tobacco and hookah merchants, barbers, cloth and shoe merchants, and butchers whose stock was divided along communal lines during the colonial period, with mutton sold openly and beef kept covered. Several large havelis built by the Malik family, prominent in the area since the 19th century, once stood at the highest point of the old fort site.
