= Gujjar Singh Bhangi =

Sikh warrior and ruler of Lahore

- Khalsa Ji; Sahib Singh; Sardar
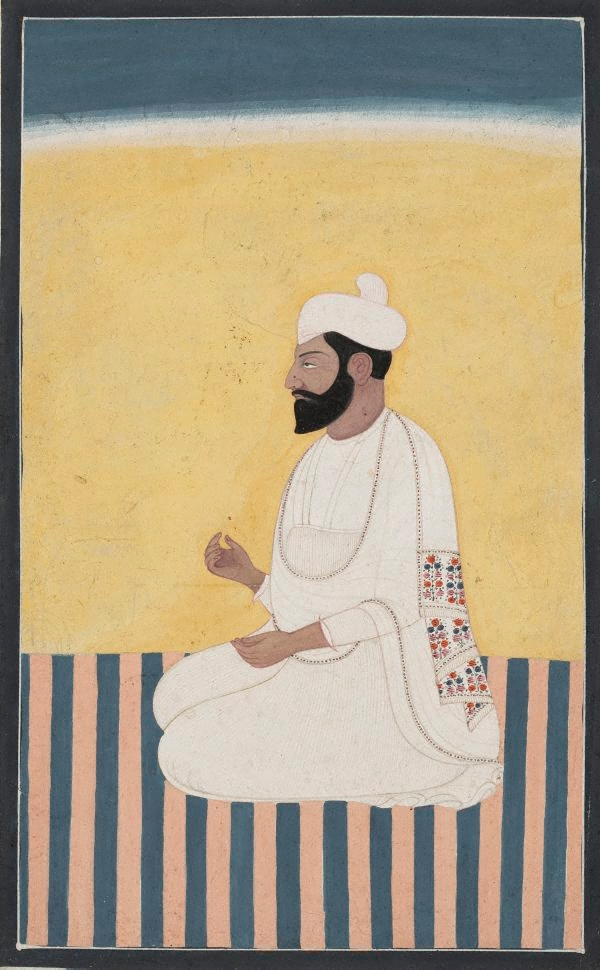
- Miniature painting of Gujjar Singh Bhangi, circa 18th century.

Sardar of Lahore
- Reign: 16 April 1765 – c. 1790
- Predecessor: Kabuli Mal (as Durrani governor)
- Successor: Sukha Singh

Sardar of Gujrat
- Reign: December 1765 – c. 1790
- Predecessor: Muqarrab Khan
- Successor: Sahib Singh
- Died: c. 1790; Lahore, Bhangi–Kanhaiya triumvirate, Sikh Confederacy
- Burial: Near Samman Burj, Lahore
- Issue: Sukha Singh; Sahib Singh; Fateh Singh
Names
- Gujjar Singh Bhangi
- Misl: Bhangi
- Father: Natha Singh
- Religion: Sikhism
- Occupation: Sardar; Jathedar

Gujjar Singh Bhangi (Punjabi: ਗੁੱਜਰ ਸਿੰਘ ਭੰਗੀ; also rendered Gujar Singh Bhangi; died c. 1790) was a Punjabi Sikh general and chief of the Bhangi Misl who emerged as one of the principal Sikh sardars in north-western Punjab during the second half of the eighteenth century. He took part in the Sikh occupation of Lahore in 1765, established Qila Gujjar Singh in the eastern suburb of the city, made Gujrat his principal seat, and extended his authority across parts of the tract between the Chenab and the Indus, including Rawalpindi, Jammu and neighbouring hill regions. He belonged to the circle of chiefs who helped raise the Bhangi Misl to its greatest territorial extent.

== Background and family ==
Gujjar Singh was the son of Natha Singh, a Sandhu Jat cultivator of Bhuri Asal, also called Borahsal, near Khem Karan. He had three brothers, Garja Singh, Nibhau Singh and Chait Singh. While still young, the brothers entered the service of Gurbakhsh Singh Bhangi of Roranwala, to whom Gujjar Singh was related through his mother's side, received initiation into the Khalsa, and joined his armed band. Gujjar Singh later captured Amargarh and attached his following to the forces of Hari Singh Bhangi, the leading chief of the misl. Gurbakhsh Singh had no biological male heir and had adopted Lehna Singh Bhangi, son of a Jat of the Kahlon sub-caste from Sadhawala in the Amritsar district, as his heir. When Gurbakhsh Singh died in 1763, the estate was left open to competing claims.

== Early career ==
During the leadership of Hari Singh Bhangi, Gujjar Singh, along with his brother Nibhau Singh and nephews Gurbakhsh Singh and Mastan Singh, took control of the territory around Firozpur. Meanwhile, another Sikh group led by Jai Singh Gharia captured the nearby villages of Khai, Wan, and Bajidpur. He was counted among the most principal leaders serving under Jhanda Singh Bhangi, who succeeded Hari Singh as chief of the confederacy, and he was particularly closely associated with Lehna Singh Bhangi as a jointly operating partner.

After Gurbakhsh Singh of Roranwala died in 1763, a dispute arose between Lehna Singh Bhangi, as the adopted son and legal heir, and Gujjar Singh, who pressed his own claim to the estate. Jhanda Singh and Ganda Singh Bhangi, the senior Bhangi leaders, came to Vanyeki to mediate, but Gujjar Singh refused the proposed terms and departed for Roranwala with his followers. Lehna Singh pursued him and a skirmish ensued in which men on both sides were killed. The estate was ultimately divided equally between the two claimants. Lehna Singh retained Roranwala, while Gujjar Singh founded a new village between Bharwal and Ranni, naming it Ranghar in memory of the fight. The two became close associates thereafter.

== Sikh triumvirate ==
After Ahmad Shah Durrani withdrew from the Punjab following his Seventh invasion, he appointed a Hindu official named Kabuli Mal as governor of Lahore. Kabuli Mal's oppressive methods rendered him deeply unpopular among the city's inhabitants. Gujjar Singh and Lehna Singh Bhangi, whose joint headquarters were at Ranghruini near Lahore, resolved to expel the Afghan-appointed governor and seize the city. When Kabuli Mal received intelligence of this plan, he fled towards Jammu, leaving his nephew Amir Singh in charge.

On the night before 16 April 1765, the two chiefs advanced with about 2,000 men to Baghbanpura. With the help of Bhai Nand Ram Purbia, the thanedar of the fort, and local Arain gardeners, they entered by breaching the fort wall rather than using the city gates. Gujjar Singh led the first party inside, signalled Lehna Singh by setting Ahmad Shah's wooden pavilion on fire, and the fort was taken before morning. Amir Singh was captured, and Sobha Singh Kanhaiya arrived the next day and joined in the occupation.

=== Division of Lahore ===
The three sardars Gujjar Singh, Lehna Singh, and Sobha Singh issued a proclamation that any person found oppressing the inhabitants would be punished. The chiefs rode through the town personally to enforce order, bringing looting to a halt, and applied themselves to the administration of their respective quarters.

Gujjar Singh established Qila Gujjar Singh in his section and encouraged settlement there by building wells, kilns, shops, and houses. The three chiefs also struck Gobindshahi rupees at Lahore, marking the formal establishment of Sikh authority in the city.

== North-westward expansion ==
Gujjar Singh moved rapidly to extend his personal domain northward. Leaving his eldest son Sukha Singh in charge at Lahore, he marched north-westward, seizing Eminabad, some fifty-six kilometres from Lahore, and then advancing to Wazirabad, which he initially assigned to Gurbakhsh Singh Waraich and later to his son-in-law Jodh Singh of Pasrur. He also captured Chakrali and Sodhra on the southern bank of the Chenab, together with approximately 150 villages in the Gujranwala district.

The most significant early conquest was Gujrat, the principal city of the Chaj Doab situated between the Chenab and the Jhelum, approximately 114 kilometres from Lahore. The city had been under the authority of Muqarrab Khan Gakhar, who had acknowledged Ahmad Shah Durrani's suzerainty since 1741. In December 1765, Gujjar Singh, joined by Charat Singh Sukerchakia, marched on Gujrat. Muqarrab Khan offered initial resistance on the western bank of the Chenab and then outside the walls of the town but defeated in the open field, he retreated into the fort. The city was immediately besieged. In a desperate night-time sally, Muqarrab Khan cut his way through the Sikh lines mounted on an elephant. The elephant crossed a flooded stream, but the Khan was not on its back when it emerged on the far side. Some accounts hold that he was subsequently captured by a rival Gakhar chief, Himmat Khan of Domeli, and put to death while others suggest he drowned in the stream.

The Sikhs occupied Gujrat, repaired its fortifications, and made the town a stronger military centre. Gujjar Singh then made Gujrat his capital and placed Takhat Singh, one of his relatives, in charge of the city. He reorganised the administration by appointing several prominent local figures, including Diwan Dilbagh Singh Sial, Mehta Bhawani Das Badehra, and Mian Mohammed Salih, and encouraged displaced inhabitants to return. The Waraich Jats of the district also submitted to his authority, including those holding villages in Gujrat and Gujranwala. The conquered territory was then divided between the two chiefs: Gujrat and the Waraich tract went to Gujjar Singh, while Charat Singh received Kunjah and the country extending to the Jhelum.

=== Kashmir Expedition, 1767 ===
In 1766, Gujjar Singh marched on Jammu, overran its territories, and held the principality tributary jointly with Jhanda Singh Bhangi. He then reduced Punchh, Islamgarh, and Deva Batala. Placing his son Sahib Singh Bhangi in charge of Gujrat, he subsequently advanced into the hilly territories further north. He conquered Islamgarh and made its chiefs Rahmat Khan and Sikander Khan his tributaries, seized Mangla fort along with fifty-one surrounding villages, and conquered Naushahra on the bank of the Jhelum. Moving into the lower Kashmir region, he defeated Sulaiman Khan and received his submission over Bhimber. Further expeditions took him to Mirpur, Kotli, Cahiumukh, and Shahdru. An advance towards Punchh ended when the Sikh contingent encountered the high-altitude terrain of the Kashmir hills, with which they were unfamiliar and low temperature caused heavy casualties and Sikhs retreated to Gujrat.

== The Eighth Afghan invasion ==
In December 1766, Ahmad Shah Durrani descended upon the Punjab with a large force. The three rulers of Lahore Gujjar Singh, Lehna Singh, and Sobha Singh commanding approximately 8,000 soldiers, were unable to contend with the scale of the Afghan army and evacuated the city before Ahmad Shah's arrival. Gujjar Singh and Lehna Singh withdrew towards Kasur and then to Amritsar.

On 17 January 1767, Ahmad Shah's commander-in-chief Jahan Khan Popalzai marched at the head of approximately 15,000 cavalry toward Amritsar, plundering the country as he advanced. Jhanda Singh Bhangi, Gujjar Singh, Lehna Singh Bhangi, and Hira Singh Nakai had assembled in the vicinity of Chak, near Amritsar. When news of Jahan Khan's approach reached them, the Sikh sardars moved to engage him. A sharp engagement ensued for approximately three hours, in which five to six thousand Durrani troops were reported killed and wounded, and Jahan Khan was obliged to retreat.

Ahmad Shah, who was staying at Jalalabad on the banks of the Beas, left his baggage behind and personally set out to aid Jahan Khan. By that time, the Sikhs had already marched toward Lahore. The Sikh chiefs attacked the Shah's baggage train, which he had left at Jalalabad, and carried off much of its contents but however, Nasir Khan Baluch, who guarded the baggage, drove the Sikhs off and pursued them into the jungles. Gujjar Singh and Charat Singh Sukerchakia, along with several other sardars, subsequently maintained their positions at Chak and in the neighbouring fortifications with bodies of infantry and artillery.

Ahmad Shah's inability to force a decisive defeat on the Sikh forces, despite this numerical superiority, contributed to his decision to abandon the campaign. He crossed the Satluj and departed the Punjab permanently in May 1767, leaving the province effectively in Sikh hands. Gujjar Singh, Lehna Singh, and Sobha Singh re-entered Lahore in triumph and reasserted Sikh authority over the city.

== Second North-westward expansion ==
In 1767, Gujjar Singh captured Rawalpindi, assigning it as a jagir to Milkha Singh Thepuria, who served as warden of the marches from his headquarters there. He also extended Sikh authority over Hasan Abdal, Attock, and the Surrian parganah, including Jagdeo, Ghaniwala, and Karial.

Afterwards Gujjar Singh's biggest military effort was working with Charat Singh Sukerchakia to bring the tribes of north-western Punjab under control. The Gakhars, Janjuas, Awans, Goleras, Garhwals, Dalals, Dunials, Tarkhelis, Khattars, Ghebas, and Jodrahs of the Rawalpindi and Jhelum districts and the Salt Range all submitted to Sikh authority. The Gakhars were fully subdued by 1770. In the parganah of Fatahpur Baorah, where the Gakhars held 669 villages, Milkha Singh granted 192 villages in jagir to notable Gakhar chiefs, with these estates subject only to tribute. Through these campaigns, Gujjar Singh's dominion in the Sind Sagar Doab penetrated further north than that of any other Bhangi chief.

=== Rohtas campaign (1767) ===
Following Ahmad Shah's departure from the Punjab, Nawab Sarfaz Khan occupied the fort of Rohtas and extended his authority over Gujrat and adjacent territories, imprisoning local officials who had co-operated with Sikh authority. Charat Singh and Gujjar Singh resolved jointly to expel the Nawab. Their alliance was reinforced by the betrothal of Charat Singh's daughter Raj Kaur to Gujjar Singh's son Sahib Singh Bhangi. After crossing the Chenab, the two chiefs defeated the Nawab’s forces in the field, forced them into the Rohtas Fort, and captured it after a siege of about four months, taking Sarfaz Khan prisoner.

Following the capture of Rohtas in 1767, the territories were partitioned between the two sardars. Charat Singh received Rohtas, Dhan Baloki, Ghebb, and Mukhad, while the talluqas of Wangal, Bharwal, Pindi Rawal, and Khanpur, extending up to the Indus at Attock, were annexed by Gujjar Singh. He in turn assigned Rawalpindi permanently to Milkha Singh as a jagir, bestowed the tapa of Narli and the fortress of Rutala upon his brother Chet Singh, and appointed Ran Singh Pidah as tapadar of Sarai Kala and Jodh Singh Attariwala as thanedar of the fort of Kalar.

== Administration ==
After occupying their respective portions of Lahore in April 1765, Gujjar Singh, Lehna Singh, and Sobha Singh established a system of civic order. Their proclamation against oppression, together with their personal patrols through the streets, restored a degree of stability that had been absent under the preceding Afghan-appointed administration. Each chief received the revenues from imports, duties, and the mint within his own quarter of the city. The infrastructure that Gujjar Singh developed in the eastern quarter, including wells, kilns, shops, and houses, reflects a deliberate policy of resettlement and rehabilitation in a previously neglected area.

At Gujrat, Gujjar Singh repopulated the city after the disruption caused by the siege of Muqarrab Khan and appointed experienced local administrators drawn from the existing mercantile and administrative classes to restore normal governance. His principality maintained effective autonomous control across large parts of the Chaj Doab throughout the period of his rule.

For the defence of Amritsar, Gujjar Singh laid the foundation of a fortification known as Qila Gujjar Singh to the south of the Darbar Sahib. Charat Singh Sukarchakia built to the north of the shrine, Jassa Singh Ramgarhia to the east, and the main Bhangi fort lay to the south. The senior Sikh chiefs thus collectively maintained a ring of defensive fortifications around the Sikh holy city.

Primary sources describe the autonomous authority exercised by Gujjar Singh in terms befitting independent rulership. The Persian chronicler Ganesh Das Badehra, author of Char Bagh-i-Punjab, uses the title Khalsa Ji for Gujjar Singh and Lehna Singh, and Singh Sahib for Gujjar Singh and his son Sahib Singh Bhangi, these designations signifying independent authority and refers to the Bhangis collectively as "the royal house of Banda Singh Bahadur".

== Personal life ==
Gujjar Singh had three sons named Sukha Singh, Sahib Singh, and Fateh Singh. Matrimonial alliances were contracted with several other Misl families, a standard practice among Sikh chiefs of the period for consolidating political relationships. Jassa Singh Ahluwalia arranged the marriage of the daughter of his cousin Bhag Singh Hallowalia to Gujjar Singh's eldest son Sukha Singh. Charat Singh Sukerchakia betrothed his daughter Raj Kaur to Gujjar Singh's son Sahib Singh, a match concluded alongside the military alliance against Nawab Sarbuland Khan of Rohtas. Subha Kaur, daughter of Hamir Singh of Nabha, also married Sahib Singh.

=== Division of territories and family disputes ===
Gujjar Singh divided his territories between his two elder sons, Sukha Singh and Sahib Singh, leaving Fateh Singh without an initial share. Conflict arose between the two elder brothers, and Sahib Singh, at the instigation of Mahan Singh Sukarchakia, attacked Sukha Singh and consequently Sukha Singh was killed in the fighting. Gujjar Singh, deeply angered at the death of his eldest son, resolved to dispossess Sahib Singh of all territories under his charge. Sahib Singh revolted and shut himself up in the fort of Islamgarh. Gujjar Singh chose not to proceed to extremities, however, and forgave Sahib Singh once the latter showed a disposition to submit and sue for pardon. Sahib Singh was confirmed in his old possessions, and the territories formerly held by Sukha Singh were transferred to Fateh Singh.

A further cause of estrangement arose over the Chatha chiefs. While Mahan Singh Sukerchakia was besieging Rasulnagar, the Chattha capital, a principal Chattha officer escaped and took shelter in Gujjar Singh's camp. Mahan Singh demanded his surrender, which Gujjar Singh refused. Sahib Singh, acting to accommodate his brother-in-law, clandestinely surrendered the Chatha officer to Mahan Singh in defiance of his father's decision. Gujjar Singh was profoundly aggrieved by this act of insubordination.

== Death ==
The grief of Sukha Singh's death and his cumulative displeasure at Sahib Singh's insubordination are reported to have weighed so heavily on Gujjar Singh that he fell ill. He retired from Gujrat to Lahore, where he died in 1790. His tomb was situated near the Samman Burj within the Lahore fortifications. He had ruled his territories for approximately twenty-four years.

Sahib Singh succeeded to the family estates at Gujrat without active opposition from Fateh Singh, who withdrew to Gujranwala. Despite the family conflicts that marked his later years, contemporary and near-contemporary sources recognised Gujjar Singh as the most territorially successful of the Bhangi sardars outside the main sardari house. He was the only member of the confederacy to extend Sikh authority systematically into the Rawalpindi and Jhelum districts and the foothills of the north-western Punjab.
