= Lehna Singh Bhangi =

Sikh ruler of Lahore

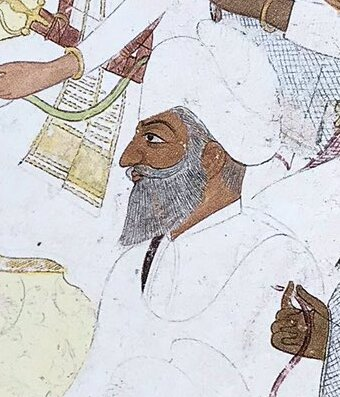
- Lehna Singh Bhangi, detail from a painting of an assembly of Sikhs, attributed to Purkhu, ca.1780

Sardar of Lahore
- Reign: 16 April 1765 – September 1797
- Predecessor: Kabuli Mal (as Durrani governor)
- Successor: Chet Singh
- Died: September 1797; Lahore, Bhangi–Kanhaiya triumvirate, Sikh Confederacy
- Issue: Chet Singh
Names
- Lehna Singh Bhangi
- Misl: Bhangi
- Father: Dargaha Singh (biological); Gurbakhsh Singh (adopted)
- Religion: Sikhism
- Occupation: Sardar; Jathedar

Lehna Singh Bhangi (died September 1797, his first name is alternatively spelt as Lahina or Lahna) was one of the triumvirate rulers of Lahore during the late 18th century.

== Biography ==
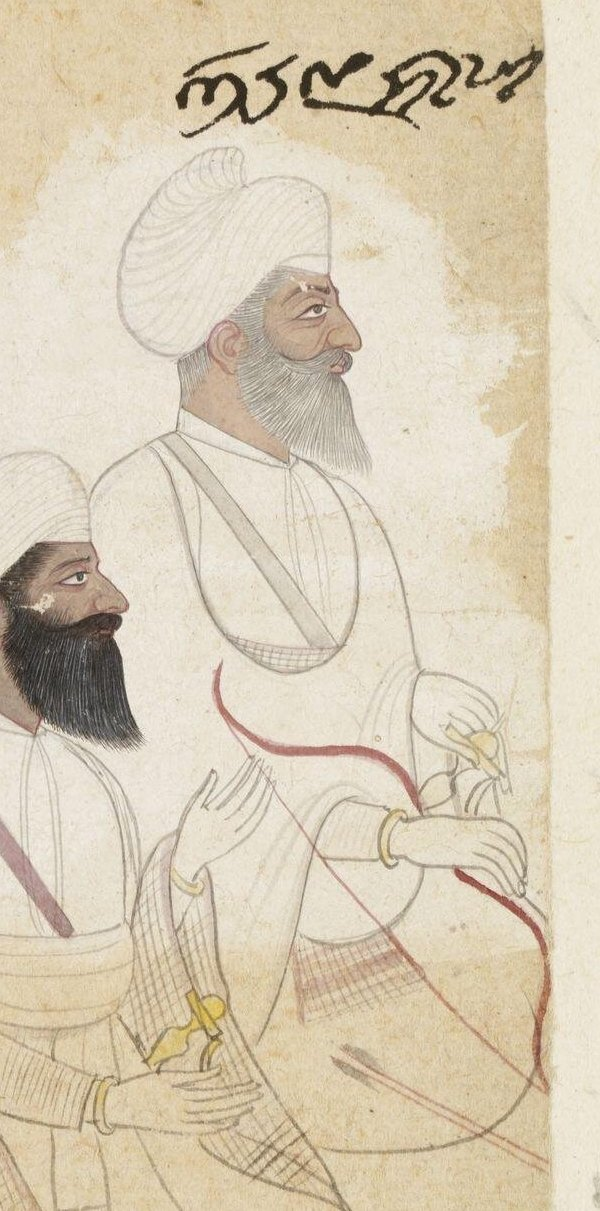
Detail of Lehna Singh Kahlon (grey beard) of the Bhangi Misl from a painting of three seated Sikh sardars, circa late 18th century

He was born into a Kahlon Jat family to a father named Dargaha. After a conflict with his biological father, he ran away from home and came across Gurbakhsh Singh of the Bhangi Misl at the village of Roranwala. Gurbakhsh Singh, who was without a male issue, adopted Lehna Singh. Later on 16 April 1765, alongside Gujjar Singh Bhangi of the Bhangi Misl and Sobha Singh of the Kahnhaiya Misl, they jointly attacked and conquered Lahore from the Afghan nominees Kabuli Mall and Amir Singh. They did not plunder the city after conquering it as it was the birthplace of Guru Ram Das, the fourth guru of the Sikhs. In December 1766, Ahmad Shah Durrani invaded the area and offered Lehna Singh governorship of the Punjab, which he declined. He and the two other sardars reoccupied the city of Lahore after Ahmad Shah left for Afghanistan. He lived in the citadel at Lahore Fort, and is also recorded as having a house and military cantonment in the area known as Shadman and Shah Jamal, but his house was subsequently knocked down to build the Lahore Central Jail. He ruled the city for 32 years until his death in September 1797, then the city was ruled by his son Chet from whom Maharaja Ranjit Singh, who was a distant relation, took the city in 1799.

== See also ==
- Sikh period in Lahore
- Indian campaign of Ahmad Shah Durrani
