= Chaj Doab =

Chaj Doab Jech Doab چَج دوآب
- Natural region
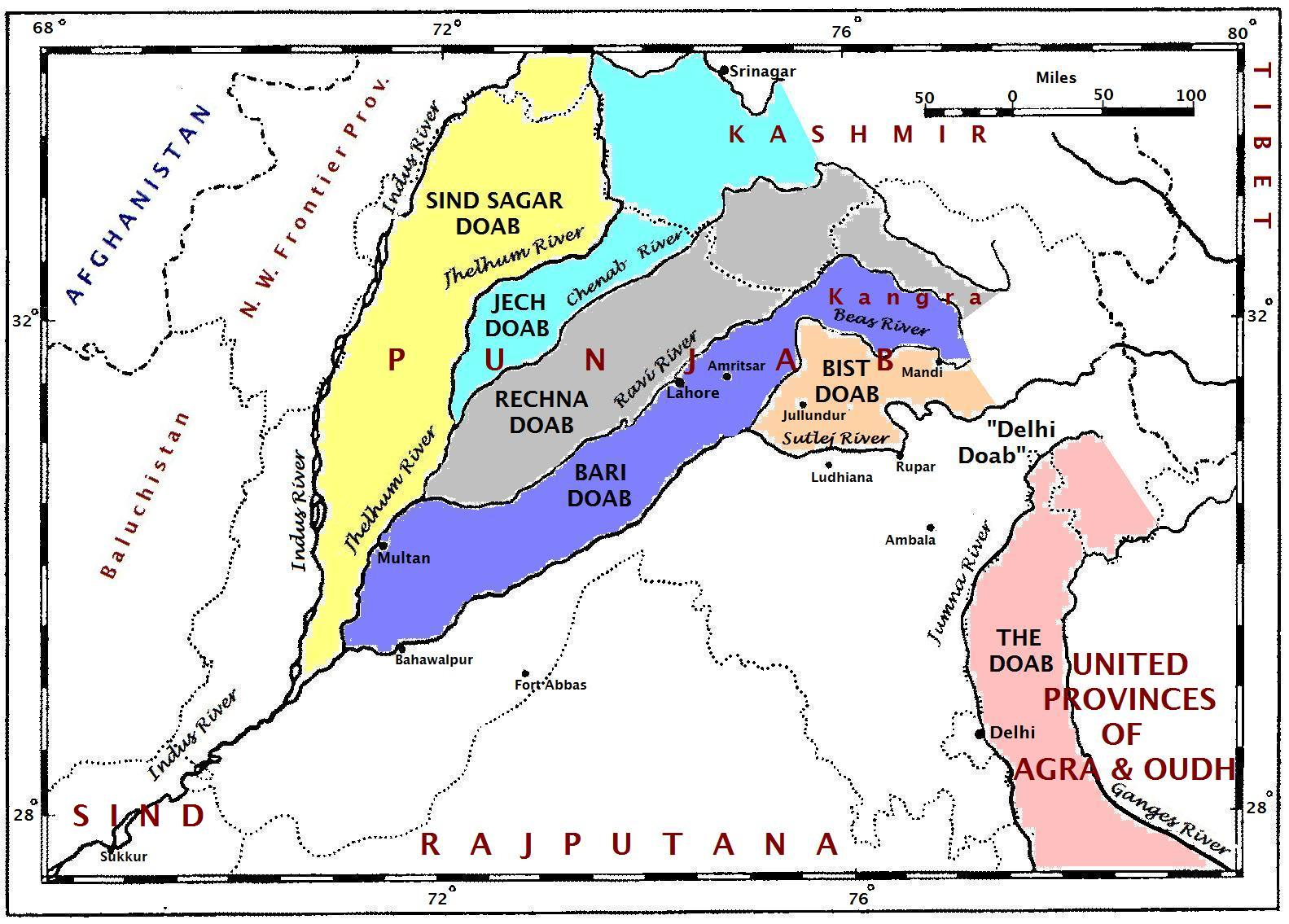
- View of different Doabs of Punjab
- Interactive map of Chaj Doab; Jech Doab
- Region: Punjab
- Subregion: Punjab, Pakistan

Area
  - Total: 27,000 km^{2} (10,000 sq mi)

Chaj Doab (Punjabi: چَج دوآب), also known as the Jech Doab (Gurmukhi: ਜੇਚ ਦੋਆਬ) is one of the main regions of the Punjab province in Pakistan. The doab lies between the Chenab and Jhelum rivers. Punjab historically has been divided into regions based on its various rivers, since the name Punjab itself is based on the region's five main rivers. The word Chaj (چَج) is combination of first Punjabi alphabet of Chenab (چناب) and Jhelum(جہلم), "Ch" چَ and "J" ج. The Chaj Doab includes the area between the Jhelum and Chenab rivers, thus also known as Jech Doab. It lies on the southern fringes of the Kashmir valley. The Chaj Doab is smaller in area compared to the other doabs, such as the Rachna, and it has a moderately high population density. Its principal city is Sargodha.

== Geography ==
The upper part of the doab has high-elevation. The middle and lower sections of the doab is not very conductive to agriculture when compared with Rechna Doab.

== Districts ==
This doab covers Gujrat District, Bhimber District, Mirpur District, Mandi Bahauddin District, Sargodha District, Lalian Tehsil of Chiniot District and some areas of Jhang Tehsil of Jhang District. However, the main districts are Gujrat, Mandi Bahauddin, and Sargodha.

== See also ==
- Sindh Sagar Doab
- Rachna Doab
- Bari Doab
