= Maratha–Sikh clashes =

Series of conflicts from 1766 to 1798

Date	March 1766 – March 1798
Location	India
Result	Sikh victory: Maratha failure to subdue the Cis-Sutlej states

Belligerents
Maratha Confederacy; Mughal Empire; Rohillas (till 1787)	Sikh Confederacy; Patiala state Rohillas(from 1787)

Commanders and leaders
Mahadaji Shinde; Rane Khan; George Thomas; Ambaji Ingle; Madho Rao Phalke; Bapu Malhar; Jivba 'Dada' Kerkar; Dhar Rao; Rayaji Patil; Devji Gavle; Shah Alam II; Ghulam Kadir (til 1787)	Sahib Singh of Patiala; Bibi Sahib Kaur; Raja Bhag Singh; Gurdat Singh; Tara Singh Ghaiba; Sahib Singh; Bhanga Singh of Thanesar; Ghulam Kadir (after 1787) (executed)

Strength
12,000	7,000–9,000

Casualties and losses
Unknown	Unknown

The Maratha–Sikh clashes of 1766–1798 were a series of intermittent conflicts between the Maratha Empire and the Sikh Confederacy, primarily in Northern India. These confrontations were concentrated in the Cis-Sutlej territories and the Upper Gangetic Doab.

Hostilities were largely initiated by the Sikhs, who sought to raid the Upper Doab and Delhi for plunder. Opposing them were the Marathas, who not only aimed to consolidate their northern dominions after their recovery from the defeat at Panipat in 1761 and to protect their Mughal puppet Emperor Shah Alam II from the Sikh raids but also extend their influence up to Satluj.

During the 1790s, women of the Patiala ruling-house, notably Rani Rajinder Kaur (d. 1791, cousin of Amar Singh) and Rani Sahib Kaur (d. 1799, sister of Sahib Singh) defended the political entity of Patiala from the Marathas through their leadership.

== Background ==
By the year 1769, The Sikh Misls came out triumphant in the Punjab. Ahmad Shah Durrani had largely withdrawn from northern India, leaving the Sikhs the leading power in the province. The Cis-Sutlej states, along with other Sikh generals, turned their attention to the east, hence the organization of raids into areas lying adjacent to and beyond the Yamuna River was made. These expansions put them into conflict with several powers, including the Jats, Rohillas, Mughals, and Marathas, and finally the British East India Company.

The Maratha Confederacy, which had been the strongest power in India until then, suffered a crushing defeat at the Third Battle of Panipat in 1761. By 1769, the confederacy had broken up into semi-independent states ruled by kings like the Sindhia of Gwalior and the Holkar of Indore, all nominally under allegiance to the Peshwa. The Peshwa Madhavrao I, nevertheless, tried to regain influence in northern India and therefore dispatched three generals Ram Chandra Ganesh, Mahadji Sindhia, and Tukoji Rao Holkar to further this goal. Under Mahadji Shinde's command, the Maratha army captured Delhi in 1771. Afterwards in 1772 another force was dispatched punish the Rohillas for their role at Panipat. They seized Najibabad and desecrated the grave of Rohilla chieftain Najib ad-Dawlah.

== Shinde's regency of Delhi ==
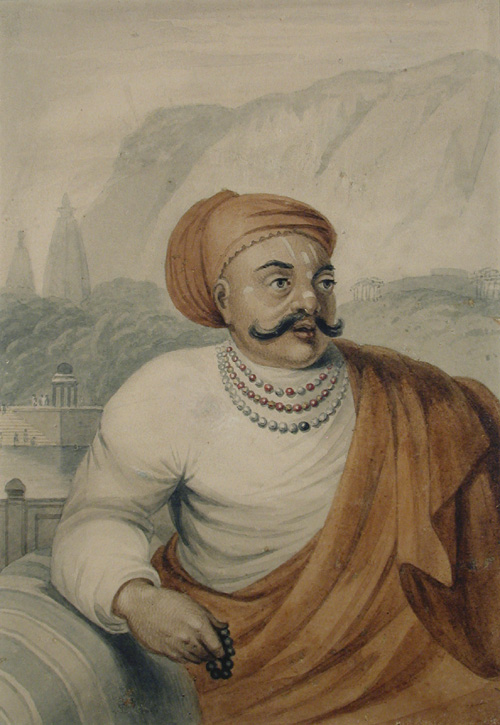
Portrait of Mahadaji Scindia

After years of anarchy in Delhi, the Mughal Emperor Shah Alam II tried to consolidate his position by naming Mahadji Scindia as Vakil-i-Mutlaq (regent) in November 1784. The nomination was done at Kanua, located close to Fatehpur Sikri, where Scindia demonstrated his loyalty by falling at the Emperor's feet, resting his head on Shah Alam's feet, and offering 101 gold mohurs. This symbolic act highlighted the formal restoration of Mughal authority, although in a nominal sense, for British observers noted that Scindia, while outwardly appearing to be a dutiful subordinate, actually exercised real power over the Emperor.

=== The Maratha-Sikh treaty of 1785 ===
Within days of his appointment as Vakil-i-Mutlaq (Plenipotentiary Regent) on 4 December 1784 a position that merged the offices of Wazir and Commander-in-Chief Mahadji Scindia was faced with a severe financial crisis. His main objective during this period was to give the Mughal Emperor a stable revenue and a clear territorial administration, securing thereby an area of absolute control. The attainment of this objective necessitated preventing invasions by the Rohillas and Sikhs who were a severe threat to the security of the capital and its neighboring regions.

In January 1785, Mahadji Scindia appointed his trusted lieutenant, Ambaji Ingle, to the post of faujdar for all the districts lying to the north of Delhi. This appointment was basically intended to safeguard the capital against the possible attacks of the Sikhs, who were considered a potent force at that time, as the Emperor was away, residing in Agra.

On 1 February 1785, after the pillaging of Chandausi by the Dal Khalsa on 15 January, the Sikh forces encamped on the bank of the Ganga River, opposite the Sabalgarh Ghat. Meanwhile, Ambaji Ingle arrived with letters from the Macheri chief and Raju Mall, vakil of Sardar Baghel Singh. These communications clarified the tensions that arose from Scindia's attempts to reinstate the jagirs of the Mughal chiefs, a policy that led to strong opposition from both the chiefs and the Sikh leaders. A British dispatch, dated 23 March 1785, revealed that the rumours of a projected alliance among the discontented Mughal chiefs, the Sikhs, and the rulers of Jaipur and Marwar brought the situation to a head. Ambaji sought the help of Sawai Pratap Singh Naruka to mediate a reconciliation with the Khalsa because he was afraid of the Sikhs ongoing vengeance and eventual humiliation, which may put him to shame in the eyes of his master, Mahadji Sindhia.

The first agreement reached between Mahadji Sindhia's agent, Ambaji Ingle, and the Sikh Dal Khalsa on 31 March 1785 formed the basis for a treaty of alliance. However, wrangles over the terms and Sindhia's subsequent actions made a fresh treaty necessary. The Definitive Treaty of May 10, 1785, ratified in Sindhia's camp, laid out clearer terms and commitments to ratify the alliance:

1. The Sikhs were granted a jagir worth 10 lakh rupees annually, divided between the Karnal region and other areas under Maratha control. This jagir was meant to sustain a Sikh cavalry force of 5,000 troops.
2. The Sikh chiefs agreed to provide military support to Sindhia's campaigns while refraining from collecting rakhi within the Maratha-controlled territories.
3. The Sikhs were explicitly barred from interfering in the domains of the British East India Company and the Nawab Vizir of Oudh. Sindhia, in turn, affirmed his friendship with these powers.
4. If the revenue from the jagir proved insufficient, the Maratha government pledged to compensate the difference.
5. Both parties declared a commitment to mutual support, pledging unity in suppressing any rebellion or disturbances.

Soon after the treaty was signed, tensions arose between the Marathas and the Sikhs as the latter showed reluctance to adhere to its provisions. On the next day, James Anderson, the representative of Britain, informed the Governor-General that there was "little probability of a sincere union taking place between the Mahrattas and the Seiks."

=== Renewed hostilities ===
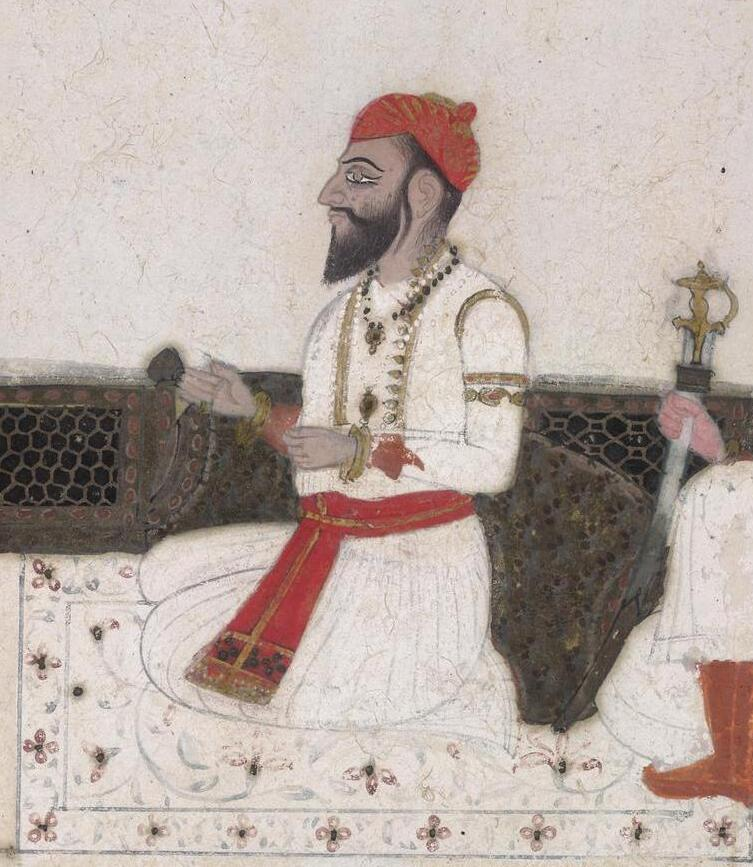
Sahib Singh of Patiala State

The alliance between the Sikhs and the Marathas was short-lived. The Sikhs entered the Doab early in June and started collecting rakhi at a cost of two annas in revenue rupees. Dhar Rao went on to repulse the Sikhs from Meerut, although he was not successful. In December 1786, the Sikhs defeated the Marathas, weakening their influence along the Awadh frontier. Following this, Sikh military activities across the Sutlej River became more frequent.

In December 1785, Khushal Singh of the Singhpuria Misl took control of several places, including the Raja of Patiala's Chhat and Banur. To ask Mahadji Sindhia for assistance, Raja Sahib Singh of Patiala assigned Diwan Nanumal. He presented a gift of three lakh rupees, a supply of ammunition, and Rs. 5,000 for daily costs. The Raja needed Dhar Rao's assistance. Khushal Singh retreated back into the Jullundur Doab and Dhar Rao reclaimed all the areas he had taken.

=== Sikh-Rohilla Alliance ===
Ghulam Kadir broke away from Sindhia's allegiance and mobilized his army to conquer Maratha territories. He negotiated with Sikh leaders and offered Begum Samru an extension of her jagir and administration role in exchange for her allegiance. Despite concerns from Maratha commander Bakhshi Shyam Rao, Ghulam Kadir continued his march towards Delhi, attracting Sikh support.

On August 21, 1787, Ghulam Kadir was present at Baghpat and subsequently appeared opposite Delhi along the banks of the Jamuna River on August 23. A contingent of Sikhs had already allied with him, and reports suggested that Ghulam Kadir and the Sikhs engaged in conflict with the imperial guards, emerging victorious. In reaction to this development, Madho Rao Phalke, the Maratha chieftain, was sent to confront them at Shahdara. The ensuing battle resulted in many casualties, with some drowned in the river and others killed or wounded. Shah Nizam-ud-din and Deshmukh observed the fighting from the Diwan-e-Khas and attempted to disrupt the Sikhs by firing upon them for two hours. When the Sikhs approached their position, they withdrew. Meanwhile, soldiers looted carts filled with cash and goods. Phalke retreated into the Shahdara fort, eventually surrendering. Deshmukh left Delhi the same night with 500 Marathas and marched towards Deeg by the road of Ballabgarh. Shah Nizam-ud-din also decided to withdraw and in their hasty flight a good deal of their baggage was pillaged in the route from Firoz Shah's mansion to the Western Serai.

Ghulam Kadir overthrew Shah Alams II's rule in Delhi in August 1788 after capturing it. When Rane Khan recaptured Delhi in October 1788 (October 11, 1788), Mahadji quickly recovered his lost prominence. Ghulam Kadir made every effort to resist, but it was ineffective. Finally, on March 3, 1789, he was chased down, taken prisoner, blinded, and killed.

=== Maratha Invasion of Cis-Sutlej region ===
When Ghulam Kadir was captured, his mother, wife, and brother fled across the Jamuna River to seek refuge under the Khalsa, who provided them with protection. Declaring the ladies innocent of Ghulam Kadir's misdeeds, the Sikh leaders provided them with sanctuary. However, Mahadji Sindhia was outraged at the protection they received because, in his opinion, the riches taken from Ghausgarh belonged to the conqueror. As a result, he organized an invasion against the Sikhs. By the end of December 1788, he had deployed Rane Khan, Ali Bahadur, Keshi Rao, and several more to Kunjpura across the Jamuna River, threatening to conquer Patiala. Its Diwan, Nanu Mall, bought a short-term peace from the Marathas for fifty thousand rupees.

The other Sikh chiefs were extremely alarmed by the Marathas' danger, therefore Sardar Baghel Singh Karorsinghia invited the Dal Khalsa from across the Sutlej River. Sardar Bhanga Singh defeated the Marathas as they marched up to Thanesar, forcing them to flee. In April 1789, Tara Singh Ghaiba and others repulsed an advanced guard from Kashi Rao and Bapuji Ingle. Bibi Rajindar Kaur rejected the offer when Diwan Nanu Mall of Patiala attempted to buy off the Marathas, viewing the Diwan's appeasement strategy as a sign of treachery. Diwan Nanu Mall therefore turned to the Marathas, and Jiwa Dada Bakhshi led a sizable Maratha army in their assault against the settlement of Soohlar. However Bibi Rajindar Kaur repulsed this assault.

After that, the Marathas marched on Saifabad, where Gulab Kali's fort at Bahadurgarh (Saifabad) resisted the siege for several months without any success for the Marathas. Negotiations ultimately resulted in an agreement that Bibi Rajindar Kaur would meet Mahadji Sindhia in Mathura to settle the Patiala tribute dispute. Bibi Rajindar Kaur was present as the Marathas began their return march. In the end, the Maratha mission failed to achieve its goal since it was unable to conquer Patiala or secure a lasting tribute. After returning to Patiala in 1790, Bibi Rajindar Kaur died in 1791.

In 1790 and 1791, the Marathas made two further unsuccessful attempts to regain their lost prestige. The first attempt, in May 1790, was led by Devji Gavel and Bapuji Malhar, and the second took place towards the close of 1791 under Gopal Rao Raghunath. But neither of these expeditions produced any notable results. By this time, the Maratha raids had become a matter of routine for the Sikh chiefs, and their threat was no longer taken seriously.

Mahadji Sindhia died on 12 February 1794, at Poona.

== List of major battles ==
Maratha victory	Sikh victory

The table below lists some of the major military conflicts of Marathas and Sikhs.

Year	Conflicts	Marathas Commander	Sikh Commander	Locations	Result
1781 CE	Siege of Kakripur	Murtaza Khan and Bagha Rao	Unknown	Kakripur	Murtaza Khan requested local assistance against Sikhs on April 30. Sikhs raided the region, briefly attacked his camp, and then withdrew after defeating Maratha troops and seizing booty.
1785 CE	Battle of Merut	Bapu Malhar	Unknown	Delhi	Marathas defeated the force of Sikhs invited by Najaf Quli Khan to raid Delhi.
1785 CE	Second Battle of Merut	Dhar Rao	Unknown	Meerut	Dhar Rao tasked to expel Sikhs from Meerut but does not achieve success.
1785 CE	Battle of Panipat	Ambaji Ingle	Unknown	Panipat	A battalion of Marathas stationed at Panipat was completely cut off when a force of 20,000 Sikhs stormed the town, pillaged, and set it on fire.
1786 CE	Battle of Banur	Dhar rao	Unknown	Punjab	Sikhs got repulsed in the invasion of marathas who marched against the Raja of Patiala.
1787 CE	Battle of Sonipat	Ambaji Ingle	Unknown	Sonipat	In April a Sikh contingent ravaged the territory of Sonipat, but a body of Marathas attacked them, seized some of the horses, and drove them away.
1787 CE	Battle of Shahdara	Madho Rao Phalke	Ghulam Qadir and Sikh Raiders	Shahdara	On 23rd August, Ghulam Qadir and the Sikhs defeated imperial guards near Delhi. Phalke fought them but then retreated, and Deshmukh and Nizam-ud-din fled, losing baggage.
1789 CE	Battle of Thanesar	Kashi Rao and Baluji Ingle	Bhanga Singh of Thanesar and Tara Singh Ghaiba	Thanesar	The Marathas moved on to Thanesar. However, they were tormented by Sardar Bhanga Singh and forced to leave his territory. Rane Khan had dispatched an advanced guard comprising Kashi Rao and Baluji Ingle. Tara Singh Ghaiba fought and pushed this force back in April 1789.
1789 CE	Battle of Soohlar	Jiwbaa Dada Kerkar	Rani Rajinder Kaur	Near Patiala	Under the command of Jiwa Dada Bakhshi, a formidable army of over thirty thousand Maratha horsemen and foot marched to the village of Soohlar. But the princess of Patiala stayed firm. Unable to extract tribute from her, the Marathas retreated to Saifabad.
1789 CE	Battle of Saifabad	Rane Khan	Gulab Kali	Bahadurgarh fort	After occasional skirmishes between the Marathas and the Patiala forces for a month and a half the Maratha forces were defeated by Sikh troops and rest of them retired to Delhi.
1793 CE	Battle of Meerut	Bapu Malhar's troops	Unknown	Near Meerut & Doab	From Khurja, Bapu Malhar sent a force of 2,000 horse to set up a Maratha post at Meerut. They were attacked by the Sikhs who looted their camp, and the Marathas fled back to Bapu Malhar. Bapuji Malhar then with 5000 troops attacked Sikhs and made them flee.
1793 CE	Battle of Doab	Bapu Malhar	Unknown	Doab	Bapu Malhar routed Sikh forces near Doab and killed 50 Sikhs. The defeated Sikhs fled to Patiala.
1793 CE	Battle of Karnal	Devi Datta	Gurdat Singh	Karnal	Devi Datta twice routed Sikh forces led by Gudrat Singh and expelled them from territory.
1793 CE	Battle of Delhi	Khanderao Hari	Unknown	Delhi	Khanderao Hari successfully repulsed the Sikhs contingent which was ravaging Delhi
1794 CE	Battle of Mardanpur	Lakshmi Rao	Bibi Sahib Kaur	Patiala	During the night the Sikhs made a surprise attack on Madho Rao who was busy performing the funerary rites of his dead soldiers. Following another attack by the Sikhs before dawn, the Marathas retired to Karnal.
1795 CE	Nana Rao's Expedition	Nana Rao	Bhanga Singh of Thenaser	Rajpura	Nana Rao launched an expedition against them in September 1795. Nana Rao marched to Thanesar, where Bhanga Singh fought with him. He was involved in many conflicts near Rajpura, on the banks of the Ghaggar River. Nana Rao was forced to flee to Panipat.
1795 CE	Battle of Saharanpur	Nana Rao	Unknown	Doab	Nana Rao arrived at Panipat, where 5,000 Sikhs attacked the Gangetic Doab, scattered the Maratha garrison at Saharanpur, and destroyed Maratha troops stationed for the province's defense.
1795 CE	Battle of Muzaffarnagar	Bapu Malhar	Unknown	Doab & Muzaffarnagar	On 12 November 1795, a fight took place between Bapu Malhar and the Sikhs. Many people were killed and wounded on both sides. On the 15th another action was fought between them in which Bapuji was defeated.
1796 CE	Second Battle of Saharanpur	Bapu Malhar	Unknown	Doab	In March 1796, the Sikhs again invaded the Doab. Bapu Malhar, the Maratha officer in Saharanpur, attempted to halt their march but was defeated and stripped of four cannons on March 20, 1796.
1798 CE	Second Battle of Karnal	George Thomas	Rebellion Sikhs	Karnal	Thomas (Irish general under Marathas) fought a battle against the Sikhs, in which the Marathas suffered 500 deaths and killed 1000 Sikhs who tried to rebel against the Marathas. Peace was later achieved with the Sikhs evacuating the place.
1798 CE	Third Battle of Saharanpur	Madho Rao Phalke	Unknown	Doab	In March 1798, Madho Rao Phalke faced Sikh invaders in Saharanpur, with Jaguji's assistant having an advantage. Sikhs continued, leading the Maratha soldiers to flee the Battlefield to Saharanpur.
