= Ranjit Singh's first Cis-Sutlej campaign =

- Part of Ranjit Singh's campaigns in the Cis-Sutlej region
Date	26 July – 10 November 1806
Location	Cis-Sutlej region
Result	Ranjit Singh's victory: Cis-Sutlej chiefs acknowledged his supremacy
Territorial changes	Raikot estate seized and redistributed; Ludhiana, Jandiala, Jagraon, Talwandi and Ghungrana seized.

Belligerents
Sikh Empire; Allied Cis-Sutlej chiefs	Patiala; Raikot

Commanders and leaders
Ranjit Singh; Diwan Mohkam Chand; Fateh Singh Ahluwalia; Gurdit Singh of Ladwa; Bhag Singh of Jind; Jaswant Singh of Nabha	Sahib Singh of Patiala; Rani Aus Kaur of Patiala; Nur-ul-Nisa of Raikot; Lachhmi of Raikot; Gujar Singh of Rahon

Strength
20,000 troops 30,000 horse	Unknown

Casualties and losses
Unknown	Unknown

Ranjit Singh's first Cis-Sutlej campaign, also known as his First Malwa campaign, was an expedition by Ranjit Singh into the Cis-Sutlej region in 1806. It began on 26 July, when Ranjit Singh crossed the Sutlej, and ended with his return across the river on 10 November. His force included 20,000 troops under Diwan Mohkam Chand, with Fateh Singh Ahluwalia of Kapurthala and Gurdit Singh of Ladwa in attendance.

The campaign followed a dispute between Patiala and Nabha over Doladhi, a village near Nabha. Bhag Singh of Jind invited Ranjit Singh to intervene on behalf of Jaswant Singh of Nabha. Ranjit Singh reached Nabha on 28 July and presided over a conference of Cis-Sutlej chiefs.

After the Doladhi settlement, Ranjit Singh moved through the region, received nazarana from local chiefs, seized the Raikot estate from the widows of Rai Ilyas Khan, and distributed several territories among his supporters. British officials monitored his movements, reinforced the cantonment at Karnal, and received assurances that he did not intend hostilities against the Company.

== Background ==
After the departure of Lord Lake from Punjab, tensions resumed between Raja Sahib Singh of Patiala and Rani Aus Kaur. Aus Kaur controlled Patiala, while Sahib Singh resided at Sunam. The murder of Bhai Tara Singh, thanadar of Mansurpur, a Patiala village near Nabha, intensified the dispute. Aus Kaur suspected Jaswant Singh of Nabha, moved to Mansurpur, defeated the combined forces of Nabha and Jind, and occupied Doladhi village.

The Doladhi dispute was connected with internal rivalry in Patiala. Sahib Singh had appointed his sister Sahib Kaur as chief minister in 1793 after Diwan Nanumal lost power and property. Sahib Kaur's authority was later broken by Aus Kaur and court favourites, and she was confined in Patiala fort. Aus Kaur then quarrelled with Sahib Singh, and the dispute took a sharper form in 1806 over Doladhi.

Patiala forces, supported by contingents from Kaithal and Thanesar, defeated the ruler of Nabha at Nirwana. Bhag Singh of Jind then invited Ranjit Singh to mediate in the Nabha–Patiala dispute. Ranjit Singh accepted the invitation and crossed the Sutlej.

== Crossing of the Sutlej ==
Ranjit Singh crossed the Sutlej on 26 July 1806 with a large force and his principal sardars. He reached Nabha on 28 July.

Doladhi was first given to Nabha. Sahib Singh joined Aus Kaur in an attempt to recover the village, but they were repulsed. A conference was then held to settle the dispute. Chiefs from Jind, Kaithal, Kapurthala, Ladwa, Nabha, Patiala, Thanesar and other states attended, with Ranjit Singh presiding. The reported settlement differs between Historians. (Note: Hari Ram Gupta says that Doladhi was restored to Patiala and that Jaswant Singh of Nabha paid Ranjit Singh Rs. 50,000, two elephants, 100 horses and one cannon, while Bhag Singh gave him two elephants. Hasrat writes that Doladhi was restored to Jaswant Singh of Nabha and that an indemnity was imposed on Sahib Singh of Patiala.)

== Campaign in the Cis-Sutlej region ==
After the Doladhi affair, Ranjit Singh moved through the Cis-Sutlej region. Jaswant Singh of Nabha, Bhag Singh of Jind, Gurdit Singh of Ladwa, Fateh Singh Ahluwalia, Basawa Singh, Bhagel Singh of Thanesar, Garbha Singh and other Cis-Sutlej chiefs accompanied him. The chiefs offered nazarana and acknowledged his supremacy.

In September 1806, after the Patiala dispute had quieted, Bhag Singh led Ranjit Singh to Badrukhan, his birthplace. Ranjit Singh also bathed in the holy tank at Thanesar. He did not advance farther south than Ambala and Thanesar.

=== Conquest of Raikot ===
Ranjit Singh then marched to Raikot against the Kalha family, which held Raikot, Ludhiana, Jandiala, Jagraon, Talwandi and neighbouring districts. Nur-ul-Nisa and Lachhmi, the widows of Rai Ilyas Khan of Raikot, were dispossessed of an estate recorded as 318 villages in one passage and 311 villages in another. They received two villages for maintenance. The movable property of the Raikot family was also seized.

The seized territories were distributed among chiefs and allies. Ludhiana was given to Bhag Singh of Jind. Bhag Singh also received Ludhiana, Jandiala, Jagraon and Basia, with annual revenue of Rs. 23,260. Gurdit Singh of Ladwa received Baddowal and 32 villages of Jagraon, with annual revenue of Rs. 23,540. Jaswant Singh of Nabha received 31 villages in Kot Basia, Talwandi and Jagraon, with annual revenue of Rs. 26,690.

Fateh Singh Ahluwalia received 106 villages in Dhaka, Kot Basia, Jagraon and Talwandi, worth Rs. 40,505 annually. Diwan Mohkam Chand received 71 villages in the same districts, with annual revenue of Rs. 33,945. Basawa Singh and Bhanga Singh also received shares.

During the return march, Ranjit Singh seized 12 villages of Ghungrana from Gujar Singh, son of Tara Singh of Rahon, and collected Rs. 12,000 from him. Sanehwal was taken from the widow of Sudha Singh and restored after a nazarana of Rs. 30,000. The Ghungrana taluqa was divided between Jaswant Singh of Nabha and Gurdit Singh of Ladwa.

== British reaction ==
Ranjit Singh's approach toward Karnal alarmed British officials. The Resident at Delhi asked Bhag Singh of Jind for an explanation and received assurances that Ranjit Singh had come only to settle the Doladhi dispute. The British strengthened the cantonment at Karnal.

On 2 November 1806, Ranjit Singh sent assurances of friendship to Mr. Seton, the British Resident at Delhi. He referred to existing relations with the Company through General Lake and requested friendly correspondence. The British did not treat the expedition as an immediate hostile act, partly because the Nabha and Jind rulers had presented it as an intervention in a local dispute. The Resident received reports on Ranjit Singh's movements from the Jind ruler and British military commanders at Karnal, Rewan and Saharanpur.

Reports on 4 November suggested that Ranjit Singh might be moving toward the Ganges under the pretext of ritual bathing and might intend to plunder exposed British possessions. Bhagwan Singh of Buna urged the Resident to protect the upper Doab. The British reply stated that no differences existed with Ranjit Singh and that no hostile intention was apprehended from him.

== Return ==
Ranjit Singh recrossed the Sutlej on 10 November 1806. The expedition had lasted three and a half months. During the march to Patiala and back, he brought a large number of villages and territories in the Cis-Sutlej region under his control.

== Bibliography ==
- Gupta, Hari Ram (1978). History of the Sikhs: The Sikh Lion of Lahore, Maharaja Ranjit Singh, 1799–1839. History of the Sikhs. Vol. 5 (3rd, illustrated ed.). Munshiram Manoharlal. ISBN 9788121505154.
- Hasrat, Bikrama Jit (1977). Life and Times of Ranjit Singh: A Saga of Benevolent Despotism. V. V. Research Institute Book Agency.
- Hasrat, Bikrama Jit (1968). Anglo-Sikh Relations, 1799–1849: A Reappraisal of the Rise and Fall of the Sikhs. V. V. Research Institute Book Agency.
- Singh, Ajmer (1997). Military Campaigns of Maharaja Ranjit Singh and Under His Successors (PDF) (PhD thesis). Panjab University Chandigarh.
