= Jiva Dada Bakshi =

- Raje Bahadur; Bakshi
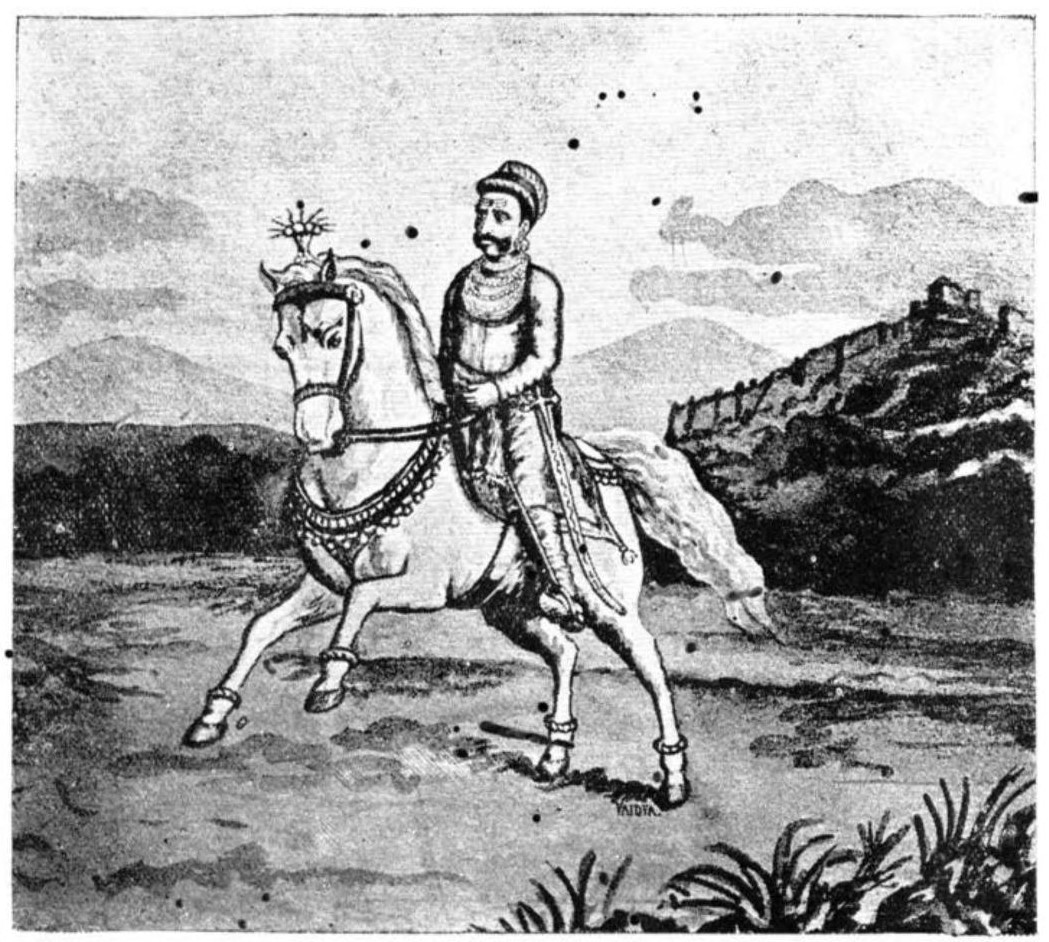

Commander-in-chief of Gwalior State
- Reign: 1765–1796
- Predecessor: Position Established
- Successor: Sarje Rao Ghadge
- Died: 1796
- Issue: Narayan Rao Bakshi; Jaswant Rao Bhau
- Allegiance: Maratha Empire
- Monarch: Mahadaji Scindia; Daulatrao Scindia
- Religion: Hinduism
- Military career
- Conflicts: Maratha–Nizam War: Battle of Kharda; Afghan–Maratha War: Capture of Delhi; Anglo–Maratha Wars: Battle of Wadgaon

Bakshi Bahadur Jivaji Ballal, or Jivba Dada Kerkar, was a Saraswat Brahmin and the commander-in-chief of the army under Mahadji Scindia of Gwalior. He spent some of his early years in Malgaon, where his sister was settled.

== Early life ==
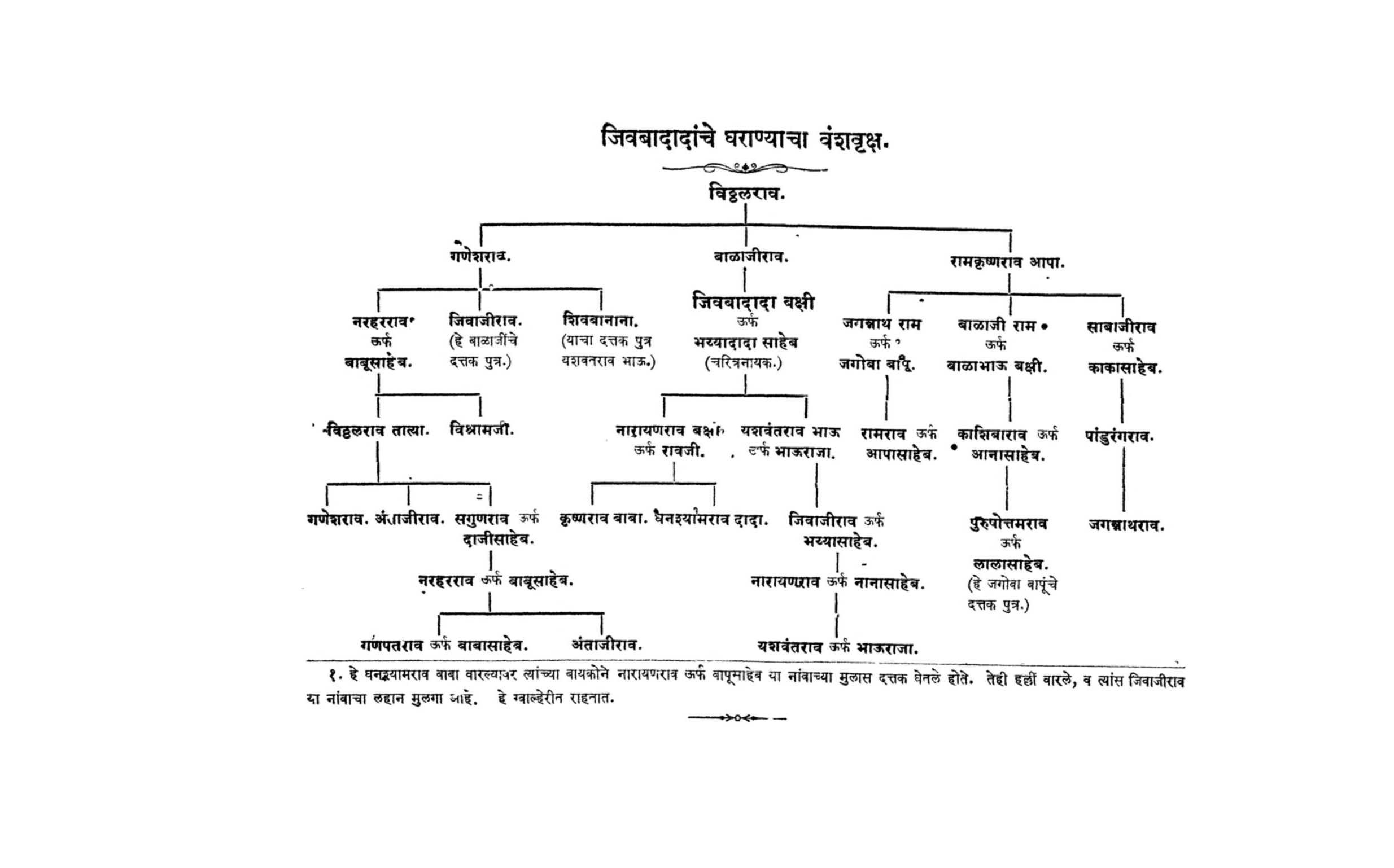
Family tree of Jivaba Dada Bakshi

== Under Mahadaji ==
=== Raid on Jaipur ===
Nana Fadnis committed himself to provide a sum of five lakh rupees and an army commanded by Ali Bahadur I and Tukoji Holkar. Mahadaji Shinde was really pleased, and the occasion was marked with celebratory cannon fire. However, because of heavy rains, Mahadaji Shinde could not recruit fresh soldiers. Meanwhile, Ambuji Ingale and Jiva Dada Bakshi raided around the areas near Jaipur.

=== Siege of Agra (1788) ===
On April 4, 1788, a large army under the command of Rane Khan was dispatched against Ismail Beg towards Agra. The force comprised 10,000 soldiers, with two battalions led by De Boigne. The crossing of the river was done by Rane Khan and Jiva Dada Bakshi along a path not known. The Ranjit Singh Jat forces joined them en route. This united army engaged Ismail Beg near Agra Fort and completely trounced him on April 7, 1788.

=== Capture of Delhi ===
Combined forces of Rane Khan and Jiva Dada Bakshi invaded Delhi on October 2, 1788. They laid siege to the Red Fort attacking with cannons. The fort fell to these forces on October 11, 1788, and the blind Mughal emperor, Shah Alam II, was restored to the throne. Gulam Kader crossed the Yamuna River on October 20, 1788.

=== Battle of Lakheri (1793) ===
On June 1, 1793, a battle was fought between Scindia and Holkar at Lakheri. As 30,000 Holkar troops filed into the pass, Benoit de Boigne made them feel the weight of his attack. Combined with the leadership of Jiva Dada, the planning caused to be overshadowed the power and might of the Holkar army. The commander Dudranck made his stand, but all his European officers were killed. Mahadaji Scindia took 37 guns and clinched a decisive victory.

== Under Daulatrao ==
=== Battle of Kharda (1795) ===
The forces of the Nizam, commanded by Assud AlI and assisted by French commander Michel Raymond, fought with the Marathas, led by Parshuram Bhau, Scindia, and Holkar. The Nizam had 17,000 troops, while the Marathas deployed a far greater force of 83,000 cavalry, 38,000 infantry, and 192 cannons.

Early in the battle, Lal Khan crashed Parshuram Bhau, but he was killed by Hari Pant. Following Raymond, the infantry charged, but Jiva Dada Kerkar counterattacked skillfully, and the Nizam troops were driven to Kharda Fort.

== Legacy ==
Bakshi helped him as an able and trusted adviser to Mahadaji Shinde. He served directly under Daulatrao Scindia during the Battle of Kharda, where he demonstrated conspicuous bravery. His death provided an opportunity for British diplomats to exploit divisions in the Maratha Confederacy and persuade Balloba to oppose Nana's plans for adoption. British historian Grant Duff reported that the British seized on this opportunity to re-establish a weakened Baji Rao II on the throne.
