= Madhogarh, Haryana =

Madhogarh
- Village
- Location in Haryana, India Madhogarh (India)
- Coordinates: 28°18′20″N 76°2′10″E
- Country: India
- State: Haryana
- District: Mahendragarh district

Government
  - Type: Local government
  - Body: Panchayat

Languages
  - Official: Hindi
- Time zone: UTC+5:30 (IST)
- PIN: 123024
- ISO 3166 code: IN-HR
- Vehicle registration: HR
- Sex ratio: ♂/♀
- Website: haryana.gov.in

Madhogarh is a village in Mahendragarh district, Haryana, India. It is located at the foot of Madhogarh Hill of Aravalli Mountain Range. Madhogarh Fort is on top of the hill.

== Location ==
The village is located 13 km from Mahendragarh city and 35 km from the district headquarters at Narnaul and 326 km from the state capital, Chandigarh. It also lies on the Mahendragarh-Satnali road.

== History ==
Rao Shekha, a Shekhawat rajput (sub-branch of Kachwaha or Kushwaha), was the founder of Shekhawati, who originally divided Shekhawati into 33 Thikana (also called a Pargana), each styled as Thakur with at least a 'kutcha' mud fort, some of which were fortified further with stone. After him, additional thikanas were granted to the descendants of subsequent generations.

- Loharu Thikana, Loharu was founded as 33rd Thikana in the year 1588 A.D by the Thakur Narhar Das, a decedent of Rao Shekha.
- Mahendragarh Thikana, was granted by Maharaja Mukund Singh of Shekhawati in 1868 to Kunwar Sheonath Singh I, the son of Maharaja Raj Singh II.
- Tosham Thikana, It was granted as a thikana by Shekhawati ruler Maharaja Mukund Singh in 1870 to Kunwar Abhaya Singh.
- Madhogarh Thikana and fort were founded by Madho Singh I in the first half of the 18th century when he placed the area under the control of Balwant Singh. The fort is named after Madho Singh I; "Madhogarh" literally means "the fort of Madho". Around 1755, this area passed from the Rajputs to the Maratha Empire under Maharaja Khande Rao Holkar of Indore when he attacked the independent Mughal chieftain Ismail Beg, Ismail Beg escaped to Madhogarh and established a post near Madhogarh fort. Khande Rao Holkar attacked Madhogargh fort and captured it on 16 February 1792. Ismail Beg escaped and attacked Kanud when the ruling wife of already deceased Nawab Najaf Quli Khan had died. Khande Rao Holkar then attacked Kanud and captured Ismail Beg, imprisoned him at Agra Fort and put him to death in 1794. Maratha Maharaj Mahadaji Shinde (Scindia) of Gwalior had conquered Rania, Fatehabad and Sirsa from Hissar governor. Haryana came under Maratha Empire. Mahad ji divided Haryana in four territories: Delhi (Mughal emperor Shah Alam II, his family and areas surrounding Delhi), Panipat (Kernal, Sonepat, Kurukshetra and Ambala), Hisar (Hisar, Sirsa, Fatehabad, parts of Rohtak), Mewat (Gurugaon, Rewari, Narnaul, Mahendragarh). Daulat Rao Scindia ceded Haryana on 30 December 1803 under the Treaty of Surji-Anjangaon to British East India Company's Company rule in India.

Madhogarh has faced water scarcity since 1978. In 2017, the BJP government ensured water supply in the canal after a gap of 29 years.

== Future development ==
The Government of Haryana has plans to develop an integrated tourist resort incorporating the Madhogarh Fort. In January 2018, Indian Railway prepared a proposal to develop an 8.8-hectare (22-acre) railway heritage theme park adjacent to the Rewari Railway Heritage Museum. It will be built in collaboration with the Government of Haryana and India's Ministry of Tourism on similar concept as Devon Railway Centre in UK, Edaville Railroad Theme Park in USA and Ferrymead Heritage Park in New Zealand. Railway has requested Haryana Government to include this heritage museum in the state subsidised "Swadesh Darshan scheme" under the under-development Madhogarh-Mahendragarh-Narnaul-Rewari heritage circuit of the Tourism Ministry being implemented at the cost of INR1.47 billion (INR147 crore or US$23 million).

== See also ==
- Nangal Sirohi
