= Kharda =

Human settlement in India

Kharda(Shivpattan) is a township in the Indian state of Maharashtra. It lies near Ahmednagar District’s south-eastern border with Osmanabad District and Beed District, and is 18 km south-east of Patoda. Rajuri is 17 km north-west, while Int is 13 km towards the south-east. Ahmednagar is around 100 km north-west. Kharda is well connected to the taluka headquarters of Jamkhed via road. Kharde-patils who now belong to Kolhar of Rahata Taluk, Ahmednagar District find their roots to this place. Surve, who are one of the 96k, migrated to Kharda, later on came to be known as Kharde.

== Kharda fort ==
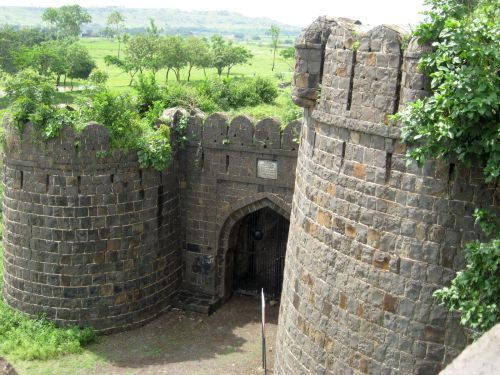
Entrance gate to the Kharda Fort

A historical fort at Kharda is a tourist attraction. It commemorates the Battle of Kharda fought in March 1795 between the Maratha Confederacy under the Peshwa of Pune and the Nizam of Hyderabad. The Nizam was defeated in the battle and was Maratha's last battle. The fort is at ground level and still in good condition.

A compromise between the Maratha empire and the Mughals took place at Shingave Naik under Maratha Sardar The Grand son of Bahirji Naik i.e. Sardar Tukoji naik. Actual place is a Wada or military headquarters of Maratha Sardar- Shrimant Tukoji Naik's Residence. After the Taha or Compromise, Sardar Tukoji Build a Ram Mandir in Shingave Naik within the military headquarters area which is also present there. This symbolised the victory of the Marathas over the Mughals. Shingave Naik is 22 km from Ahmednagar District on Nagar - Shirdi Road.

== Attractions ==
=== Nanasahebanchi Chhatri ===
There is memorial temple built and carved in the stones such like as the Kailasa Temple at Ellora. This temple is the memory of Pant Nanasaheb Nimbalkar, situated to northern side of the village, at the shore of the river-Kautuka.

=== Kanifnath ===
There is also a hill temple of Kanifnath with more than 400 stairs to get on the hill. The stairs are built with carved stones. On the hill there is a watching place called 'Tehelani Ghar'. From that sight everyone can see the circular area more than 7 km. The fair of Kanifnath called 'Kanobachi jatra' held every year on the day of Holi.

== Economy ==
Kharda is now a village but during Peshwa rule times it used to be one of the major towns of Ahmednagar. It was also the trading hub of goods between the districts Ahemednagar, Beed, Osmanabad and Solapur, Dewas.

Saree weaving was a popular business in 1800 and 1900.

== Notable people ==
Kharda is the birthplace of famous Marathi writer Bhagwan Ingale, who has written Dhor an autobiography which won the Maharashtra State Best Literature (Marathi) award in the year 1999.
