= Battle of Kharda =

1795 battle between Nizam and Maratha Confederacy in Western India

Coordinates: 25.432036°N 73.458248°E

- Part of the Maratha-Nizam War
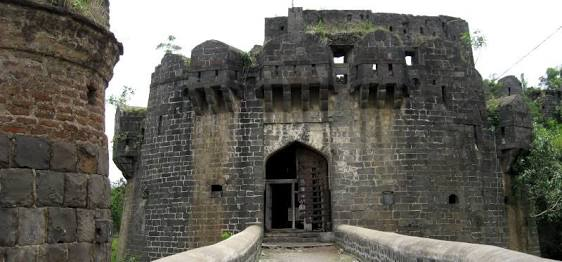
- Image of the Fort of the Kharda
Date	11 March 1795
Location	Kharda (modern-day Maharashtra)
Result	Maratha Empire victory; Ban of cow slaughter in the Deccan.
Territorial changes	Nizam was forced to pay a large indemnity and cede territory of Daulatabad, Aurangabad, and Solapur.

Belligerents
Maratha Empire; Peshwa Fraction; Gwalior State; Nagpur Kingdom; Indore State; Baroda State	Nizam of Hyderabad

Commanders and leaders
Sawai Madhavrao; Daulat Rao Shinde; Jiva Dada Bakshi; Tukojirao Holkar; Raghoji II Bhonsle; Govind Rao Gaekwad	Asaf Jah II (surrendered); Arastu Jah; Monsieur Raymond; Lal Khan †

Strength
83,000 cavalry	100,000 infantry, 59 heavy guns

The Battle of Kharda also called the Battle of Khurla, took place in 1795 between the Nizam of Hyderabad and the Maratha Empire, in which the Nizam was defeated.

== During the Battle ==
The Battle of Kharda, fought on March 11, 1795, was a significant conflict between the Maratha Empire and the Nizam of Hyderabad. Despite being under British protection, the Nizam received no support from Governor General John Shore, who adhered to a policy of non-intervention.

This strained relations between the Nizam and the British. Notably, this battle marked the last instance of all Maratha chiefs uniting under the leadership of Parshuram Bhau Patwardhan. The Maratha army included a vast force of cavalry, gunners, bowmen, artillery, and infantry.

The Nizam’s forces, commanded by Assud Ally and supported by French commander Michel Raymond, faced the Maratha troops led by Parshuram Bhau, Scindia, and Holkar. The Nizam fielded 17,000 infantry and cavalry, while the Marathas deployed 83,000 cavalry, 38,000 infantry, and 192 cannons. Early in the battle, Lal Khan, a Pathan commander in the Nizam's army, injured Parshuram Bhau but was later killed by Hari Pant. The Nizam's infantry, under Raymond, launched an attack on the Marathas, but Jivabadada Kerkar, leading Scindia’s forces, countered effectively, forcing the Hyderabad troops to retreat to the fort of Kharda.

The Marathas laid siege to the fort, cutting off the Nizam's supply lines. The siege, lasting 17 to 22 days, caused extreme hardships for the Nizam’s troops and animals, with many resorting to eating tamarind leaves. Conditions in the Nizam’s camp were dire, with water reportedly selling for a rupee per cup.

Under immense pressure, the Nizam sought negotiations, which concluded in April 1795. As part of the terms, the Nizam agreed to dismiss his minister, Azeem-ul-Omrah, who had insulted the Peshwa. This decisive Maratha victory not only showcased their military strength but also strained the relationship between the Nizam and the British, ultimately altering the region’s political dynamics.

== Treaty of Kharda ==
The treaty of Kharda banned cow slaughter in the Deccan. Nizam of Hyderabad after the Nizam was defeated in battle and forced to pay a large indemnity and cede territory to the Maratha Empire, including Daulatabad, Aurangabad, and Solapur.
