= Madhogarh Fort, Haryana =

Madhogarh Fort
- माधोगढ़ का किला (Hindi)
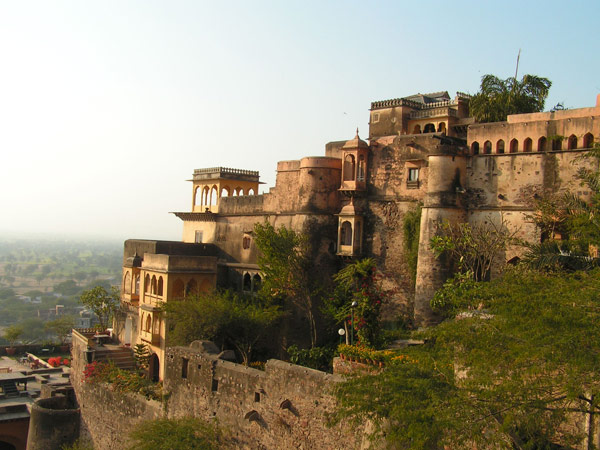

- Location within Haryana Location within India
- 28°17′52″N 76°1′59″E
- Location: Madhogarh, Haryana, Haryana, India

History
- Built: first half of 18th century
- Built for: Madho Singh I

Site notes
- Architectural style: Hindu
- Governing body: Archaeological Survey of India

Madhogarh Fort is a fort located on top of Madhogarh Hill in the Aravalli mountain range, near Madhogarh village, in the Mahendragarh district of Haryana state in India. It is located 12 kilometres (7.5 mi) from Mahendragarh's Satnali Chowk on SH27 Mahendragarh-Satnali-Loharu State Highway. In the Madhogarh village, there are several old havelis of interest to tourists, built in the vernacular Hindu architecture in the style of Shekhawati havelis.

== History ==
Madhogarh founded by Madho Singh I in the first half of the 18th century, when he placed the area under the control of Balwant Singh. The fort is named after Madho Singh I; "Madhogarh" literally means "the fort of Madho". Around 1755, this area passed from the Rajputs to the Maratha Empire under Maharaja Khande Rao Holkar of Indore when he attacked the independent Mughal chieftain Ismail Beg, Ismail Beg escaped to Madhogarh and established a post near Madhogarh fort. Khande Rao Holkar attacked Madhogargh fort and captured it on 16 February 1792. Ismail Beg escaped and attacked Kanud when the ruling wife of already deceased Nawab Najaf Quli Khan had died. Khande Rao Holkar then attacked Kanud and captured Ismail Beg, imprisoned him at Agra Fort and put him to death in 1794. Maratha Maharaj Mahadaji Shinde (Scindia) of Gwalior had conquered Rania, Fatehabad and Sirsa from governor of Hissar. Haryana came under Maratha Empire. Mahad Ji divided Haryana in four territories: Delhi (Mughal emperor Shah Alam II, his family and areas surrounding Delhi), Panipat (Karnal, Sonepat, Kurukshetra and Ambala), Hisar (Hisar, Sirsa, Fatehabad, parts of Rohtak), Ahirwal (Gurugram, Rewari, Narnaul, Mahendragarh) and Mewat. Daulat Rao Scindia ceded Haryana on 30 December 1803 under the Treaty of Surji-Anjangaon to British East India Company's Company rule in India. It is very important from the point of view of tourism, it would be better to go here during the time of rain and winter, it is also called "Mini Musuri" of local area during foggy session. According to the information received from the bujurg people, this fort was built in 16-17 AD and Swai Madho Singh built it for take rest between Jaipur and Delhi, and the village was named Madhogadh in his name. At that time, Madhogarh trade point between Delhi and Jaipur was strong. There are still many havelis of Baniyas (Business men) built below the hill. In which the film also shot titled "Jalpari".

== Attractions ==
Among the numerous forts spread across Haryana, only very few are hill forts. The Madogarh Fort is among those few hill forts of Haryana, hence special. Surrounded by the protective rampart, the fort has a palace, a garrison building and a step well. The Madhogarh Palace Car Park inside the fort, in fort of the palace, is reachable by a motorable black-topped road which is 2.6 km from Madhogarh village's bus stop.

The rampart is several meter high and it is built along the highest ridge line of the hill. It is made of stone masonry using the in-situ available stones. The rampart has a few feet high continuous parapet on top on the outward facing side of the rampart. There are several observation guard towers along the length of the rampart.

The Madhogarh Palace is a several story high building, with a 2-story high gateway as the main entrance.

The Madhogarh Garrison-cum-storage building is a large square-shaped ruined structure 50 m ariel distance northwest of the palace. It is accessible from the car park in front of the palace, via a 150 meter foot track running along the northern side of the palace.

The Madhogarh Step Well, built as the main water supply for the fort, is dependent on the rain water harvesting. The step well has a ghat, i.e. flight of stairs, leading down to the water. The rampart begins on the western corner of the stepwell. The step well is approximate 100 m ariel distance west of the palace, it is reachable by a 100 m foot track which begins 100 meter before the palace off the left or western side of the motorable road going to the palace.

The Madhogarh Ropeway and the Madhogarh Glass Bridge Skywalk are also planned. See also Ropeway s in India and Glass Bridge Skywalk in India.

== Architecture ==
The architecture is of Hindu Rajput origin.

From the perspective of defence, it is hard to access fort and stairs were formed by cutting the rocks in the hills. It has two portions: an upper section on top of the hill, with a ruined main structure, and a smaller section just below the top of the hill. The fort is surrounded by a high and thick wall around the hill with several bastions. Below the sections of the fort, there is a water tank that still stands. The upper complex has a few chambers that appear to be connected to the water tank.

== Conservation and further development ==
The Government of Haryana plans to develop an integrated tourist resort incorporating the Madhogarh fort. Both Mahendragarh fort and Madhogarh fort are being restored along the lines of Pinjore Gardens to develop them as the international tourist destination as part of Rewari-Narnaul-Mahendragarh-Madhogarh tourist circuit, and of the INR 100 crore an initial amount of INR 30 crore was already released for the Madhogarh fort in fy2018-19.

== In popular culture ==
Owing to its picturesque location, several movies including Kaun Kitne Paani Mein and Jalpari: The Desert Mermaid were shot here, as was Aditya Narayan's popular Haryanvi song "git pit git pit".

== See also ==
- Nangal Sirohi
