= Sahib Singh of Patiala =

Third ruler and the Raja-e-Rajgan of Patiala (r.1781–1813)

Sahib Singh
- Raja-e-Rajgan
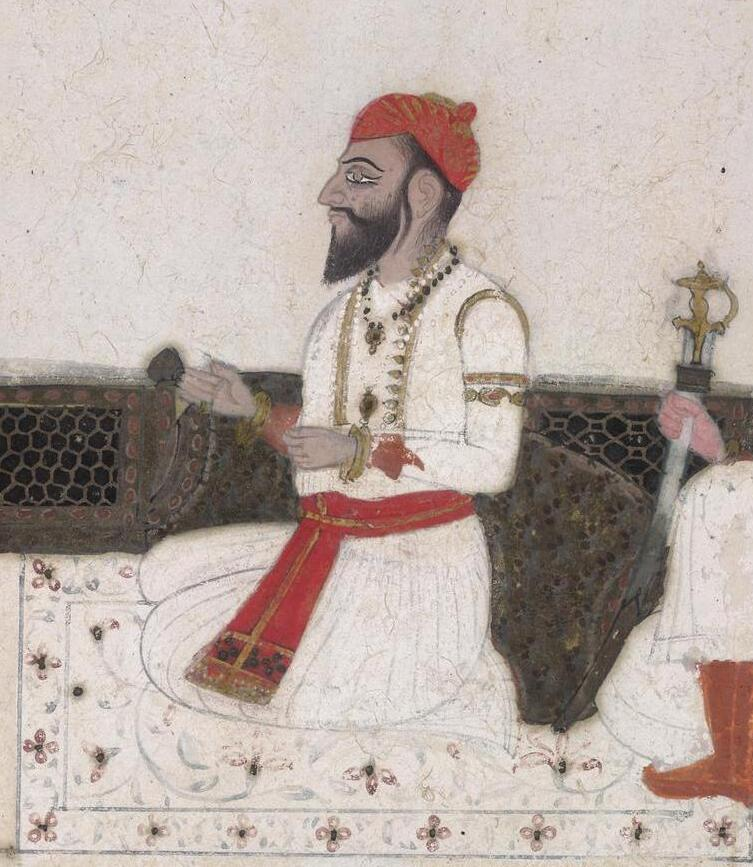
- Sahib Singh, detail from a painting, c. 1805

Maharaja of Patiala
- Reign: 1781–1813
- Predecessor: Amar Singh
- Successor: Karam Singh
- Regent: Dewan Nandu Mal (1781–1790)
- Born: 18 August 1773
- Died: 1813
- Spouse: Rattan Kaur
- Issue: Karam Singh
- Dynasty: Phulkian dynasty
- Father: Amar Singh
- Religion: Sikhism

Sahib Singh (1773–1813) was the third ruler and the Raja-e-Rajgan (King of Kings) of the Patiala. Singh's reign was noted for the power and influence wielded by his sister, Sahib Kaur, who served as his Prime Minister and the General of Patiala's army. He was also a member of the Phulkian dynasty. In 1809, Singh allied with and pledged loyalty to the British Empire. In historiography, Sahib Singh is regarded as an incompetent ruler that ruined the state's administration, with Lepel H. Griffin writing a disparaging account of Sahib Singh's reign, describing him as a puppet. However, the accuracy of the account is questioned on its veracity, as important events such as the Maratha clashes, Ranjit Singh's expeditions, and the 1809 treaty occurred during his reign.

== Early life ==
Sahib Singh was born on 18 August 1773 and succeeded his father, Amar Singh, as the Raja-e-Rajgan (King of Kings) of Patiala in 1781 at the age of 7.

== Reign ==
=== Regency ===
Singh acceded to the throne in 1781 when he was seven years old. From 1781 to 1790, the prime minister of Patiala, Dewan Nandu Mal, was the regent of Patiala and his grandmother, Rani Hukman also played a key role in the state's administration. During his regency, Singh faced rebellion from several family members, which Mal successfully suppressed. Rajindar Kaur, a relative of Singh's family and the granddaughter of Ala Singh, the first Raja of Patiala, also assisted him during the regency. From December 1785 to January 1786, Rajindar Kaur, with the help of the Maratha Empire, reconquered Patiala's lost territory.

In 1787, he married Rattan Kaur and in 1790, the regency in Patiala ended and Singh removed Mal as prime minister by exiling him from the state.

=== Rule and administration ===
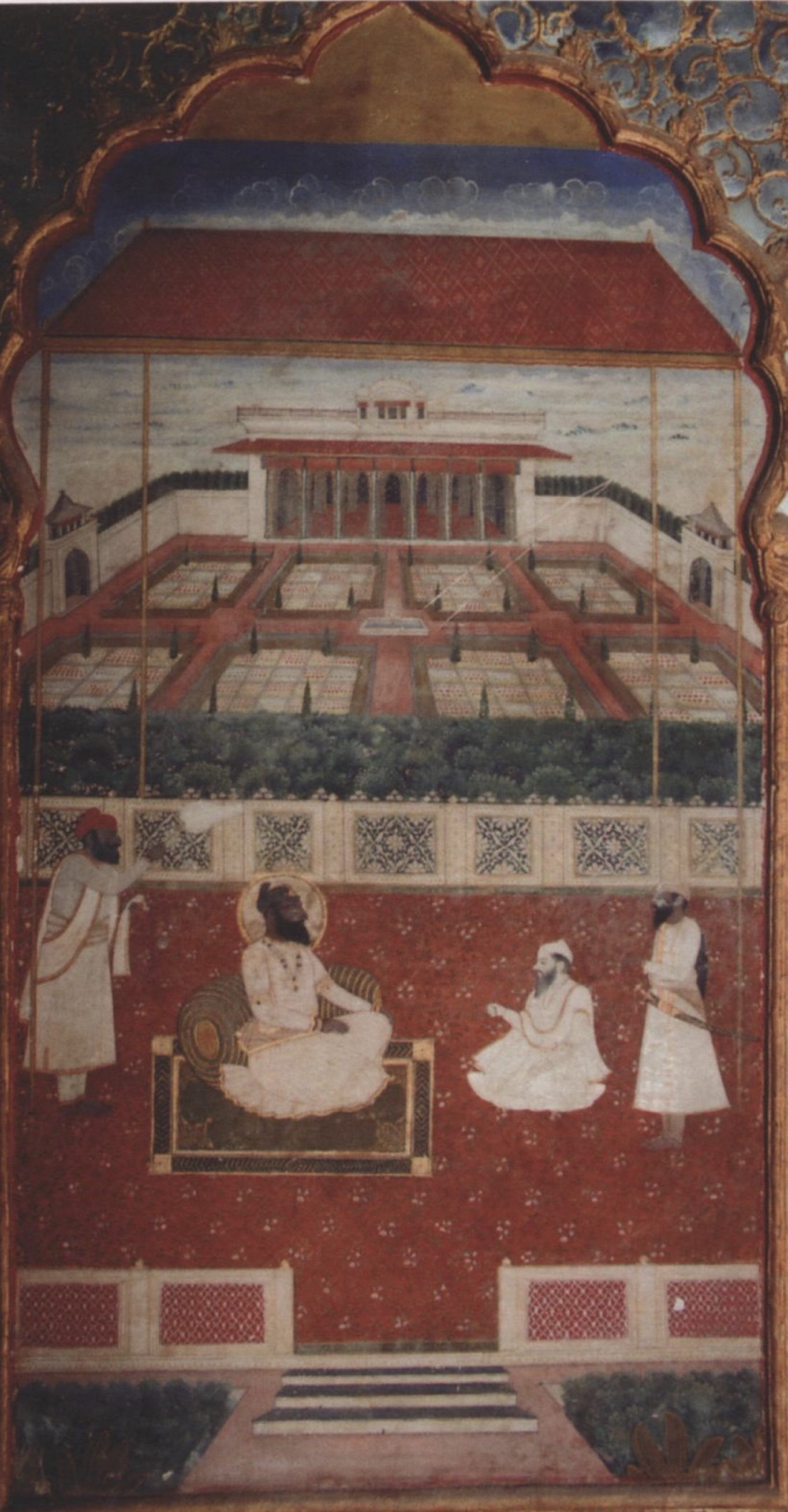
Mural of Sahib Singh holding durbar from the Sheesh Mahal of the Qila Mubarak, ca.1845–62

After Singh took full control of Patiala State in 1790, he appointed his sister Sahib Kaur, as his Prime Minister and the leader of his armies. In 1794, the Maratha Empire invaded Patiala; however, Kaur managed to successfully repel the Marathas. Kaur was later dismissed from her offices after a quarrel with Singh. In 1809, Singh and the rulers of the other the Cis-Sutlej states, pledged their loyalty to the British Empire, in return for protection from Maharaja Ranjit Singh of the Sikh Empire. In 1810, he was bestowed with the title of maharaja by the British for his loyalty.

== Death and succession ==
Singh died in 1813 and was succeeded by his son Karam Singh, who was a minor at the time.
