= Battle of Mardanpur =

1794 battle in the Maratha–Sikh wars

- Part of the Maratha–Sikh Clashes
Date	1794
Location	Mardanpur, Patiala
Result	Sikh victory

Belligerents
Patiala	Maratha Confederacy

Commanders and leaders
Bibi Sahib Kaur; Sardar Tara Singh Ghaiba; Raja Bhag Singh; Jodh Singh; Bhanga Singh; Mehtab Singh; Dip Singh; Bir Singh	Lakshmi Rao; Ghanta Rao; Anta Rao; Lachhman Rao; Ranjit Rao

Strength
7,000	12,000

Casualties and losses
Unknown	Unknown

The Battle of Mardanpur was fought between the Sikh forces of Patiala state led by Bibi Sahib Kaur and the Maratha forces led by Lakshmi Rao.

== Background ==
In 1794, a large force led by Lakshmi Rao, Anta Rao and Lachhman Rao crossed the Yamuna and marched towards Patiala. Raja Bhag Singh of Jhind, Jodh Singh of Kalsia, Bhanga Singh and Mehtab Singh of Thanesar and the Bhadaur sardars Dip Singh and Bir Singh agreed to join her while Sardar Tara Singh Ghaiba sent a detachment. These forces combined numbered around 7,000. They marched to meet the Marathas at Mardanpur.

== Battle ==
The Marathas had initially defeated the Sikh contingent, and the latter retreated to Rajpura. Sahib Kaur, following an impassioned speech, rallied the Sikhs to return to Patiala and once again fight the Marathas. The next day, the Sikhs attacked the advance guard of the Marathas, who were later reinforced by the remaining army. During the night, after both sides had retreated to their camps, the Sikhs made a surprise attack on Madho Rao who was busy performing the funerary rites of his dead soldiers, however, the Marathas successfully prevented the Sikhs from infiltrating their camp. Following another attack by the Sikhs before dawn, the Marathas retired to Karnal.

== Sources ==
- Gandhi, Surjit Singh (1999). Sikhs in the Eighteenth Century. Singh Bros. ISBN 9788172052171.
- Griffin, Lepel H. (1873). The Rajas Of The Punjab. ISBN 9788172052171.
- Singh, Harban (1992). The Encyclopedia Of Sikhism - Volume IV.
- Singh, Sawan (2005). Noble And Brave Sikh Women. ISBN 9788176017015.
