= Bibi Rajindar Kaur =

Sikh princess (1739–1791)

Rajindar Kaur
- Princess
- Born: 1739
- Died: 1791 (aged 51–52)
- Spouse: Tilok Chand
- Dynasty: Phulkian dynasty
- Father: Bhumia Singh
- Religion: Sikhism

Bibi Rajindar Kaur (1739–1791), also known as Rajindan or Rajindran, was a Sikh princess of Patiala. (Note: She is also known as 'Rani Rajinder Kaur'.) Kaur was the granddaughter of Ala Singh, the founder and first Raja of Patiala, and the first cousin of Amar Singh, the Raja-e-Rajgan and second ruler of Patiala. She is remembered for her leadership in protecting the Patiala kingdom from Marathas in the late-18th century, alongside Rani Sahib Kaur.

== Biography ==
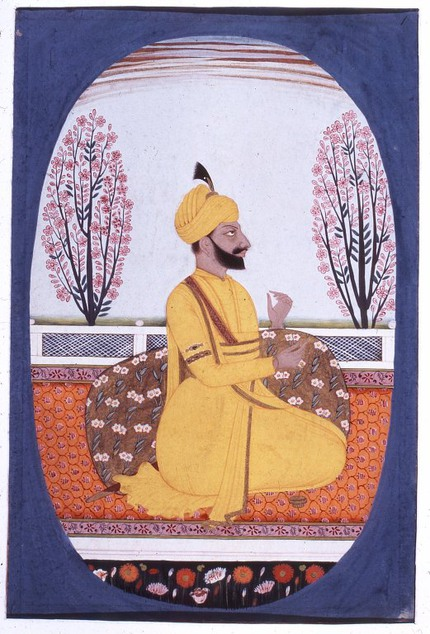
Portrait of Raja-e-Rajgan Amar Singh of Patiala, first cousin of Bibi Rajindar Kaur

Rajindar Kaur, the daughter of Bhumia Singh, was born in 1739. She was the granddaughter of Ala Singh, the founder and first Raja of Patiala. Kaur was raised by her grandfather, Ala Singh, after her father, Bhumia, died when she was 4 years old and in 1751, she was married to Chaudhari Tilok Chand of Phagwara. Her husband, Tilok Chand, soon died and she was left in charge of her husband's estates, which consisted of over 200 villages.

In 1765, Kaur offered to pay for the release of her grandfather, Ala Singh, after he was held captive by Ahmad Shah Durrani, the King of the Durrani Empire, for a tribute dispute; however, Durrani declined the offer, considering it improper to accept money from a daughter of Ala Singh's family. In 1778, her first cousin, Amar Singh, the Raja-e-Rajgan of Patiala and the second ruler of Patiala, was defeated by Hari Singh of Sialba, and Kaur led an army, to his rescue.

Kaur also held considerable influence during the regency of Sahib Singh, the son of Amar Singh. From December 1785 to January 1786, Kaur, with the help of the Maratha Empire, reconquered Patiala's lost territory during the regency of Sahib Singh.

In 1790, Kaur, at the head of a military guard, negotiated a settlement with Mahadji Shinde, the Maharaja of Gwalior and the Naib Vakil (Regent) of the Mughal Empire, to avoid war and for the Marathas to withdraw from Patiala territory. Kaur's settlement with Shinde also successfully thwarted the objectives of Rane Khan, another Maratha leader, who failed to reduce the power of Patiala and the other Sikh leaders, and failed to extract permanent tributes from them. The settlement also fulfilled Kaur's objectives, as she was opposed to the policy of appeasing the Marathas. In 1790, the Maratha general Ranee Khan assisted Patiala with repelling attacks from other Sikh chiefs in-return for a payment of six lakh rupees. Diwan Nanu Mal, who was the diwan of Patiala, agreed to the payment but later reneged. Thus, Ranee Khan's forces attacked Patiala but Rajindran assured the Maratha general that she would make sure that the diwan fulfill on what he had promised. However, Rajindran failed to convince Nanu Mal to pay-up, thus Ranee Khan arrested Nanu Mal, Rajindran, Devi Ditta (son of Nanu Mal), and Rai Ahmad of Jagraon, and forced them to march to Panipat. However, Rai Ahmad managed to escape via scheming at Panipat and Nanu Mal was released in-order to get money. However, Rajindran and Devi Ditta were kept imprisoned in Mathura as ransom but were eventually released when Nanu Mal finally made the promised payment.

Gopal Rao Maratha occupied Panipat in 1791 and needing funds, decided to extort Patiala for money. Rani Rajindar Kaur and Nanu Mal agreed to pay eight lakh rupees to the Maratha. However, when Nanu Mal attempted to leave for Patiala to get the necessary funds, it was decided he was too untrustworthy and therefore he was jailed alongside Rajindar Kaur. Gopal Rao ended-up dispatching an army of 10,000 soldier under Ravloji Sindhia and Jiva Dada to attack the Sikhs, with troops also being sent by the Nawab of Oudh to assist the Marathas. However, Rajindar Kaur was able to negotiate a deal for her and Nanu Mal's release via the English. Later, General Pierre Cuillier-Perron tried to attack Patiala. After the general reached Karnal, he demanded that Raja Sahib Singh of Patiala, Raja Bhag Singh of Jind, Bhanga Singh of Thanesar, and Lal Singh of Kaithal to bring him tribute, however they all rebuffed him so he prepared for war against the Sikh chiefs. As part of his readying for war, Perron had 10,000 Muslim horsemen provided by Gulsher Khan of Kunj to attack the Sikh state of Thanesar. Bhanga Singh of Thanesar managed to escape and sought shelter at Patiala. The tensions between Perron and the cis-Sutlej Sikhs was defused by the diplomatic efforts of Rani Rajindar Kaur.

Sahib Singh of Patiala did not like how Rajindar Kaur had defused the situation with Perron and refused to meet her. This saddened Rani Rajindar Kaur and she died in 1791.

== See also ==
- Sada Kaur
