= Amar Singh of Patiala =

Maharaja of Patiala from 1765 to 1781

Amar Singh
- Raja-e-Rajgan of Patiala
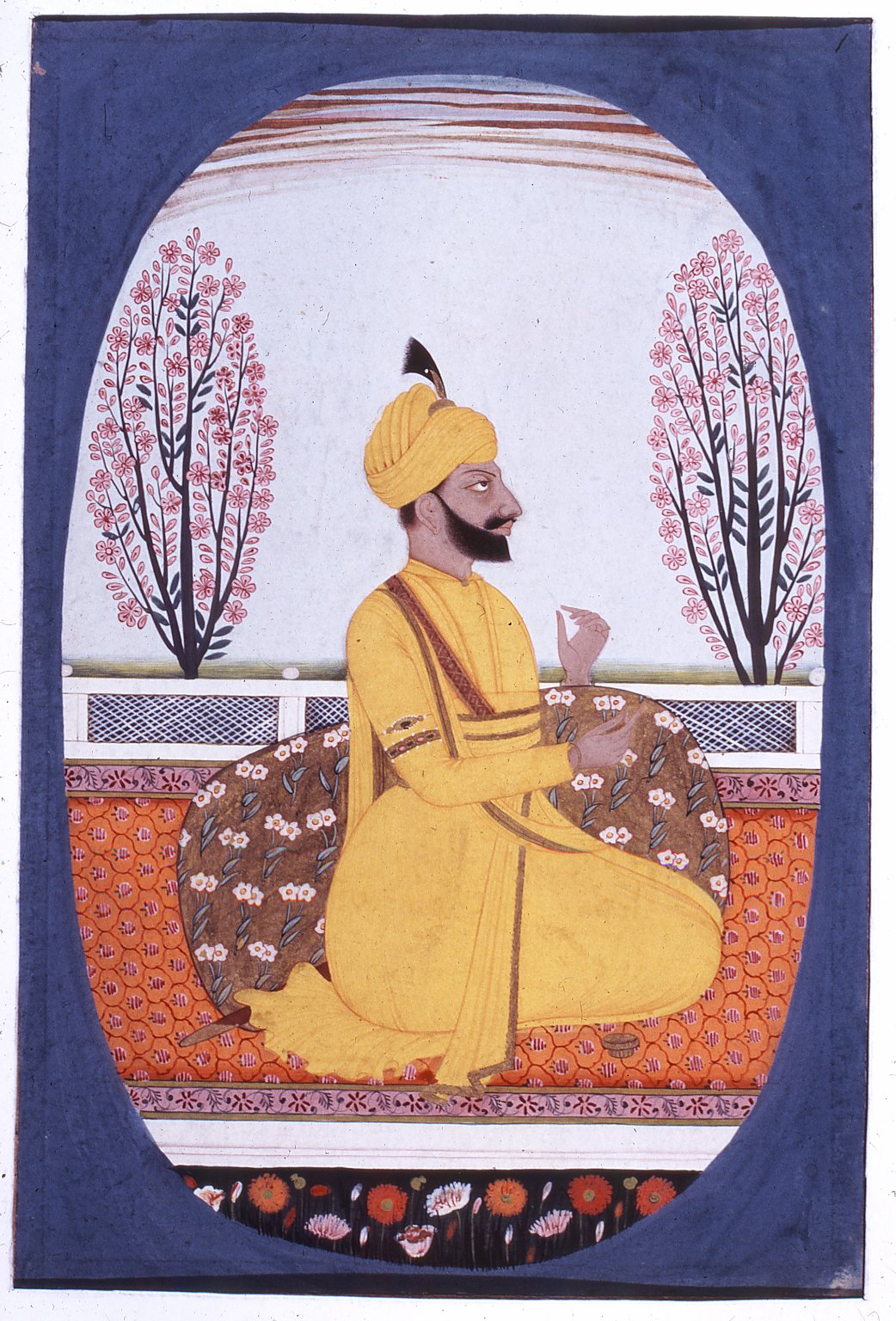
- Miniature painting of Amar Singh, c. 1830

Maharaja of Patiala
- Reign: 1765–1781
- Enthronement: 1765
- Predecessor: Ala Singh
- Successor: Sahib Singh
- Born: 7 June 1748
- Died: February 1781 (aged 32)
- Issue: Sahib Kaur and Sahib Singh
- Dynasty: Phulkian dynasty
- Father: Sardul Singh
- Religion: Sikhism

Amar Singh (7 June 1748 – February 1781) was the second ruler and the Raja-e-Rajgan (King of Kings) of Patiala. Singh succeeded his grandfather, Ala Singh, as the Raja of Patiala in 1765. In 1767, Ahmed Shah Abdali, the founder and king of the Afghan Durrani Empire, bestowed upon Singh the title of Raja-e-Rajgan, a superior royal title compared to the titles of other Sikh rulers and leaders. He reign is characterized by the expansion of the kingdom's territory to its greatest extent.

During his reign, Singh through many battles and conflicts, made Patiala the most powerful state between the Yamuna and the Sutlej rivers of North India. Singh also successfully continued the pragmatic foreign policy of his grandfather, Ala Singh, by maintaining good relations with both the Dal Khalsa and the Durrani Empire. The rival misls kept the aspiring Patiala ruler in-check.

His death in 1781, at the age of 34, is seen by historians as a tragedy for Patiala and Punjabi history. Historians have speculated that had Singh lived longer, he would have managed to grow Patiala to rival Maharaja Ranjit Singh's Sikh Empire and would have kept the British Empire from expanding into Punjab, as Ranjit Singh would not have been seen as a threat in the face of a larger and more powerful Patiala State. His was succeeded by his six-year-old son, Sahib Singh.

== Early life and background ==
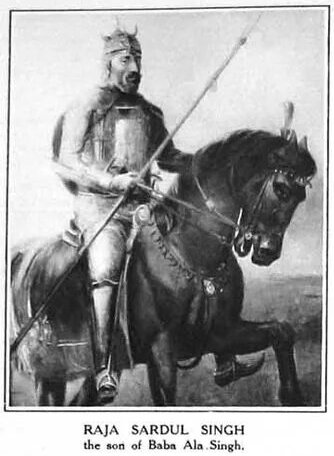
Raja Sardul Singh of Patiala, by Philip Tennyson Cole, published in 'The Graphic' (15 August 1925 issue). Sardul Singh was the son of Ala Singh and father of Amar Singh.

Amar Singh was born on 7 June 1748. He was the son of Sardul Singh and the grandson of Raja Ala Singh, the founder and first ruler of Patiala. Singh was a member of the Phulkian dynasty of Sikh rulers. Through his grandfather Ala Singh, Singh was also a direct descendant of Rawal Jaisal Singh, the founder and first ruler of the Kingdom of Jaisalmer in the 12th century. Early in his life, Jassa Singh Ahluwalia administered the Sikhism Amrit Sanskar initiation rite to Singh.

== Ascension ==
Ala Singh had three sons, all of whom predeceased him. After the death of his grandfather in 1765, Amar Singh, who was 18 years old at the time, was installed on the throne of Patiala by Fateh Kaur, his paternal grandmother and Ala Singh's widow.

However, Singh's ascension was contested by other members of his family, including his older half-brother Himat Singh, who revolted against him and captured Singh's Bhawanigarh Fort. Fateh Kaur later persuaded both brothers to compromise, with Singh's ascension recognized and Himmat being allowed to retain his possessions.

== Reign ==
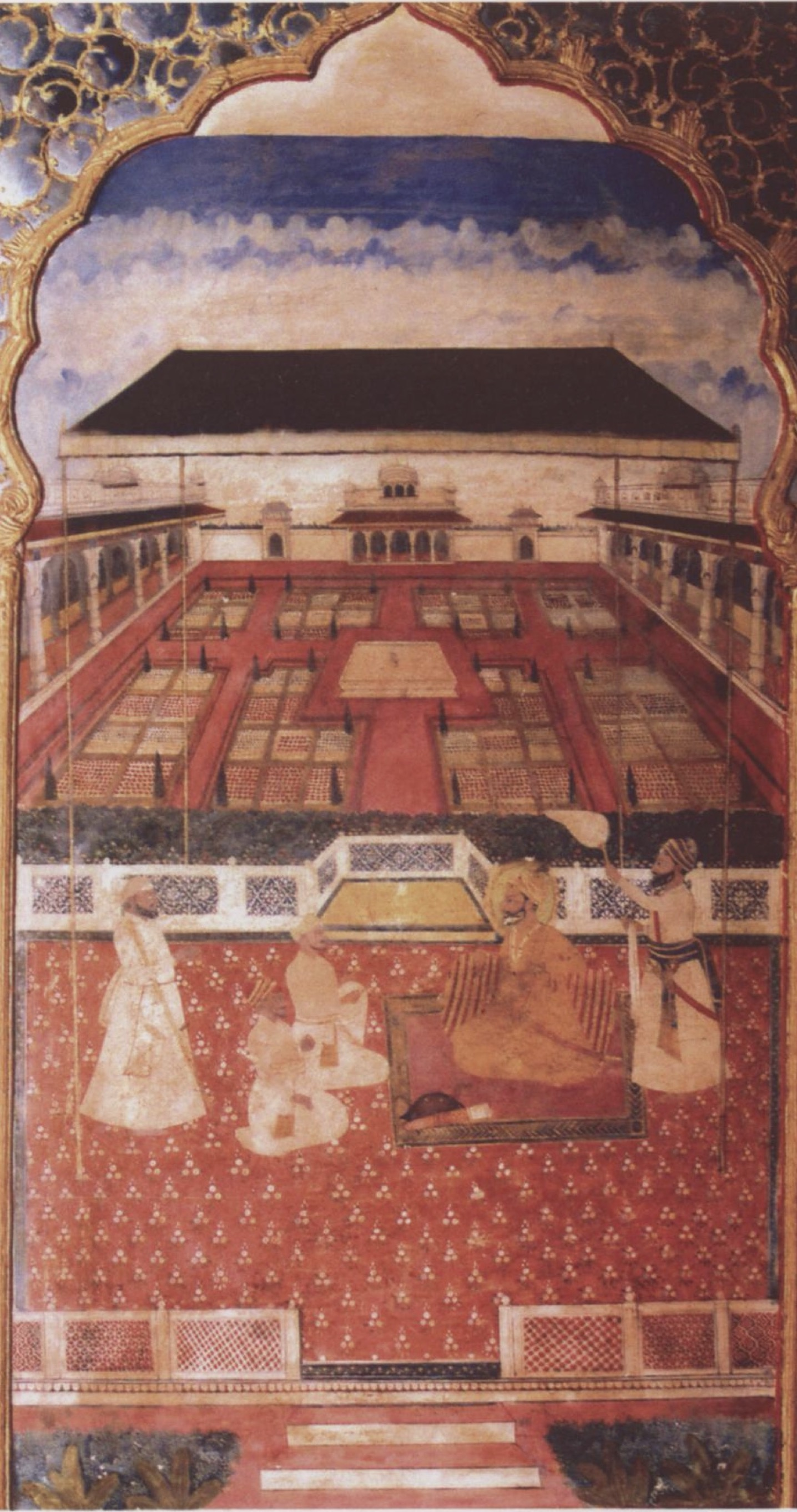
Mural of Amar Singh holding durbar from the Sheesh Mahal of the Qila Mubarak, ca.1845–62

Singh's reign as the Raja of Patiala began in 1765, and with the help of his grandmother Fateh Kaur, he secured his succession against revolts from some of his family members.

=== Raja-e-Rajgan and Bandi Chhor ===
In 1767, Ahmed Shah Abdali, the founder and king of the Afghan Durrani Empire, launched his last invasion campaign into Punjab. During this expedition, Singh met Abdali in person received the title Raja-e-Rajgan Bahadur (Brave King of Kings). Singh also paid the ransom of the captives taken by Abdali from Punjab, which earned Singh the title of Bandi Chhor (Releaser of Captives).

=== Battles and conflicts ===
In his reign, Singh engaged in numerous battles and conflicts. In 1766, Singh, along with Ahluwalia, captured the villages of Kotla and Issru. In 1767, he took the village Tibba from Ataullah Khan, the Nawab of Malerkotla. In 1768, Singh aided the Raja of Nahan in capturing Pinjore from Garib Das; in 1771, he overpowered Sukhchain Singh, annexing most of the territory around Bathinda; in 1774, Singh fought the Bhattis in Hisar, suffering heavy losses and the death of his son, Himmat Singh; in 1778, Singh subdued several other Bhatti regions. Also in 1778, after being defeated in battle by Hari Singh of Sialba, Singh was rescued by an army led by his cousin, Rajindar Kaur. In 1779, Singh and other Sikh rulers united to oppose the Mughal Empire's forces marching into Punjab, and their combined strength forced the Mughals to retreat.

=== Policies and administration ===
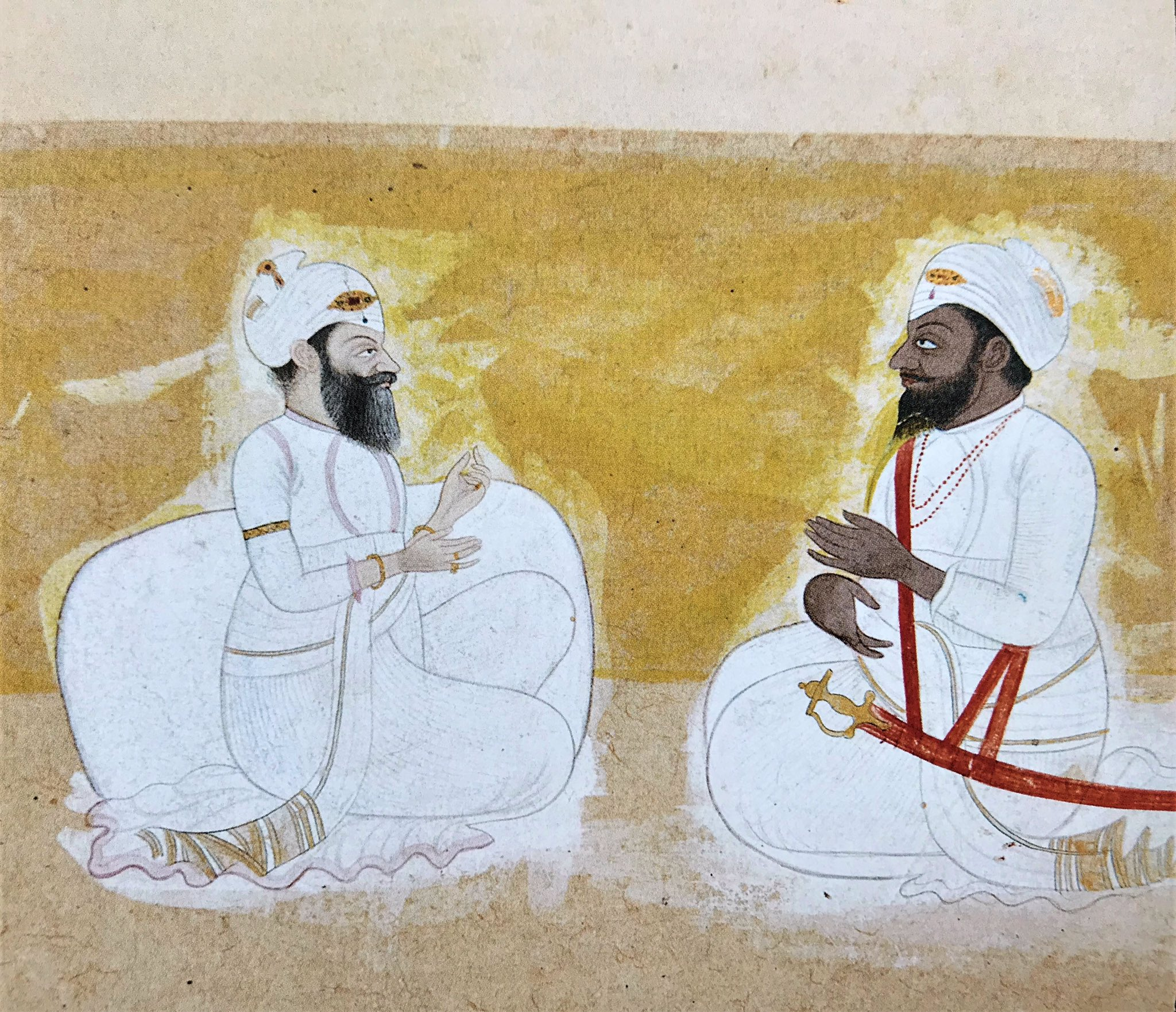
Sardar Jassa Singh Ramgarhia on left and Amar Singh of Patiala on right. Pahari late 18th century. Lahore Museum.

Singh successfully continued the same foreign policies as his grandfather Ala Singh, most notably maintaining good relations between the Dal Khalsa and the Durrani Empire. However, unlike Ala Singh, Singh was not criticised by other Sikh leaders, as their political policies had become flexible to the autonomy being exercised by various Sikh leaders. Singh was even accepted as a member of the Dal Khalsa. In 1767, Singh's relationship with Durrani prompted other Sikh leaders to argue for the invasion of Patiala; however, Ahluwalia forbade them from doing so. In 1781, Singh again supported Durrani Empire against the Dal Khalsa; however this time, Ahluwalia in retaliation invaded Singh's territory, forcing Singh to suspend his support to the Durrani Empire and make peace with Ahluwalia at the city of Khanna.

== Death and succession ==
Singh died in 1781, at the age of 34. According to historians, he died due to health complications from alcoholism. He was succeeded by his son Sahib Singh, who was six years old the time. His daughter, Sahib Kaur, served at times as the Prime Minister of Patiala and also as a general in the Patiala army.

== Legacy ==
Singh significantly strengthened Patiala State during his rule, making it the most powerful state between the Yamuna and the Sutlej rivers. Historians have speculated that, had he lived another twenty years, two powerful Sikh polities might have emerged: the Sikh Empire extending up to the Sutlej and the Patiala State spanning from the Yamuna to the Sutlej and from the Shivalik hills to the Thar Desert area near Bikaner. A powerful and larger Patiala State could have caused the British Empire to halt its expansion at Delhi and remain satisfied with the Patiala polity as the buffer state between the Sikh Empire and Delhi. This, along with the historical consensus that Singh's successors who ruled Patiala were considered primarily frivolous or hedonistic, has led historians to consider Singh's early death a tragedy for the history of both Patiala and Punjab.

== Gallery ==
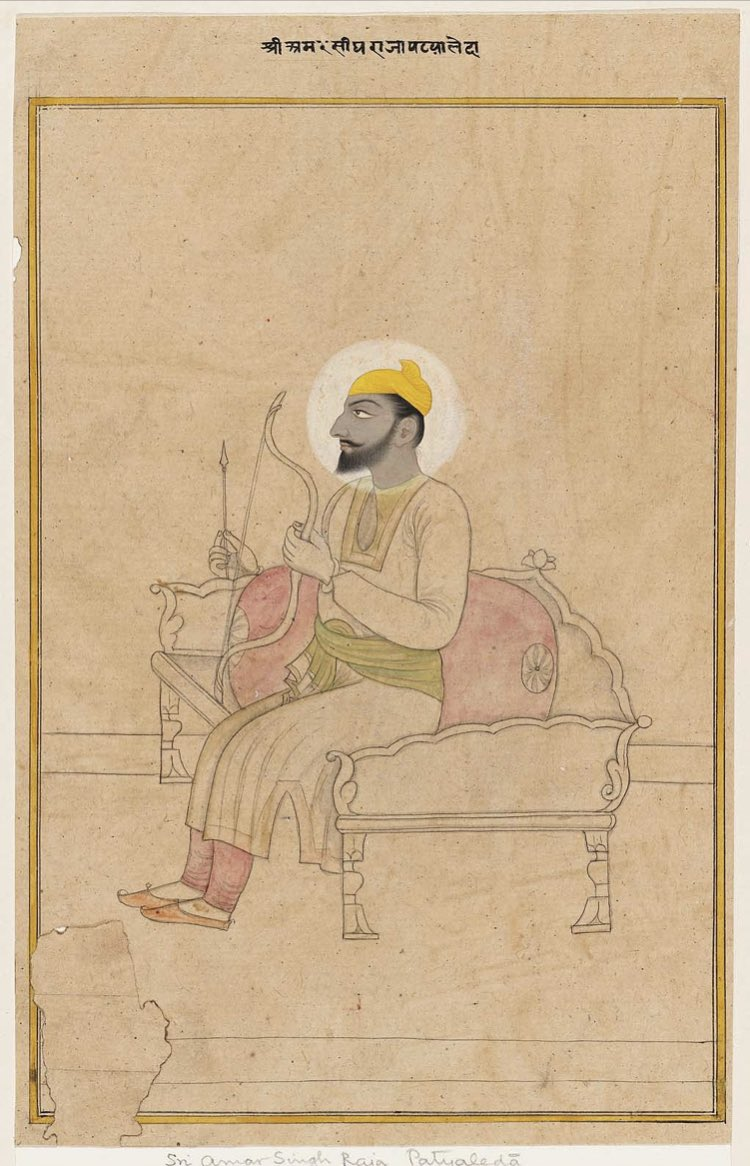
Painting of Amar Singh. Work attributed to school of Purkhu, circa 1850–1860.

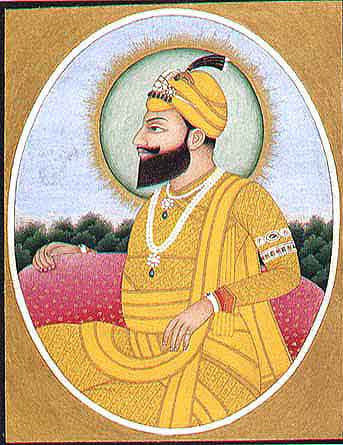
Painting of Amar Singh, ca. 1880
