= Capture of Delhi (1788) =

Maratha victory in India

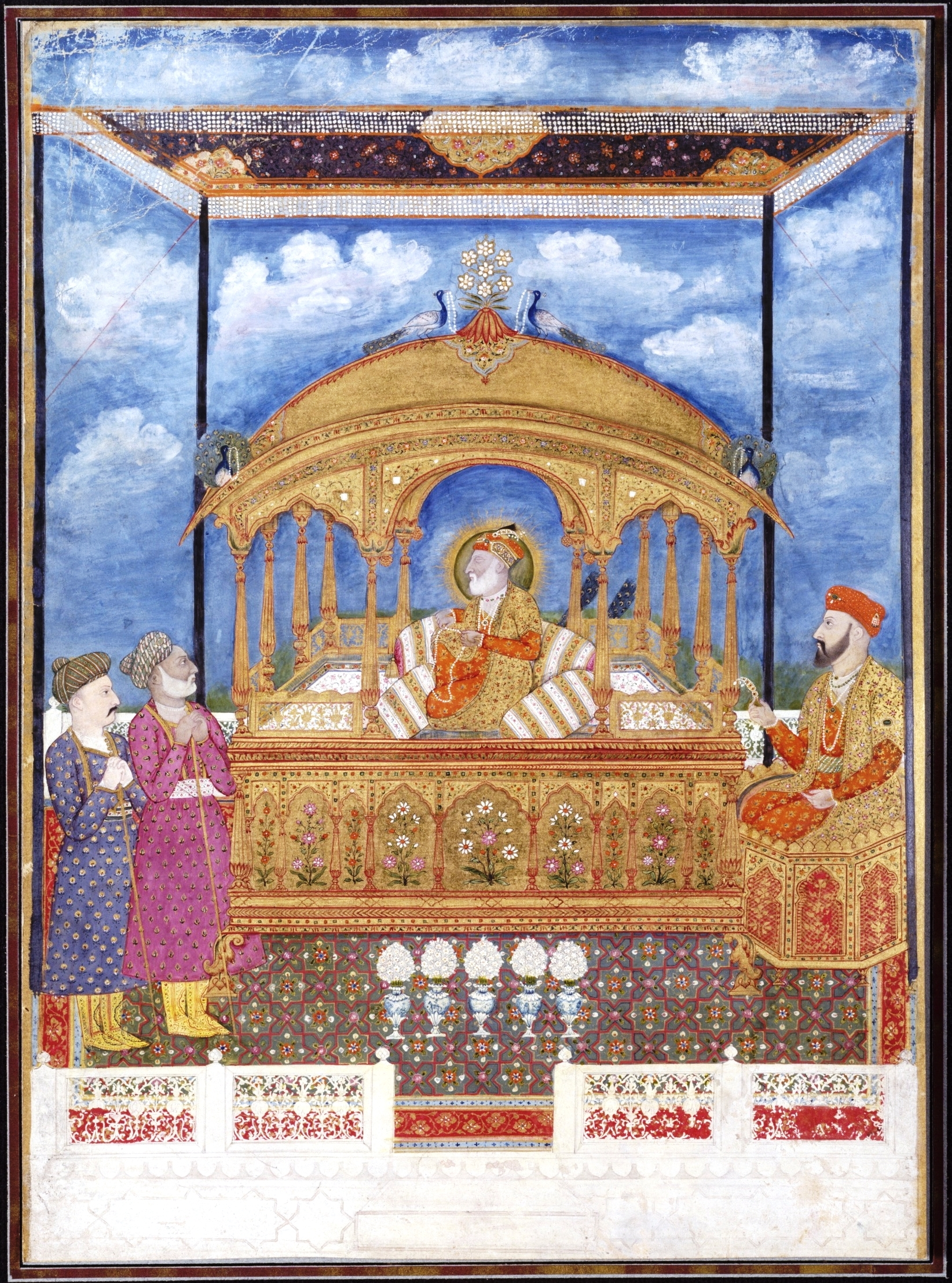
Date	October 2, 1788
Location	Shahjahanabad, Delhi Subah, Mughal Empire
Result	Maratha victory
Territorial changes	Delhi captured by Marathas

Belligerents
Rohilkhand Kingdom; Mughals under Ismail	Maratha Empire; Mughals under Shah Alam II

Commanders and leaders
Ghulam Qadir (executed); Mirza Ismail Beg (surrendered)	Mahadji Scindia; Ali Bahadur; Rane Khan; Jiva Dada Bakshi; Shah Alam II; Baghirathrao Shinde; Raji Patil; Devji Gawli

Strength
1,500+	Much larger than rohillas

The Capture of Delhi took place in 1788 between the forces of Ghulam Qadir Rohilla supported by Mirza Ismail Beg, and the Marathas under Mahadji Shinde on behalf of Shah Alam II who desired the execution of Ghulam Kadir. Mahadji Shinde became successful and executed Kadir after the battle.

== Background ==
In 1788, Ghulam Kadir, along with Mirza Is'mail Beg, initiated a campaign to capture Delhi, the capital of the Mughal Empire. Their objective was to seize control and establish their dominance in the region. However, internal disputes within the Mughal Empire hindered Mahadji's ability to send troops to defend Delhi.

Despite Mahadji's awareness of the impending threat, he was unable to mobilize his forces effectively due to ongoing internal conflicts. As a result, on July 18, 1788, Ghulam Kadir and his forces successfully captured Delhi. Upon seizing control of the city, Ghulam Kadir took drastic measures to solidify his power. He forcefully removed Shah Alam, the Mughal emperor, from his throne and subjected him to the cruel act of blinding. The atrocities committed by Ghulam Kadir extended beyond the ruling elite; innocent civilians, including infants and helpless women, were subjected to starvation and deprivation. Tragically, the violence escalated as Ghulam Kadir's forces unleashed terror upon the city. Numerous men fell victim to indiscriminate killings, while princesses were subjected to heinous acts of rape. The capture of Delhi in 1788 marked a dark chapter in the history of the Mughal Empire, characterized by widespread suffering and barbarity inflicted upon its inhabitants.

A letter was sent by Sadashiv Dinkar to Nana mentioning this events who immediately reported this to Mahadji ( on September 1788). He became furious when learnt about the deeds of Ghulam, he immediately marched towards Delhi in order to teach Ghulam a lesson, and to assist the Imperial and Maratha garrisons already fighting Kadir.

== Capture of Delhi ==
In October, Mahadji, accompanied by Rane Khan Bhai and Jiwabadada Baxi, arrived in Delhi. On October 2nd, the combined forces of Rana Khan and Jiwabadada defeated Ghulam and Ismail Beg, leading to the capture of Delhi. They proceeded to lay siege to the Agra fort, which they also captured, and reinstated a blinded Shah Alam to his throne. While Ismail Beg surrendered, Ghulam Kadir fled the area. Rana Khan, Raji Patil, Devji Gawli, and Baghirathrao Shinde were then sent to persuade Ghulam Kadir, eventually capturing the Aligarh fort. Ghulam Kadir subsequently fled.

== Battle of Meerut ==
Battle of Meerut (1788)
Date	2 October–18 December 1788
Location	Meerut, India
Result	Maratha victory.
Territorial changes	None

Belligerents
Kingdom of Rohilkhand	Maratha Empire

Commanders and leaders
Ghulam Kadir (executed)	Ali Bahadur; Mahadji Shinde

Strength
1,000–1,500	Much larger than the Rohillas
- In some sources, this battle is also called as Battle of Mathura instead of Meerut.

After the Marathas had liberated Delhi, a hunt for Ghulam Kadir was mounted by the Marathas. Ghulam Kadir fled to Meerut, which in turn was encircled by the Marathas. After the conditions there had become intolerable, he managed to break the encirclement during the night with 500 horsemen and tried to escape to Ghausgarh. But during the engagement of his horsemen by a Maratha patrol, he lost sight of his entourage. Then his horse stumbled and broke its leg and he had to continue his escape alone and on foot. He reached Bamnauli (Uttar Pradesh), where he sought refuge in a house of a Brahmin and offered him a reward for a horse and a guide, who could lead him to Ghausgarh. But the Brahmin recognized him and alerted a party of Marathas, who captured him on 18 December or 19 December 1788.

== Execution of Ghulam Kadir ==
Ghulam Kadir remained in Maratha custody for some time but was initially unharmed. On 28 February 1789, Shinde received a letter from Shah Alam II demanding the eyes of Ghulam Kadir as the Shah would otherwise retire to Mecca and live as a beggar. Mahadji then ordered the removal of his eyes, nose, tongue, lips, and upper limbs, which were sent to Shah Alam in a casket. After this was done, his hands, feet, and genitals were cut off, and on 3 March 1789, he was hanged from a tree and beheaded at Mathura.

== Aftermath ==
Following Ghulam Kadir's execution in 1789 at Mahadji Shinde's camp, Shah Alam thanked Mahadji for administering what he deemed as appropriate punishment. This acknowledgment led to significant rewards for Mahadji, including the administration of Hindu pilgrimage sites like Vrindavan and Mathura. Shah Alam also issued a royal decree banning cow slaughter, reflecting his efforts to respect Hindu sentiments. Additionally, due to the Emperor's blindness, Mahadji was effectively made the de facto ruler of Delhi, solidifying his political authority. These events illustrate the complex interplay of politics and religion during late 18th-century India, further consolidating Maratha Influence, which would last until 1803.

== Sources ==
- Garg, Sanjay (1996). "A Seal of Ghulam Qadir Rohilla". Numismatic Studies. 4: 91–94.
- Malik, Zahiruddin (1982). "Persian Documents pertaining to the tragic End of Ghulam Qadir Rohilla, 1780–1789". Proceedings of the Indian History Congress. 43: 565–571. ISSN 2249-1937. JSTOR 44141288.
- Sarkar, Jadunath (1952). Fall of the Mughal Empire. Vol. III (2 ed.). Calcutta: M. C. Sarkar & Sons.
