= Ala Singh =

Maharaja of Patiala from 1763 to 1765

- Raja of Patiala
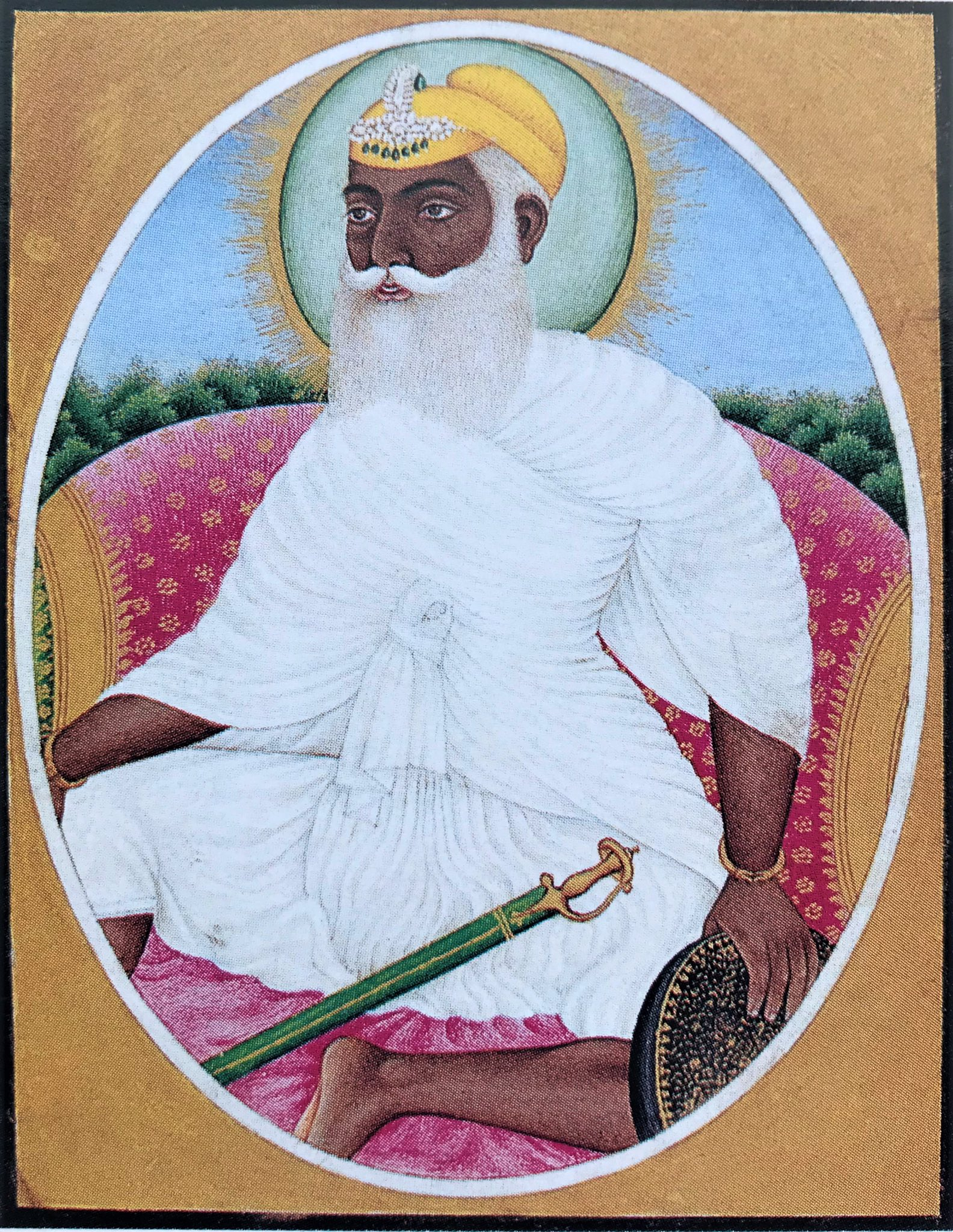
- Portrait of Ala Singh c. 1880

Maharaja of Patiala
- Reign: 1763 – 7 August 1765
- Investiture: 1763
- Successor: Amar Singh
- Born: 1691; Phul, Punjab, India
- Died: 7 August 1765 (aged 73–74)
- Spouse: Mai Fatto (Fateh Kaur)
- Issue: Sardaul Singh; Bumian Singh; Lal Singh; Pardhan Kaur
- Dynasty: Phulkian
- Father: Chowdari Ram Singh
- Mother: Sabi Kaur
- Religion: Sikhism

Ala Singh (1691 – 7 August 1765) was the founder and first ruler of Patiala from 1763 until his death in 1765. Born into the Sikh Phulkian dynasty, Singh rose to power through key battles in his early life and expanded his territory in Punjab. As an adult, Singh was constantly engaged in battles and war. Through warfare and diplomacy, Singh began to acquire territory that would form the foundations of Patiala State. In 1763, he established the city of Patiala and founded Patiala State. Singh, at various times, had both adversarial and allied relations with the Afghan Durrani Empire. Ahmed Shah Durrani, the King of the Durrani Empire, granted Singh the title of Raja and other royal powers. After being granted the title of Raja, Singh became the first Sikh monarch in history. Much of his personal success has been attributed to the influence and connections of his wife, Mai Fatto.

Singh was praised and criticised, both by his contemporaries and historians, for his shrewd and cunning policies and strategies. Many in the Dal Khalsa recognized his strength and pragmatism; however, they found him to be an unworthy Sikh, and clashes with the Dal Khalsa persisted throughout Singh's adult life. Singh's reign ended with his death in 1765, and he was succeeded by his grandson, Amar Singh.

== Lineage ==
Ala Singh was born into the Phulkian dynasty, named after Chaudhary Phul Sidhu-Brar, Singh's paternal grandfather, who was also the common ancestor of the rulers of Nabha, Jind and Faridkot. Singh is claimed to be a direct descendant of Rawal Jaisal Singh, the founder and first ruler of the Kingdom of Jaisalmer from 1156 to 1168, Jaisal Singh, is further said to be a descendant of Rao Bhatti, a 3rd-century Hindu king.

=== Mythological ancestry ===
Descendants of Rao Bhatti, including the former and historical Patiala royal family, also claim to be direct descendants of Yadu, a mythological Hindu monarch from whom Bhatti claimed descent. According to Hindu mythology, Yadu was the founder of the mythological Yadu dynasty, a branch of the legendary Lunar dynasty (IAST: Candravaṃśa). Singh and his family also claimed direct descent from Krishna, who was himself a direct descendant of Yadu according to Hindu tradition.

== Early life ==
Ala Singh was born in 1691 in Phul, in the present-day Bathinda district of Punjab. He was born into the Jat Sikh Phulkian dynasty to Chaudhary Ram Singh of the Phulkian Misl. Singh's mother was Sabi Kaur. His father had six children, from eldest to youngest: Dunna, Sabha, Ala, Bakhta, Buddha, Laddha.

At the age of 16, Singh married Fateh Kaur, also known as Mai Fatto. Kaur's cousin, Gurbaksh Singh Kaleke, later helped Singh found Patiala State. Singh's father Ram, was killed by the sons of Chain Singh. He and his brother Subha later avenged their father by killing two of Chain Singh's sons.

== Battles, conflicts and conquests ==
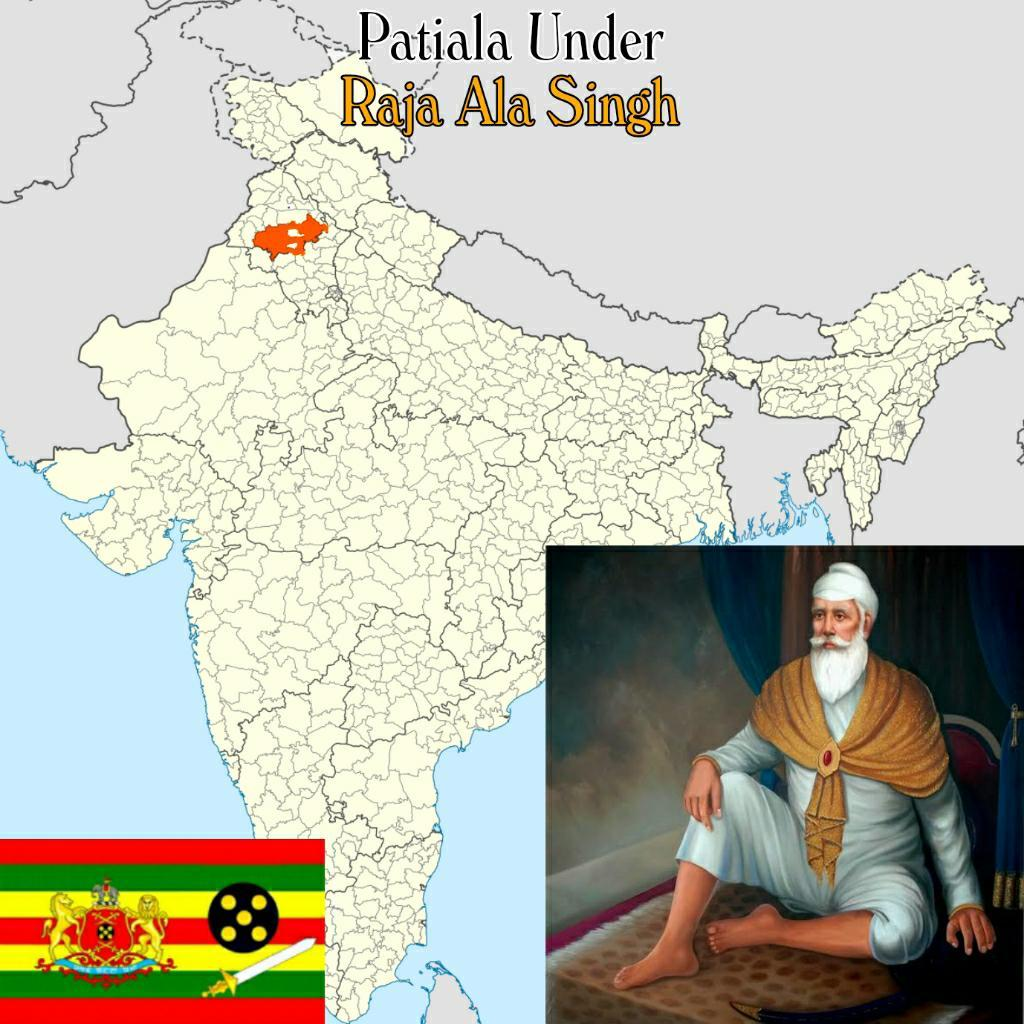
Kingdom of Raja Ala Singh

During his life, Singh engaged in many battles and conflicts in the Punjab region. As per Satnam Singh, Ala Singh, establisher of Patiala, had been conquering territory since around 1730. The Battle of Barnala in 1731 was a significant turning point in Singh's life. In the battle, Singh, along with the Majha Sikhs led by Kapur Singh, faced off against a confederacy of neighboring Muslim chiefs. His victory in this conflict established him as one of the prominent chiefs in the Cis-Sutlej region. Between the last 1730s and the early 1740s, Singh was in conflict with the Muslim Bhattis. In 1749, he built a fortress in Bhawanigarh and led an expedition to Bhatinda where he conquered territory for himself and his then expanding domain. In 1759, Singh, along with his son Lal Singh, managed to break the stalemate with the Muslim Bhattis and defeated them in a battle at Dharsul.

=== Conflicts with the Durrani Empire ===
Singh had numerous conflicts with the Afghan Durrani Empire. In 1748, Singh plundered Ahmed Shah Durrani, the King of the Durrani Empire, and in 1757, he plundered Ahmed Shah Durrani's son, Taimur Shah Durrani. In 1760, he supplied grain to the Maratha Confederacy during their conflicts against the Durrani Empire.

During the Vadda Ghalughara in April 1762, Singh did not assist other Sikhs during the massacre by the Durrani Empire. He stayed neutral during the events and did not initiate hostilities against the Durrani Empire. However, Singh's neutrality did not benefit him as Ahmed Shah Durrani, who was told that Singh was secretly an ally of the Majha Sikhs by Zain Khan and Bikhan Khan, would later burn the city of Barnala and advances upon Bhawanigarh, where Singh had fortified himself. Singh sought the help of Najib-ud-Daula, the Mughal Empire's Administrator of Delhi, and was forced to pay a humiliating fee of five lakh rupees as a tribute and an additional twenty-five thousand rupees for permission to appear before Ahmed Shah Durrani with his long hair intact. Singh was later detained for a short period of time but was released on the promise that his territory would pay an annual tribute to the Durrani Empire.

== Ruler of Patiala ==
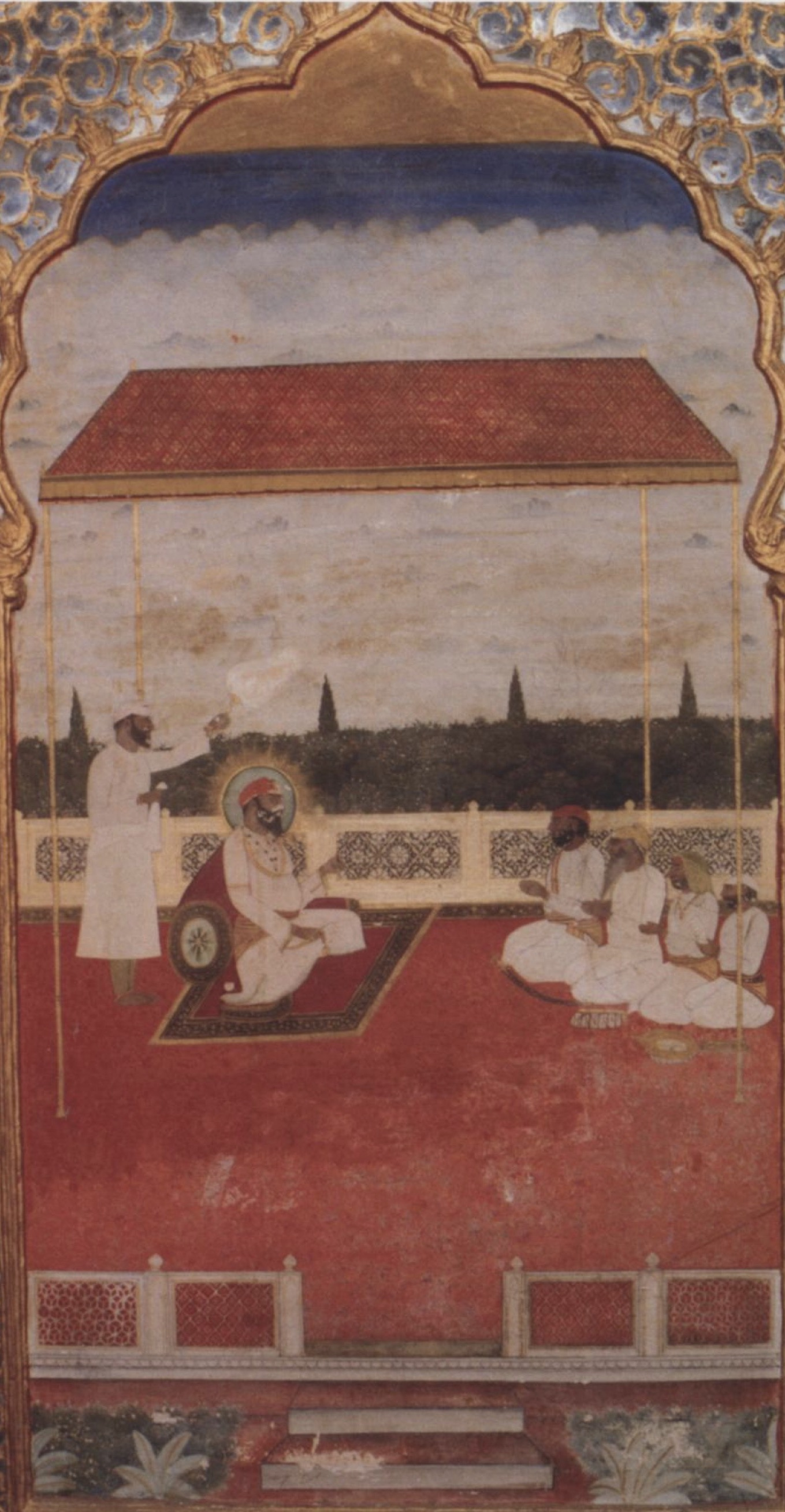
Mural of Ala Singh (seated left) holding durbar (court) from the Sheesh Mahal of the Qila Mubarak

=== Raja of Patiala ===
By 1758, Singh's successful conquests of cities and villages had established him as a dominant figure in the Malwa region. According to historian Karam Singh, this period marked his transition from a Sardar chief to de facto kingship. By the beginning of the 1760s, Singh had conquered a considerable amount of territory in Punjab, including Sunam, Samana, Banur, Ghuram, and Sanaur, and his capital was located in Barnala. In 1763, Ala Singh at the age of 57, founded of the city of Patiala and laid the foundations of Patiala State. In Patiala, he also built Qila Mubarak in 1763, which was initially constructed as a mud fortress and later reconstructed with bricks.

In 1764, while leading the Sikh Confederacy against the Durrani Empire, he conquered Sirhind and the surrounding territories along with his close friend Nanu Singh Saini. Singh later purchased part of the Sirhind for 25,000 rupees from the Sikh Confederacy, which enlarged his territory and formed the early territories of Patiala State. He also shifted his capital from Barnala to the city of Patiala in 1764. In 1765, Singh's granddaughter, Rajindar Kaur, offered to pay for his release after he was held captive by Durrani for not paying tribute; however, Durrani declined the offer, considering it improper to accept money from a daughter of Singh's family.

In 1765, Durrani granted Ala Singh the title of Raja, robe of honour and the right to mint coinage. According to historian Rajmohan Gandhi, by accepting the title of Raja from Durrani, Ala Singh became the first Sikh monarch in history and, by 1765, the most powerful Sikh in Punjab. During his time as the ruler of Patiala, Singh's territory also extended to Karnal and Thanesar.

=== Policies and administration ===
Singh and other Sikh leaders were noted for forming beneficial alliances and gaining concessions from more powerful empires that were competing for dominance in Punjab. However, during his time as the Raja of Patiala, Singh was particularly noted for being shrewd and cunning in his foreign policy and military policy. He managed to simultaneously maintain cordial relations with the Mughal Empire, Maratha Confederacy, Durrani Empire and the Dal Khalsa, all whom were competing for power and dominance in Punjab. However, Singh's foreign and military policies were criticised by and angered the Dal Khalsa. In early 1765, the Dal Khalsa, angered by Singh's relations with the Durrani Empire and his royal titles, attacked Patiala State. Patiala's army and the Dal Khalsa's army clashed in Patiala State's northern territories; however, peace was quickly brokered by Jassa Singh Ahluwalia, the leader of the Dal Khalsa. Singh's military policies involved building and maintaining fortresses in strategic locations. During Singh's ruler, the Patiala army consisted primarily of horseback cavalry and artillery that was transported by camels.

Singh's administration was secular, and he had Sikhs, Hindus and Muslims in high administrative positions. Having seen several famines in his lifetime, Singh focused extensively on agriculture, land management and cultivation. His extensive cultivation efforts led to the founding, rehabilitation, resettlement, and reclamation of many villages, ultimately resulting in the conquest of other villages and significantly increasing agricultural output. This not only boosted his finances and provided surplus grains for future emergencies but also secured the loyalty of the inhabitants of his territories. Singh's agricultural success enabled him to support political allies with provisions during critical times, which included the Mughal Emperor Alamgir II in 1758 and the Maratha Confederacy during the Third Battle of Panipat in 1761.

== Death and succession ==
On 7 August 1765, Singh died of a fever at the age of 74. He was succeeded by his grandson Amar Singh, who later gained the title Raja-e Rajgan, his three sons having predeceased him. Sardaul Singh the eldest died in 1753, Bhumian Singh died in 1742 and Lal Singh the youngest died in 1748.

== Legacy ==
Singh's descendants were the rulers of Patiala until 1947, when India gained independence from the British Empire. His descendants who had royal titles retained them until 1971, when they were abolished through the 26th Amendment to the Constitution of India.

== Gallery ==
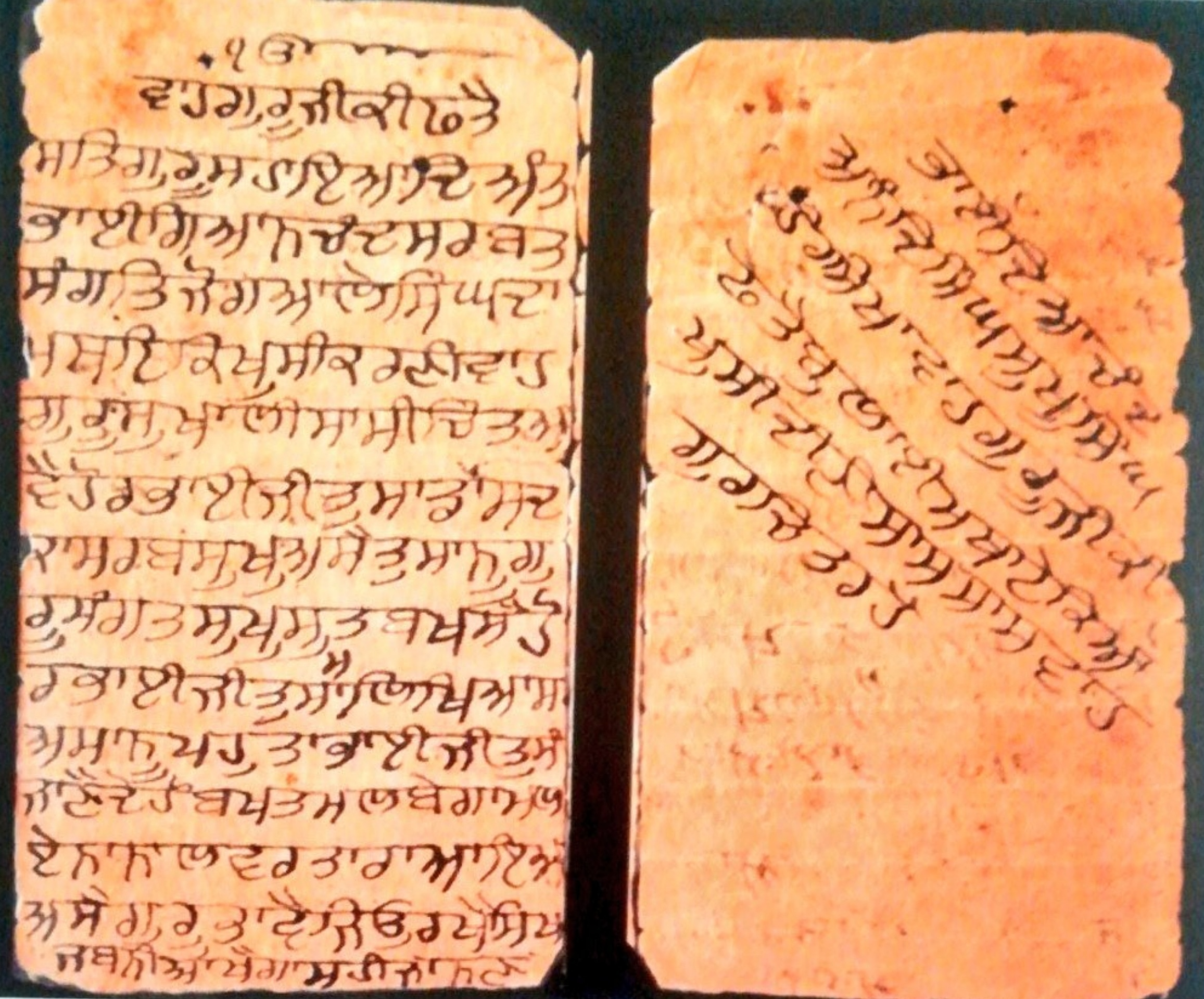
Letter written by Baba Ala Singh of Patiala

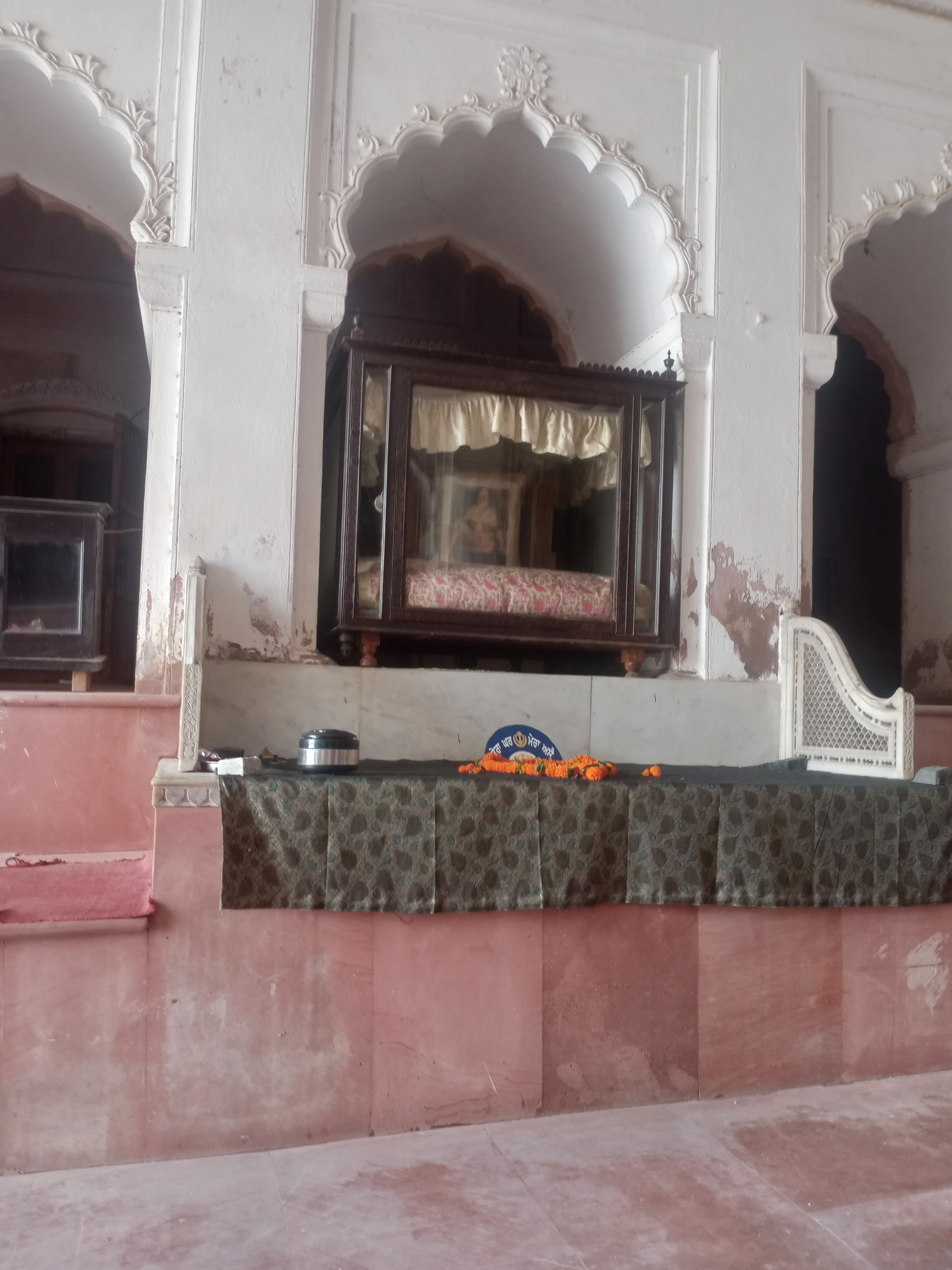
Darbar of Baba Ala Singh in Patiala

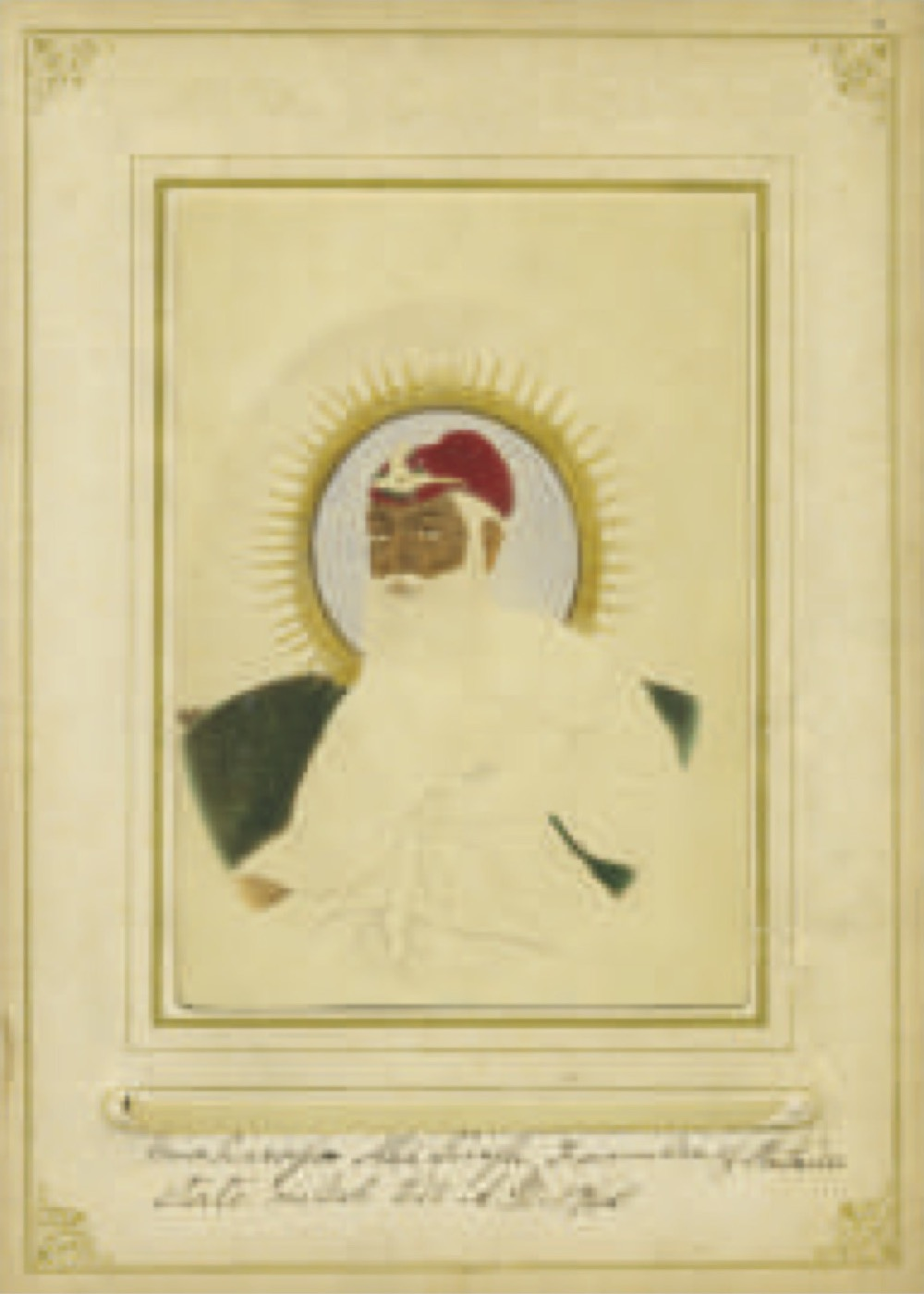
Maharaja Ala Singh, founder of Patiala state, ruled until 1765. The portrait is from a set of portraits of six maharajas (rulers) of Patiala State, late 19th century
