= Kotla, Punjab =

Kotla
- Village
- Location in Punjab, India Kotla (India)
- Coordinates: 31.5065139°N 75.7286366°E
- Country: India
- State: Punjab
- District: Jalandhar

Government
  - Type: Panchayat raj
  - Body: Gram panchayat
- Elevation: 240 m (790 ft)

Languages
  - Official: Punjabi
- Time zone: UTC+5:30 (IST)
- ISO 3166 code: IN-PB
- Website: jalandhar.nic.in

Kotla is a village that is located in the Jalandhar district of Punjab State, India. It is located 35 kilometres (22 mi) from district headquarter Jalandhar and 161 kilometres (100 mi) from state capital Chandigarh. Kotla village, which is known for its agriculture markets.

The village is administrated by a sarpanch, who is an elected representative of the village as per the Panchayati Raj.

== See also ==
- List of villages in India
