= Bibi Sahib Kaur =

Princess of Patiala (1771–1801)

Sahib Kaur
- Princess
- Born: 1771
- Died: 1801 (aged 29–30)
- Spouse: Jaimal Singh
- Issue: Chand Kaur (stepdaugther)
- Dynasty: Phulkian dynasty
- Father: Amar Singh
- Religion: Sikhism

Rajkumari Bibi Sahib Kaur (1771–1801) was a Sikh princess of Patiala and the elder sister of Sahib Singh, the Raja-e-Rajgan of Patiala. (Note: She is also known as 'Rani Sahib Kaur'.) Sahib Kaur served as Patiala's Prime Minister and the General of the Patiala Army. She is remembered for her leadership in protecting the Patiala kingdom from Marathas in the late-18th century, alongside Rani Rajinder Kaur.

== Biography ==
Sahib Kaur was born in 1771. Kaur was the daughter of Amar Singh, the Raja-e-Rajgan of Patiala, her mother was the first wife of Amar Singh named Raj Kaur (daughter of Chaudhry Ram Ditta Mal of Gagewal), and she was the sister of Sahib Singh, who succeeded their father as the ruler of Patiala. She was also the great-granddaughter of Mai Fatto. At the age of 7, she was married to Jaimal Singh of Fateh Garh Churian (Gurdaspur district), son of Haqiqat Singh of the Kanhaiya Misl. At a young-age, Sahib Kaur learnt horse-riding, archery, and fencing and was educated in Sikhism. When her brother, Sahib Singh, was baptized into the Khalsa order by Sardar Baghel Singh in 1779 at Patiala, Sahib Kaur was also baptized alongside her brother. Later, her husband Jaimal, was imprisoned by his cousin, Fateh Singh, and she successfully led an assault to liberate him and also restored him to his leadership of Fatehgarh. In 1782, her brother succeeded as the next ruler of Patiala after their father's death. However, due to personal shortcomings of Sahib Singh, such as being prone to fits-of-madness, he was not able to rule effectively, relying much on his diwan Nanu Mal, whom was cunning. Nanu Mal was a trader from Sunam who had a personal dislike for the Sikh religion and Dal Khalsa. He removed Sikhs from their positions and replaced them with nepotistic appointments and would smoke hookah in the durbar, which the Sikhs disliked. Sahib Singh's grandmother, Hukma Kaur, also interfered with the running of the state. Nanu Mal was able to effectively hold the true power in the state due to the inability of Sahib Singh and by stirring-up factionalism within the court, which is shown by Nanu Mal imprisoning general Basant Rai, a favourite of Sahib Singh. In 1789, Nanu Mal invited the Marathas to invade Patiala. However, in the ensuing conflict that followed Nanu Mal died in 1792. Nanu Mal's position was soon after occupied by Meer Ilahi Bakhsh of Samana but he was killed by a Sikh in the court in-front of Sahib Singh. The situation in the state deteriorated due to corruption, the chaliwan famine, and internal strife, which prompted Sahib Kaur in Fatehgarh to request her husband's permission to assist her brother in its administration.

At the age of 22, Kaur's brother, Sahib Singh, recalled her after her marriage and appointed her Prime Minister of Patiala State in 1793. Immediately after appointment, forts were repaired, the new fortresses of Ratian and Raj Garh were constructed, and the military was restructured. Kaur led armies into battle and succeeded in uniting other Sikh Confederacy Misls and their leaders, including Baghel Singh, founder of the Singh Krora Misl, for military campaigns. She was one of the leaders in the Maratha-Sikh clashes against the Maratha Empire. One of the battles she fought in was the Battle of Mardanpur in 1794.

Between 1798 and 1799, Kaur battled and defeated George Thomas, an Irish adventurer. Thomas had carved out an independent territory for himself, which included the then towns of Hansi and Hisar, and was looking to expand his territory. Thomas later attacked Jind, and the then Raja of Jind, Bhag Singh, sent a letter to request aid from Sahib Singh or for Sahib Singh to send his sister, Kaur, to aid him. Kaur came to Bhag Singh's aid, defeating Thomas in battle and then brokered a settlement between Thomas and other Sikh leaders.

Sahib Singh later imprisoned Kaur and she died in 1801. Other sources give her date of death as 1799. Kaur's stepdaughter, through her husband Jaimal Singh's other marriage, was Chand Kaur, who served as the Regent of the Sikh Empire and was the wife of Maharaja Kharak Singh and the mother of Maharaja Nau Nihal Singh. Kharak Singh was the son of Maharaja Ranjit Singh, the founder of the Sikh Empire.

== See also ==
- Sada Kaur
