= Najaf Quli Khan =

Mirza Najaf Quli Khan
- Mirza; Saif-ud-Daula

Nawab of Kanud, Gurgaon, Rohtak & Rewari
- Reign: 17 March 1780 – 23 August 1791
- Predecessor: Post Established
- Successor: Daughter of Zabita Khan

Mir Bakhshi of Mughal Empire
- Reign: Jan 1788 – 23 August 1791
- Predecessor: Mirza Najaf Khan

Faujdar of Saharanpur and Muzzafarnagar
- Reign: 1777 – 1782
- Born: Mughal Empire
- Died: 1791; Kanud
- Spouses: Daughter of Zabita Khan (m. 1777) Daughter of Vizier Majad ud Daula (m. 1778)
- House: Rathore
- Religion: Sunni Islam
- Military career
- Rank: Mir Bakhshi
- Conflicts: Jat-Mughal war of 1775-76; Battle of Barsana; Capture of Deeg (1776); Rohilla Rebellion (1777); Conquest of Kanud(1779-1780); Siege of Kanud(1788-1789)

Nawab Saif-ud-Daula Najaf Quli Khan (died 23 August 1791) was a Mughal military commander during the reign of Shah Alam II. An adopted son of Mirza Najaf Khan, he was active during the period when the Mughal power in northern India was in a state of absolute decline.

== Biography ==
Born in a Rathore Rajput family, Najaf Quli converted to Islam and quickly rose to high position under the patronage of Mirza Najaf Khan as one of his lieutenants. During 1775/76 Mirza was involved in a prolonged war against the Jats of Bharatpur in modern-day Haryana, who were in an open rebellion against the Mughal government. In 1775 the Jat army supported by a 5,000-strong contingent of Begum Samru was defeated by Najaf Quli Khan in the battle of Barsana, and the territories of Gurgaon, Rewari, Jhajjar, Narnaul and Ballabhgarh were annexed by Mirza. By March 1776 the Jat capital of Dig had been captured as well.

Soon Mirza Najaf Khan, now the Mir Bakhshi, had to focus his attention towards the Rohilla Afghans who under Zabita Khan Yousafzai for long had been a thorn for the Mughals. Zabita Khan's father Najib-ud-Daula Yousafzai had been the de facto ruler of Delhi as the regent of the emperor until his death in 1770. Mirza accompanied with 5000 soldiers and artillery arrived at Panipat where he fought against Zabita Khan and his Sikh allies on 14 September 1777. The battle went on until night. The next day Sikh allies of Zabita Khan fled to Sirhind and Zabita Khan was forced to sign peace treaty with Mirza. As a part of peace treaty Mirza Najaf Khan married the sister of Zabita Khan while Zabita Khan's daughter (the sister of Ghulam Kadir) was married to Najaf Quli Khan. In return his estates were restored to him. After the victory Najaf Quli was appointed faujdar of Saharanpur and Muzaffarnagar with his capital at Ghausgarh.

In 1778 Najaf Quli married the daughter of the Kashmiri vizier of Mughal Empire, Majad-ud-Daula. In November 1779 Najaf Quli marched against the Raja of Kanud fort, Balwant Singh who had captured some of villages belonging to his estates and after treacherously massacring him along with 30 of his nobles, captured the fort on 17 March 1780. Najaf Quli made Kanud as his new stronghold and carved out a principality for him consisting of Mewat and Shekhawati regions. Najaf Quli later declared himself to be independent ruler of Gurgaon, Rewari, Jhajjar, Narnaul and Rohtak, with Gokalgarh as capital.

After the death of Mirza Najaf Khan in April 1782, Delhi became a scene of civil war among his four generals and ultimately all except Najaf Quli got killed. Shah Alam ultimately invited Mahadaji Shinde as the regent. In 1785 Najaf Quli was sent by Mahadaji to Jaipur to realise the tribute. In January 1788 Najaf Quli met Shah Alam and put forward his claims over the territories of Gokulgarh and Rewari as well as over the position of Mir Bakhshi. Shah Alam was forced to please him and confirmed him on his holdings.

In October 1788 Mirza Ismail Beg was sent by Mahadaji Shinde to take away control of his principality. Ismail Beg conquered Gurgaon and Rewari but could not capture Kanud itself, and ultimately abandoned its siege on 27 November 1789. In May 1790 Najaf Quli was restored his estates by Mahadaji in return for his help to defeat Ismail Beg, who had now become the enemy of the Marathas. Ismail Beg was ultimately forced to flee. Najaf Quli died on 23 August 1791 at Kanud. After his death his widow (the daughter of Zabita Khan) gained control of his principality until she died in March 1792 from a cannon ball shot, and the principality was annexed by Mahadaji.
