= Jivbadada Kerkar =

Maratha military administrator (1740–1796)

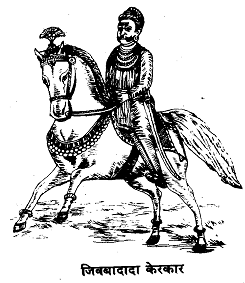
- Born: Jivba Ganesh Kerkar; 1740; Keri, Ponda taluka, Portuguese Goa
- Died: January 6, 1796 (aged 55–56); Jambgaon, Maratha Empire
- Military career
- Allegiance: Maratha Empire
- Service years: 1761–1796
- Rank: Senapati (Commander-in-Chief)
- Unit: Shinde (Scindia) infantry
- Commands: Forces of Mahadji Shinde
- Conflicts: Third Battle of Panipat; Maratha–Mysore War (against Tipu Sultan); Campaigns against Rajputs and Jats; Defense of Delhi (against Ghulam Kadir); Battle against the Nizam of Hyderabad
- Awards: Bakshibahadur Fatehjung Samshherjang Bahadur

Jivbadada Kerkar (1740 – 6 January 1796), also known as Jivba Ganesh Kerkar and Bakshi Bahadur Jivbadada Kerkar, was a prominent military administrator and diplomat who served the Maratha Empire under the Shinde dynasty. He is particularly noted for his service to Mahadji Shinde and played a crucial role in the Maratha politics of the late 18th century.

== Early life ==
Jivba Ganesh Kerkar was born in 1740. He belonged to a family originally from Pedne. His grandfather was Vithal Shenvi Sanzgiri and his father was Ganesh. Jivbadada was the eldest of three brothers, the others being Balwant and Ramkrishna. The family had moved to the village of Keri, located in the Ponda taluka of Portuguese Goa. Following the death of his father, he was raised by his uncle, Balwant. He spent his early childhood in Keri and received his primary education at home. At the age of sixteen, he moved to Kolhapur for further studies, where he learned Sanskrit and developed an interest in physical exercise.

== Career ==
Around 1761, Kerkar moved to Poona and began working for the Barve family, who were sardars under the Peshwa. He was later appointed as the head of the Barve infantry. His military career saw significant action during the Peshwa campaigns. At the age of 21, he accompanied Sadashivrao Bhau during the northern campaigns and fought in the Third Battle of Panipat.

Following the battle, Nanasaheb Peshwa sent him to assist Mahadji Shinde. Shinde, recognizing Kerkar's bravery and intelligence, eventually appointed him as his Commander-in-Chief (Senapati). Kerkar was involved in several military engagements involving the Rajputs, Jats, and the forces of Tipu Sultan. He defended Delhi against Ghulam Kadir. His successes earned him titles from the Mughal Emperor, including "Bakshibahadur Fatehjung" and "Samshherjang Bahadur."

Kerkar was a trusted advisor and the "right hand" of Mahadji Shinde and led the conflct against the Nizam of Hyderabad on behalf of Madhavrao II (Sawai Madhavrao), who honoured with a jeweled sword for his success. Following the death of Sawai Madhavrao, he supported the installation of Bajirao II as the Peshwa.

== Death ==
Jivbadada Kerkar died on 6 January 1796 at Jambgaon.

== Legacy ==
Records indicate that he participated in approximately 175 battles during his lifetime. He is remembered as a loyal and capable general who helped consolidate Shinde power in North India.

The Bakshi Bahaddar Jivbada Kerkar award, Goa's highest state award for sports, is named after him.
