= Rajuri =

Village in Maharashtra

Rajuri bhagtanchi rajuri
- village
- Nickname: sagte yekach rajuri
- Location in Maharashtra, India Rajuri (India)
- Country: India
- State: Maharashtra
- District: Solapur district

Languages/ marathi /Hindi/English
  - Official: Marathi
- Time zone: UTC+5:30 (IST)

Rajuri is a village in the Karmala taluka of Solapur district in Maharashtra state, India.

== Demographics ==
Covering 2,405 hectares (5,940 acres) and comprising 721 households at the time of the 2011 census of India, Rajuri had a population of 3173. There were 1649 males and 1524 females, with 337 people being aged six or younger.
