= Rane Khan =

- Nickname: Bhai
- Died: 1789 Bharatpur, Rajasthan, Maratha Empire
- Allegiance: Maratha Empire: Gwalior State
- Rank: Commander in Chief
- Conflicts: Afghan–Maratha War: Battle of Panipat; Capture of Delhi; Maratha–Rajput Wars: Battle of Lalsot

Rane Khan was a prominent Bhishti Muslim chief who was prominent in the Maratha empire.

== Life ==
Rane Khan was the son of Fateh Khan, who was a resident of Deopur in the Deccan. During the Third Battle of Panipat, Rane Khan saved the life of Mahadaji Shinde about whose position he knew nothing and took him to a safe town. Shinde called him "Bhai" or brother, and appointed him to a responsible position in his army. Soon Rane Khan was appointed as his commander-in-chief. In 1787, Rane Khan defeated the Mughal army under Ismail Beg. Sindhia appointed his able general Rane Khan at the head of a large force, supported by Jiva Dad Bakhshi. On September 28, 1788, Rane Khan occupied the Old city of Delhi. Rane Khan caught Ghulam Qadir and cut off his head, sending the body to Shah Alam II. After the death of Ghulam Qadir, as his family had taken refuge with the Sikhs with their wealth, an army under Rane Khan, Ali Bahadur Khan and Kesho Rao used this reason as a pretext to launch an expedition against the Sikhs at Patiala. A sum of fifty thousand was paid to avert the threat. Rane Khan died at Bharatpur in 1788. The descendants of Rane Khan continued to hold Jagirs and act as noblemen at the Gwalior state.
