= Isma'il Beg =

Mughal military commander (died 1794)

- Born: before 1738; Iran
- Died: March 1794
- Military career
- Allegiance: Mughal Empire
- Service years: 1767–1788
- Conflicts: Capture of Delhi (1788)

Mirza Ismail Beg Hamdani (died March 1794) was a Mughal military commander of Persian origin. A son of Mirza Munim Beg and a kinsman of Mirza Najaf Khan, he along with his family fled Persia after the rise of Nadir Shah.

== Biography ==
Arriving in India many members of his family including him rose to high positions in the Mughal Empire. Initially a stalwart of the Marathas he defected in 1790, threatened by the rising power of Mahadaji Shinde in the Mughal court. He was defeated by the Marathas at the Battle of Patan whereafter he fled to the Rajput kingdom of Jaipur and thereafter to Jodhpur. He later went to Kanaud, now known as Mahendragarh, upon the offer of the widow of Najaf Quli Khan to marry her. Despite her initial approval, she later chose not to marry him and opposed his entry in the fort. Ismail Beg fled to Madhogarh and when the Marathas received this intel, Khande Rao marched against him. Ismail Beg was captured in 1792 and imprisoned thereafter in Agra Fort by the Maratha general Mahadaji Shinde. He was put to death by the orders of Mughal emperor Shah Alam II in March 1794.
