= Mirza Shafi's campaign against Sikhs =

Imperial Campaign Against the Sikhs
- Part of Fall of the Mughal Empire
Date	February – June 1781
Location	Cis-Satluj region, Karnal district, Upper Doab (present-day Haryana and Uttar Pradesh, India)
Result	Strategic Mughal failure: Peace agreement of July 1781; Sikhs formally confirmed in possession of estates north of Panipat; Sikhs granted rakhi rights across the Panipat–Delhi corridor and Upper Doab; Gajpat Singh of Jind awarded title of Maharajah; Cease of Sikh raids; Mughal forces withdraw from Haryana; Recognition of Sikh Supremacy over the Punjab, Haryana and Upper Doab

Belligerents
Mughal Empire: Maratha auxiliaries (Bagha Rao); Rohilla contingent (Ghulam Qadir); Allied (nominal): Patiala and Jind states	Sikh Confederacy: Singh Krora Misl; Ahluwalia Misl; Faizullapuria Misl; Nakai Misl; Dallewalia Misl; Multiple allied sardars

Commanders and leaders
Mirza Najaf Khan (Mir Bakshi); Mirza Shafi (field commander); Zain-ul-Abidin Khan; Mir Mansur; Ghulam Qadir; Bagha Rao; Ismail Beg; Gajpat Singh of Jind	Baghel Singh; Jassa Singh Ahluwalia; Tara Singh Ghaiba; Bhag Singh Ahluwalia; Lehna Singh Bhangi; Haqiqat Singh Kanhaiya; Diwan Singh; Karam Singh; Rae Singh; Mohar Singh

Strength
~10,000-40,000 troops Multiple sepoy battalions Artillery (cannon and camel-mounted guns)	Guerrilla cavalry forces Up to 5,000 Horsemen

Casualties and losses
est.: 10,000–15,000 killed	In Total: ~1,000 Sikhs killed

Mirza Shafi's campaign against Sikhs or the Imperial campaign against the Sikhs was a Mughal campaign led by Mirza Muhammad Shafi Khan against Sikh chiefs in the Cis-Satluj region from February to June 1781. It formed part of the Mughal attempt under Mirza Najaf Khan to restore authority, collect tribute, and check Sikh activity in the country around Karnal, Ambala, the Yamuna, and the upper Ganga Doab.

The campaign began after Shafi's earlier operations in the Doab and after fighting in which Sahib Singh Khondah was supposodely killed. Shafi entered Sikh territory on 25 February 1781 and encamped at Radaur, but Sikh forces avoided a single decisive engagement and relied on mobile attacks, pressure on imperial posts, and raids across the Yamuna into the Doab. Although Shafi gained temporary successes at Indri and in a night attack on a Sikh camp, his army suffered from shortage of money, lack of reinforcements, desertion, and the inability of the Delhi government to protect the Doab from Sikh incursions.

By the end of the campaign, Shahabad had been retaken by the Sikhs, Sadhaura and other Mughal posts had been abandoned, and Shafi had fallen back toward Kunjpura. The failure led Najaf Khan to negotiate through Zabita Khan and Gajpat Singh of Jind. In July 1781, Gajpat Singh's tribute was fixed, he was granted the title of Maharaja, and a settlement was reached under which the Sikhs agreed not to raid imperial territory, while their possession of estates north of Panipat and their right to levy rakhi in specified areas were confirmed.

== Background ==
The Sikh advance into the upper Doab followed the failure of the imperial campaign against Patiala in October 1779. The imperial government was temporarily weakened by political changes at Delhi after Mirza Najaf Khan rose to the regency, but by January 1780 his grand-nephew Mirza Muhammad Shafi was sent to the Doab with 10,000 men and artillery to protect the province and its crops. Shafi first operated from Meerut and attacked local landlords who had used the Sikh incursion to withhold obedience from the Mughal government. On 10 February 1780 he advanced through Barnawa and sacked the village of Sup after fighting there.

By late 1780, the Cis-Satluj Sikh chiefs were divided by local conflicts. Amar Singh of Patiala was fighting Bhai Desu Singh of Kaithal, who was supported by Sahib Singh Khondah, Dulcha Singh, and Bhag Singh were also involved in fighting with Thaneswar. Both sides appealed to Shafi, and Najaf Khan allowed him to choose whichever alliance seemed most useful to the Delhi government. Shafi and Zabita Khan reached Bidauli on 9 November 1780, where Sikh chiefs including Sahib Singh and his allies discussed terms with them.

The Mughal commanders later crossed to the western bank of the Jamuna and halted at Kunjpura. Shafi imprisoned Gajpat Singh and three other Sikh chiefs to extract money from them, a policy that Zabita Khan opposed because of his ties to the Sikhs. Zabita Khan returned to Delhi with his own contingent on 10 December, leaving Shafi with reduced strength. Sikh raiding parties then entered Saharanpur district, and Shafi made a forced march from Kunjpura into the Doab.

The Sikh raiders gathered near Saharanpur but were defeated by Shafi's artillery and trained sepoys. Sahib Singh Khondah was killed, several Sikh chiefs were wounded, and many Sikhs drowned while crossing the Jamuna during the retreat. A different version attributed to Francklin placed the battle at Meerut on 15 August 1781 and gave Sikh losses at about 5,000, but the Hari Ram Gupta and Jadunath Sarkar note that contemporary mid-August records do not mention such an action.

== Campaign ==
After the earlier fighting, Shafi returned to Sikh territory in the Karnal district. The Sikhs chose guerrilla tactics and continued raids across the Yamuna to show that Shafi's previous success had not stopped them from entering the Doab. On 25 February 1781, Shafi encamped at Radaur, north of Karnal and west of the Yamuna. He was attacked by 150 Sikh horsemen, who later withdrew. On 27 February, while Shafi remained at Radaur, the Sikhs camped four kos away, and Diwan Singh and Baghel Singh sent him a letter stating that his presence was damaging crops and that he would be responsible for the losses.

On 28 February, Shafi left Radaur and was attacked on the march. About seventy men were killed and wounded on both sides, and local inhabitants fled toward the Sirmur hills. On 3 March, following Dalel Khan's advice, Shafi decided to establish a camp at Sikandra. His troops had marched only a short distance when the Sikhs attacked. Zain-ul-Abidin Khan and Bagha Rao Maratha fought in the engagement, the Sikhs withdrew after losing eight horses, while carrying off two camels and six ponies. About twenty men on both sides were killed or wounded.

=== Operations around Nikobat and Buriya ===
On 4 March, Shafi moved to Nikobat, described as the residence of Rae Singh Bhangi and Bhag Singh of Thaneswar. Several skirmishes took place on the march, and the Sikhs later camped about ten kilometres from him. The Sikh inhabitants of Nikobat fled with their families and property to Jamalgarh.

Shafi remained at Nikobat for about a week, during which daily skirmishing continued. On 6 March he received ammunition from Najaf Khan, after which the Sikhs moved their camp farther away. On 7 March it was reported that Diwan Singh's representative told Sher Din Khan that the Sikhs would not raid the Ganga Doab if Shafi immediately returned to his own country. Ghulam Qadir, the son of Zabita Khan, attacked places where cultivators from Sikh territory had taken refuge, collected booty, and later joined Shafi.

On 9 March Sikh troopers attempted to seize cattle from the imperial camp. Four or five men were killed or wounded in the resulting action. Later that day the Sikhs appeared near Shafi's camp, and Shafi marched out with a battalion and three cannon. The Sikhs withdrew after losing twenty-five men, and Shafi pursued them for three kos.

During the night of 11–12 March, the Sikhs attacked Shafi and carried off 3,000 cattle. On 12 March Shafi marched toward Buriya, was attacked on the way, and dispersed the attackers with artillery fire before encamping at Nakri.

=== Patiala's attempted intervention ===
Raja Amar Singh of Patiala offered assistance to Shafi while Shafi was under pressure. On 17 March 1781, Chain Singh, Amar Singh's representative, visited Shafi and received gifts, while a five-piece khilat was sent for Amar Singh. Chain Singh was instructed to bring money and reinforcements.

On 25 March, Chain Singh reported that Amar Singh's troops had left Patiala and were marching toward Ambala. The Sikh chiefs prevented these troops from joining Shafi. Jassa Singh Ahluwalia entered Patiala territory on 28 March, Karam Singh and Tara Singh Ghaiba intercepted Amar Singh's contingent, and other Sikh forces blocked the route at Ambala. Amar Singh recalled the contingent, while Sikh forces continued to plunder in Patiala territory. Amar Singh's representative then offered money, after which the Sikhs withdrew toward Malerkotla and then Khanna, where Amar Singh agreed to meet Jassa Singh to settle terms.

=== Continued advance towards Saudhaura ===
While Shafi was at Buria, the Sikh camp was at Kharvan, north of Buria. On 18 March Shafi marched there, but the Sikhs evacuated the place and moved farther away. Shafi was attacked during the march and drove the attackers away with artillery. On 19 March he moved from Kharvan to Balchhappar on the Chittang stream, where the Sikhs had been halting, but they again withdrew.

According to Gupta, the significant disunity in the Sikh camp probably explains why they opted to harass Shafi rather than directly attack his forces. Diwan Singh and Gurdit Singh left the Sikh camp and moved toward Sikandra because of differences with other Sikh chiefs. On 21 March, Gajpat Singh of Jind promised to pay the balance of his tribute within a week and received gifts together with his Diwan.

=== Disaffection in Shafi's army ===
By late March, Shafi's army faced severe financial strain. No revenue could be collected from Sikh territory because inhabitants had fled, no money had arrived from Delhi, and Sikh attacks were causing continuing losses. Ghulam Qadir was dissatisfied because his troops had not been paid, and Shafi attempted to conciliate him with gifts. Grain and gunpowder arrived from Sadhaura, but Banjaras carrying grain were plundered by Mohar Singh.

On 25 March, Shafi moved from Balchhappar and camped near Mustafabad, which the Sikhs had left after handing the fort to the local Qazi. Shafi appointed Sher Din Khan Mandal officer of Shahabad and sent a letter to the Raja of Nahan asking him not to shelter Sikhs. Najaf Quli warned Shafi that the army was becoming disaffected, and Shafi tried to satisfy him with promises of parganahs and a doshala.

On 30 March, Shafi marched back to Sikandra under pressure from Sikh attacks, raids in the Doab, and unrest in his camp. Two battalions under Gangaram and Bhawani Singh openly revolted over unpaid dues, refused to leave Mustafabad, and stayed behind. Shafi sent Shuja Khan to persuade them to join him and offered to pay one month's salary from Gajpat Singh's tribute.

On 31 March, Shafi ordered local zamindars to pay revenue and threatened to harvest their crops and confiscate grain if they did not comply. Reports also reached him that fighting had broken out at Sadhaura between Ismail Beg and the Sikhs, and he sent 200 horse and foot as reinforcement. On 1 April, the Sikhs attacked the amil of Buria and withdrew before reinforcements arrived and one infantry jamadar was killed. On 2 April, Shafi demolished the forts of Daulat Singh and Diwan Singh and established his own thana at Sikandra.

=== Fighting at Indri ===
On 4 April, Shafi sent Mir Mansur and five other chiefs to Indri from his camp on the Chittang stream. They plundered Husainpur, expelled Baghel Singh's military post from Indri, and stationed troops there with camel artillery, long firelocks, and grain. On 6 April, Mir Mansur fought the Sikhs near Indri. The Sikh force left its horses in nearby jungle and fought on foot.

Mir Mansur was reinforced by 3,000 Afghans from Karnal and Kunjpura, and the battalions of Sayyid Ali and Shaikh Haidar later opened artillery fire on the Sikhs from the rear. Mir Mansur and Shaikh Haidar lost their horses in the fighting. The Sikhs left 150 dead, including Ratan Singh, while the Mughal side lost thirty killed and fifty wounded. The Sikhs withdrew to Radaur, and the Mughal posts at Indri and Husainpur were maintained.

Najaf Khan sent robes and gifts to Shafi, Zain-ul-Abidin Khan, Mir Mansur, and subordinate chiefs after hearing of the success at Indri. It is also noted that Najaf Khan had not been able to supply Shafi with money or stop Sikh activity in the Doab.

=== Night attack on a Sikh camp ===
On the night of 8 April, Shafi and Zain-ul-Abidin Khan attempted to attack a Sikh camp. Villagers warned the Sikhs, who broke camp, but Shafi's forces overtook them. In the action, 150 Sikhs were killed and 50 captured and Shafi's forces also seized 100 horses, 200 ponies, and 150 camels. The village of Biana was plundered and its cattle taken by Mughal troops.

On 9 April, Zain-ul-Abidin Khan arrested inhabitants of villages that had warned the Sikhs about Shafi's night movement and had them blown from a cannon. Ghulam Qadir was also ordered to devastate villages that had not cooperated with Shafi during the attack.

=== Operations at Shahabad and Sadhaura ===
On 14 April, Shafi moved from the Sikandra area to Mustafabad. Mirza Saidu complained that the Sikhs had plundered his village and that local zamindars and villagers were unable to resist them. On 17 April, Shafi moved to Kabutar Khera and sent Mir Mansur and Sher Din Khan to establish posts near Sadhaura.

On 20 April, Khalil Beg Khan seized Shahabad, south of Ambala, but his troops were continually harassed by the Sikhs. On 23 April, he reported that 200 Sikhs were near Shahabad and that five zamindars had been wounded outside the town, requesting a battalion and two cannon.

On 25 April, Shafi moved from Kabutar Khera to Sadhaura after sending Zain-ul-Abidin Khan to reassure Ghulam Qadir, who was discouraged by lack of funds. On 26 April, Sher Din Khan and Bagha Rao brought money from Kunjpura to Sadhaura, and it was distributed among the troops. Shafi then retreated to Bilaspur. On 27 April, he received Rs. 25,000 from Gajpat Singh of Jind and distributed it among the soldiers. He also fixed a tribute of Rs. 17,000 on the Raja of Nahan and Rs. 7,000 on the zamindars of Indri.

== Sikh raids in the Ganga Doab ==
The Sikh response to Shafi's entry into their territory included repeated raids into the Doab. On 25 February, the same day Shafi entered Sikh territory, 1,000 Sikhs crossed the Yamuna into Shafi's rear and drove away 2,000 cattle from Kot. Shafi sent two battalions and two cannon in pursuit. On 27 February, more Sikhs crossed into the Doab, carried off cattle from Lakhnauti, and moved to Bidauli.

After concentrating for about a month on fighting Shafi, Sikh raids resumed near the end of March. On 29 March, 200 men under Gurdit Singh of Ladwa raided the Doab and carried off cattle from Garhi Bhai Khan, also called Garhi Duhtar. On 2 April, Gurdit Singh plundered a village near Meerut and killed or wounded several people.

=== Mughal response in the Doab ===
Shafi repeatedly asked Najaf Khan to drive the Sikhs out of the Doab because the raids were increasing unrest among his own troops. On 2 April, Najaf Khan sent an infantry battalion and 400 horse under Kajjar Farangi and Qalandar Singh, instructing them to join Shafi if needed. On 7 April, Najaf Khan ordered Mirza Jafar to proceed to Saharanpur with 3,000 horse and foot and two cannon, but Jafar was unwilling to serve under Shafi because of personal differences, and Najaf Khan did not insist.

Najaf Khan also consulted the astrologer Opat, who predicted that the Sikhs would fight Shafi on 16, 22, and 24 April and on 4 May, and that the imperial forces would ultimately be victorious.

=== Sikh Waves of destruction ===
On 8 April, another Sikh force crossed the Yamuna and plundered Gangoh and several other villages. They halted west of Shamli, where two men were killed in fighting, and then returned while plundering a village and taking cattle on the way. Kajjar was at Kandhla but did not engage them. On 10 April, the Sikhs moved toward Shamli and the local chaudhri paid money for karah prashad, and the town avoided an attack. Another Sikh contingent plundered Husainpur and later entered Budhana, where twelve Afghan houses were plundered and the rest of the town was spared after paying Rs. 4,000.

On 12 April, the Sikhs advanced farther south, sacked Baghpat, laid waste Khekra, and intercepted letters from Najaf Khan to Shafi, causing alarm in Delhi. On 13 April, Ghulam Qadir Khan detached 500 horse to protect his territories in the Doab. Najaf Khan summoned Najaf Quli Khan for an expedition and offered Rs. 50,000, but Najaf Quli demanded a jagir worth one lakh of rupees.

The Sikhs attacked Sardhana, the estate of Begum Samru, then stormed Mawana and forced its amil to pay tribute. They also reached Muradnagar and plundered it. Begum Samru's representative asked Najaf Khan for assistance, but Najaf Khan's officers would not march without two months' salary in advance, and he had no funds to pay them.

On 16 April, the Sikhs attacked Shahdara and Patparganj, the suburbs of Delhi, and residents fled. Begum Samru sent troops and guns to protect her villages, while alarm spread as far as Rewari. Another Sikh body attacked Shaikhpura Barnawa, wounded the local amil, plundered and burned the village, and established a post there. The Sikhs then attacked Bamnauli and imposed Rs. 400 and a horse as rakhi. Three nearby villages were laid waste, while the Gosains of Rampur resisted a Sikh force of 2,500.

On 18 April, the Sikhs besieged Jasar Kot. The villagers fought them, and the Sikhs lost forty to fifty men before withdrawing. The village powder magazine then caught fire and destroyed the village and when villagers fled on horseback, the Sikhs attacked them and plundered their property. A body of 500 Sikhs carried off cattle from Dhakauli, while another force attacked Meerut, withdrew in the afternoon, and halted west of the city with booty.

On 19 April, the Sikhs were encamped east of the Kali River near Sardhana and controlled the area between Meerut and Budhana. They plundered a chariot and eight horsemen travelling from Shikarpur and then sought information about Jamuna crossings. On 20 April, 400 Sikhs crossed the Yamuna into their own territory with booty, reaching Dhin and Manglaur, where they began selling plundered property. A separate report stated that 1,000 Sikhs were moving toward Hardwar.

On 24 April, another body of 500 Sikhs crossed the Yamuna, 300 of them carrying booty. Mir Mansur attacked them and was wounded in the left arm, while his horse was also wounded. Mir Baqar, Mir Kalian, Inayat Ali, and several jamadars were killed and about twenty men in all were killed or wounded. The Sikhs carried off fifteen horses, while four Sikh heads were brought into the imperial camp.

These Sikh incursions into the Doab are referred to as the "Sikh Waves of Destruction", as the primary objective of these punitive expeditions was to inflict widespread havoc and devastation, compelling the Mughal forces to withdraw from Sikh-controlled territory.

== Mughal command disputes in the Doab ==
Najaf Khan blamed Zabita Khan for the failure to check the Sikhs in the Doab, alleging that Zabita Khan corresponded with them and did not seriously oppose them. Najaf Khan considered seizing Zabita Khan's estates, establishing posts at Ghausgarh and Thana Bhawan, giving Najaf Quli Khan charge of the area, and assigning Zabita Khan a cash subsidy.

On 27 April, Murtaza Khan marched from Khekra to Bamnauli, while the Sikhs were encamped at Khatauli. He intended to attack them via Barnawa, but his troops also lacked money, and Najaf Khan promised to remit funds. On 29 April, Sahib Singh, Zabita Khan's representative, asked Najaf Khan to investigate the charges against Zabita Khan. Najaf Khan told him to advise Zabita Khan to join Najaf Quli Khan in driving the Sikhs from the Doab.

On 30 April, Sahib Singh stated that Zabita Khan would not fight under Najaf Quli Khan. Najaf Khan then told Najaf Quli to send Jalal Khan to Zabita Khan with a message that success against the Sikhs depended on Zabita Khan's assistance. Shafi also opposed Najaf Quli Khan's appointment in Saharanpur district, and his representative Dilaram complained that territory conquered by Shafi and Zain-ul-Abidin Khan had been assigned to Najaf Quli Khan.

Murtaza Khan camped at Kandhla and sought help from local chiefs against the Sikhs. Sixteen troopers of Bagha Rao, fearing the Sikhs, hid in Kakripur while going to join Murtaza Khan. The Sikhs invested the village, forced the inhabitants to surrender the Marathas, seized their horses, and left them wounded. Several Sikh parties with cattle and booty were reported crossing or preparing to cross the Jamuna.

Najaf Khan then instructed Sahib Singh to urge Zabita Khan to join Najaf Quli, settle terms with the Sikhs quickly, and arrange for 5,000 Sikhs to serve under Najaf Khan. Zabita Khan was made mediator in the affair. On the same day, Kajjar fought the Sikhs in Kairana parganah, losing two hawaldars and ten soldiers before artillery fire forced the Sikhs to withdraw. The Sikhs then besieged Garhi Abdullah Khan.

On 7 May, when Shafi moved against Buriya, a Sikh force under Rae Singh and Bhag Singh crossed into Saharanpur district. Najaf Khan again pressed Zabita Khan to cooperate with Najaf Quli Khan. On 3 June, Gopal Rao Maratha was appointed to restore order in the Meerut parganahs with 500 horse, five infantry battalions, and two cannon.

== Final phase of the campaign ==
On 1 May, Shafi fixed his camp at Damla, and on 2 May he moved to Drazpur. The Sikhs fought him during the march. He then reached the Jamuna at the Nakum-Tabar ghat and established his headquarters there. On 4 May, he received letters from officers at Sadhaura and Shahabad stating that rumours of Najaf Quli Khan's approach were spreading, zamindars were rebelling, and Sikhs were creating disturbances.

Petitions from the amils of Sadhaura and Shahabad described their difficulties. The amil of Shahabad stated that he had been defeated, expelled from the town, and forced to shelter in a serai outside it. On 7 May, Shafi learned that the Sikhs had besieged Buriya and marched there with a selected force. On hearing of his approach, the Sikhs crossed the Jamuna into Saharanpur district. Shafi sent two battalions of Shaikh Haidar to Shahabad after receiving another appeal from the amil there, and then returned to Nakum-Tabar.

=== Agreement with Gajpat Singh ===
Shafi received a written agreement from Gajpat Singh. Gajpat Singh agreed to pay one lakh of rupees when he reached Kunjpura and fifty thousand rupees at Karnal, to provide his son as security for two lakhs of rupees, and to remain in attendance on Shafi. The agreement provided that his country would be laid waste if he intrigued with the Sikhs against the Emperor. Shafi released him and gave him a six-piece khilat, a jewelled turban ornament, an elephant, and a horse. His Diwan Nigahi Singh and companions also received gifts.

On 9 May, Bhag Singh and Rae Singh returned from plundering Saharanpur district and began fighting the amil of Buriya. The Sikhs also continued pressure on Sadhaura, and Mir Mansur was asked to send selected horsemen to relieve both places. On 10 May, Khalil Beg reported from Shahabad that Baghel Singh, Bhag Singh, and Sher Singh were fighting him daily and that he had taken up a defensive position below the serai walls outside the town.

Shafi marched to Mahanpur and was attacked on the way. About fifteen men on each side were wounded, one Sikh follower of Baghel Singh was killed, and two Sikh horses were seized. On 12 May, Jai Singh Rae reported that Gajpat Singh could arrange payment of one lakh of rupees within twenty days.

=== Recapture of Shahabad by the Sikhs ===
The amil of Shahabad informed Shafi that the Sikhs had again besieged him and were firing from nearby rooftops. Shafi ordered Sher Din Khan and Bagha Rao to relieve him, but they refused because their troops were demanding arrears of pay, had gone without food for three days, and were deserting. Another report stated that fighting continued until 15 May. On 15 May, Shafi also learned that Tara Singh Kakar, Mohar Singh, Jai Singh, and Khushhal Singh Faizullahpuria had left Rupar for Patiala to confer with Amar Singh and had reached Sirhind.

On 16 May, Shafi received two hundis worth fifty thousand rupees and ten thousand rupees in cash from Gajpat Singh, and the cash was distributed to the troops. Najaf Khan, aware of disaffection in the camp, wrote to Shafi's officers that deserters would lose their estates and horses.

Khalil Beg sent an urgent request for help. Shafi asked his officers to relieve him, but none agreed because of discontent among the troops. Zain-ul-Abidin Khan also refused, arguing that the destruction of his troops would endanger the whole army. Najaf Khan nevertheless instructed Shafi to march to Shahabad and ordered Murtaza Khan to join him.

On 18 May, a messenger reported that Karam Singh and Baghel Singh were fighting the amil of Shahabad and had breached the wall of the serai. Sher Singh of Buria was besieging Sadhaura, Rae Singh and Bhag Singh were encamped at Amin, and Sikhs from Rupar remained at Sarhind. On 21 May, the amil of Shahabad reported that the Sikhs had advanced closer and controlled the town. Shafi prepared to march, but Mir Mansur dissuaded him from moving without a strong army.

On 22 May, Khalil Beg sought peace through Karam Singh and offered a horse as nazar. The Sikhs demanded that he evacuate the serai. When Khalil Beg came out with 300 horse, 800 foot, and two cannon, his troops were attacked and plundered, and Khalil Beg was shot dead. The fall of Shahabad disheartened Shafi and led him to appeal to Delhi for reinforcement.

=== Mughal Retreat from Punjab ===
On 28 May, Shafi sent Sayyid Ali, Gangaram, Ghulam Muhammad, and Sher Din Khan Mandal, each with a battalion, to assist the amil of Sadhaura. On 29 May, Shafi wrote to Najaf Khan that the soldiers were demanding salary and wanted to go to Delhi with Gajpat Singh.

The battalions marching to Sadhaura reached Damla and fought the Sikhs through the day on 30 May before reaching the vicinity of Sadhaura by nightfall. The imperial troops lost seven killed and 150 wounded; the Sikhs lost ten troopers and their horses. The commanders decided that if the Sikhs appeared in greater strength they would retire with the amil to Shafi's camp.

Early on 31 May, the Mughal commanders evacuated Sadhaura and withdrew the posts at Bilaspur and Mustafabad before rejoining Shafi. The Sikhs pursued them throughout the day. In the day's fighting the Sikhs lost eighty men, while the imperial forces lost forty killed and wounded. The Sikhs then moved toward Buriya to expel Shafi's officer.

=== Continued Retreat and the Battle of Sirhind, June 1781 ===
Shafi wanted to send Gajpat Singh to Delhi but hesitated because of the Sikhs. The same day 2,000 Sikhs appeared at Buria to invest it, but artillery fire from the fort drove them away. On 2 June, Shafi sent Gajpat Singh to Delhi with the battalions of Kajjar and Murad Beg. A body of 2,000 Sikhs marched toward Kunjpura, and another force of 5,000 besieged Damla and Ghulam Qadir Khan, being ill, left for Ghausgarh.

Rae Singh, Bhag Singh, and Baghel Singh camped at Damla with 3,000 soldiers, while other Sikhs halted about nine kilometres away. Five hundred Sikhs suddenly appeared before Shafi's camp at Nakum-Tabar and withdrew after wounding two or three soldiers. Frequent skirmishing took place on 4 June.

On 4 June, Gajpat Singh, Nigahi Singh, and Diwan Singh were presented to Najaf Khan by Mahdi Quli Khan in Delhi and received robes or shawls after offering nazar. On 8 June, Dilaram presented Shafi's petition to Najaf Khan, asking for immediate money because the troops were becoming rebellious.

On 9 June, Surjan Khan Mandal marched toward Damla and skirmished with the Sikhs, killing one Sikh, wounding three or four, and seizing two horses, while three or four of his own troopers were wounded. Zain-ul-Abidin Khan considered leaving the camp because no money had arrived from Delhi, but Mir Mansur persuaded him to remain.

Reports stated that the Sikhs intended to cross the Jamuna into the Doab. Shafi wished to pursue them, leave the west bank under Gajpat Singh, and camp during the rainy season in the Doab, but Najaf Khan ordered him not to cross the Jamuna. On 12 June, Shafi sent Jai Singh Rae to Diwan Singh, Baghel Singh, and Gurdit Singh to negotiate peace. Shafi offered Radaur, Babain, and Shamgarh in return for the booty of Shahabad, but the Sikhs rejected the offer.

On the same day, Ram Ratan Modi submitted a report to Najaf Khan on Gajpat Singh's revenues. The total revenue was six lakhs of rupees and two lakhs and forty thousand had already been paid to Shafi, two lakhs and ten thousand were promised within eight days, and the remaining one lakh and fifty thousand were to be paid in three instalments over two months. Hostages were to be given until full payment.

A Marathi letter dated 10 June 1781 claimed that Najaf Khan had sent Shafi with 40,000 troops and artillery, that the Sikhs defeated the imperial army, killed 10,000 to 15,000 soldiers, seized all its guns, and drove it back to Panipat.

On 16 June, Dalel Khan of Kunjpura advised Shafi to camp near Buriya for the rainy season because the Sikhs were attacking it daily. On 19 June, the Sikh chiefs offered peace terms, which Shafi rejected. On 22 June, Najaf Khan ordered Shafi to camp at Radaur for the rainy season, but Shafi remained for a time at the Nakum-Tabar ghat and later fell back to Kunjpura.

== Causes of the Mughal failure ==
Shafi's campaign failed despite disunion among the Sikh chiefs. The chief reason given by Hari Ram Gupta and Jadunath Sarkar is Najaf Khan's bankruptcy, which prevented him from supplying Shafi with reinforcements, money, or even sufficient ammunition. Najaf Khan's financial weakness also affected the Emperor and the imperial harem, whose allowances were unpaid.

Many Mughal commanders were paid by revenue assignments in the upper Doab, but Sikh raids prevented revenue collection there. As a result, the commanders were unable to maintain their troops, and Shafi's camp became increasingly unstable. Najaf Khan needed Zabita Khan's cooperation because Zabita Khan had large estates and influence in the region, but Shafi and Zabita Khan were unable to cooperate. This can be attributed to personal, ethnic, religious, and political factors. Shafi was an Iranian Shia, while Zabita Khan was a Rohilla Afghan Sunni. Zabita Khan demanded money to support his troops and was reluctant to attack Sikh allies who could be useful to him in the future.

Shafi remained at Kunjpura until mid-summer 1782, even after Najaf Khan's death on 6 April 1782. The Emperor sent him a robe of honour on 14 April 1782, and Najaf Khan's sister called him to Delhi on 12 June 1782.

== Settlement and recognition of rakhi ==
By the end of May 1781, Najaf Khan had moved toward a negotiated settlement through Zabita Khan because Shafi had failed as an agent for dealing with the Sikhs. On 27 June 1781, Zabita Khan was permitted to settle terms with the Sikhs and went to Ghausgarh. On 12 July, Najaf Khan fixed Gajpat Singh's tribute at six lakhs of rupees, received three lakhs, and kept Gajpat Singh's son as hostage for the balance.

Gajpat Singh received robes of honour, a jewelled ornament for the turban, a sword, a pearl necklace, a frilled palanquin, a horse, and an elephant, and was granted the title of Maharaja. His son, Diwan, and companions also received khilats. The Marathi records cited by Gupta place the grant of the title on 7 July 1781.

Hari Ram Gupta characterizes the settlement as formal Mughal acceptance of Sikh possession west of the Yamuna and recognition of Sikh rakhi rights in the upper Ganga Doab.

== Bibliography ==
- Gandhi, Surjit Singh (1999). Sikhs in the Eighteenth Century: Their Struggle for Survival and Supremacy. Singh Bros. ISBN 9788172052171.
- Gupta, Hari Ram (1939). History of the Sikhs: Trans-Sutlej Sikhs, 1769–1799. History of the Sikhs. Vol. 3. S. N. Sarkar.
- Gupta, Hari Ram (1978). History of the Sikhs: The Sikh Commonwealth or Rise and Fall of Sikh Misls. History of the Sikhs. Vol. 4 (3rd, illustrated ed.). New Delhi: Munshiram Manoharlal Publishers. ISBN 9788121501651.
- Gupta, Hari Ram (1999). History of the Sikhs: Sikh Domination of the Mughal Empire, 1764–1803. History of the Sikhs. Vol. 3 (2nd, illustrated ed.). Munshiram Manoharlal Publishers. ISBN 8121502136.
- Sarkar, Jadunath (1972). Fall of the Mughal Empire: 1771–88. Fall of the Mughal Empire. Vol. 3 (2nd reprint ed.). AMS Press. ISBN 040405580X.
- Dilagīra, Harajindara Siṅgha; Sekhon, Awatar Singh (2017). The Sikhs' Struggle for Sovereignty: An Historical Perspective. Sikh Educational Trust. ISBN 9780986803741.
- Rao, Vasant D., ed. (1968). Studies in Indian History: Dr. A. G. Pawar Felicitation Volume. Appasaheb Ganapatrao Pawar. Y. P. Pawar.
