= Battle of Jind (1776) =

- Part of Mughal–Sikh conflicts
Date	May 1776
Location	Jind
Result	Sikh victory
Territorial changes	Gohana annexed to Jind; Hissar, Hansi and Rohtak occupied by Amar Singh of Patiala

Belligerents
Mughal Empire	Jind State; Patiala State; Nabha State; Kaithal State

Commanders and leaders
Rahimdad Khan Rohilla †	Gajpat Singh of Jind; Amar Singh of Patiala; Hamir Singh of Nabha; Desu Singh of Kaithal

Strength
10,000 men Strong force with artillery	5,000 men

Casualties and losses
5,000-7,000 killed	Minimal

The Battle of Jind was a conflict in May 1776 between the forces of Mulla Rahimdad Khan Rohilla and Sikh forces led by Raja Gajpat Singh of Jind. The battle followed Rahimdad Khan's appointment by Abdul Ahad Khan as deputy for the Panipat and Karnal districts and his movement against the territories of Gajpat Singh. Gajpat Singh obtained assistance from Patiala, Nabha and Kaithal, and the Sikh force attacked Rahimdad Khan's camp after midnight.

Rahimdad Khan was killed during the fighting, after which his troops lost cohesion and much of their baggage and plunder fell into Sikh hands. Gajpat Singh, with the Patiala detachment, later annexed Gohana to Jind, while Hissar, Hansi and Rohtak were occupied by Amar Singh of Patiala.

== Background ==
Mulla Rahimdad Khan Rohilla had served Najib-ud-Daulah and then remained for a period with Zabita Khan. He later joined Mirza Najaf Khan with 4,000 horse and foot and served in the campaigns of Kotban, Agra and Dig. After failing to obtain a reward he considered suitable, he entered the service of Ranjit Singh of Bharatpur, but was dismissed after intriguing against the Jat ruler.

Rahimdad Khan then came to Delhi and gained the support of Abdul Ahad Khan. Abdul Ahad appointed him governor of Panipat and supplied him with a strong force and artillery. Abdul Ahad Khan sent Rahimdad Rohilla in 1776 to recover Hansi and Hissar from the Khalsa, because the Phulkian Misl had conquered territories formerly under the emperor of Delhi. Another reason for Abdul Ahad's hostility toward the Sikhs was their protection of Zabita Khan and their involvement in the killing of Abdul Qasim.

== Rahimdad Khan's advance ==
After leaving Delhi, Rahimdad Khan, leading 10,000 men, attacked Muhammad Bashir Khan Habshi, the faujdar of Lalpur and Rohtak. Bashir abandoned his treasury and property and fled to Mirza Najaf Khan at Deeg. Rahimdad Khan then captured Hansi and Hissar.

The territory between Rahimdad Khan's newly conquered area and Panipat included the principality of Jind, ruled by Raja Gajpat Singh. Rahimdad Khan attacked Gajpat Singh with the aim of joining his holdings into one continuous block. He laid siege to Jind, demanded the surrender of the garrison and a large sum of money, and his troops devastated Gajpat Singh's territory while carrying off plunder.

=== Phulkian relief force ===
Gajpat Singh requested assistance from his relatives and allies at Patiala, Nabha and Kaithal. Raja Amar Singh of Patiala sent Diwan Nanumal with a strong contingent. Raja Hamir Singh of Nabha, the Bhais of Kaithal and several neighbouring Sikh chiefs also joined the relief force numbering 5,000 men.

== Battle ==
The Sikh force reached Jind after midnight and launched a sudden attack on Rahimdad Khan's camp. Rahimdad Khan's men were not expecting an enemy nearby, and many fled with their booty when the Sikh attack began. Rahimdad Khan remained with the troops who did not flee and engaged the Sikhs. During the fighting, the Sikhs initially gave way, and Rahimdad Khan advanced in pursuit. He was then struck by three shots in the head and body and died immediately.

Rahimdad Khan's death caused disorder among his troops. Many of his remaining men were killed, and the baggage and much of the booty fell into Sikh hands. Men who fled were also stripped of their possessions by local people.

Antoine Polier, characterized Rahimdad Khan as a brave chief and a strict Muslim partisan. Lepel Griffin, recorded that trophies from the victory were still preserved at Jind and that Rahimdad Khan's tomb stood within the principal gate.

== Aftermath ==
The victory ended Rahimdad Khan's attack on Gajpat Singh's territory. Gajpat Singh, accompanied by the Patiala detachment, conquered Gohana and annexed it to Jind. While Hissar, Hansi and Rohtak were occupied by Amar Singh of Patiala.

== Bibliography ==
- Gandhi, Surjit Singh (1999). Sikhs in the Eighteenth Century: Their Struggle for Survival and Supremacy. Singh Bros. ISBN 9788172052171.
- Gupta, Hari Ram (1978). History of the Sikhs: The Sikh Commonwealth or Rise and Fall of Sikh Misls. History of the Sikhs. Vol. 4 (3rd, illustrated ed.). Munshiram Manoharlal Publishers. ISBN 9788121501651.
- Gupta, Hari Ram (1999). History of the Sikhs: Sikh Domination of the Mughal Empire, 1764–1803. History of the Sikhs. Vol. 3 (2nd, illustrated ed.). Munshiram Manoharlal Publishers. ISBN 8121502136.
- Singh, Ganda (1990). Sardar Jassa Singh Ahluwalia. Publication Bureau, Punjabi University.
- Dilagīra, Harajindara Siṅgha (2010). Sikh History – 3: War and Peace, 1716–1860. Amritsar: Sikh University Press. ISBN 9782930247434.
