= Abdul Ahad's Patiala campaign =

- Part of Mughal–Sikh conflicts
Date	18th June– 18th October 1779
Location	Cis-Satluj region
Result	Patiala–Sikh victory

Belligerents
Mughal Empire; Sikh auxiliaries	Patiala State; Trans-Satluj Sikhs

Commanders and leaders
Mughal Commanders: Abdul Ahad Khan Majd-ud-Daulah; Prince Mirza Jahan Shah Farkhunda Bakht; Sayyid Ali Khan; Taj Muhammad Khan; Ghazi Khan; Alam Khan; Hurmat Khan; Qutbuddin Khan; Sikh auxiliaries: Gajpat Singh of Jind; Baghel Singh; Bhag Singh of Thanesar; Sahib Singh Khondah; Diwan Singh; Karam Singh Nirmala; Sada Singh; Mohar Singh; Rae Singh of Buriya; Bhanga Singh	Cis-Sutlej Sikhs: Amar Singh of Patiala; Maha Singh; Diwan Nanumal; Tara Singh Ghaiba; Trans-Sutlej Sikhs: Jassa Singh Ahluwalia; Jai Singh Kanhaiya; Haqiqat Singh Kanhaiya; Tirlok Singh; Amar Singh Bagha; Amar Singh Kingra; Tara Singh Kakar; Mohar Singh Nishanwala; Anup Singh; Khushal Singh Singhpuria

Strength
20,000-50,000 horse and foot 200 cannons Sikh mercenaries	15,000 horsemen Later Sikh reinforcements rumoured at two lakhs

Casualties and losses
est.:10,000-20,000 killed 10,000 killed during retreat	~3,000 Sikhs killed

Abdul Ahad's Patiala campaign was a Mughal expedition led by Abdul Ahad Khan Majd-ud-Daulah with Prince Mirza Jahan Shah Farkhunda Bakht against the Cis-Satluj Sikh chiefs and the Patiala State in 1779. The expedition began from Delhi on 18 June 1779 and ended with Abdul Ahad's retreat from Patiala beginning on 14 October and his return to Delhi on 5 November.

The campaign developed from Abdul Ahad's rivalry with Mirza Najaf Khan and his attempt to use Sikh support to strengthen his own position in the name of the Mughal emperor Shah Alam II. Raja Amar Singh of Patiala had sought imperial assistance against rival Sikh chiefs, but Abdul Ahad also relied on those same rival chiefs after reaching the Karnal region. This divided policy, combined with demands for tribute, the arrest of Sikh chiefs, unpaid troops, desertion among Sikh auxiliaries, and the arrival of Sikh forces supporting Patiala, led to the failure of the expedition.

After the retreat, the Mughal court panicked over the safety of Prince Farkhunda Bakht and recalled Mirza Najaf Khan to Delhi. Abdul Ahad briefly recovered influence with Shah Alam, but Najaf Khan entered Delhi, occupied the fort through his lieutenant Afrasiyab Khan, and secured Abdul Ahad's submission on 15 November 1779. The affair ended the divided control of the Mughal government and restored unified authority under Mirza Najaf Khan.

== Background ==
Abdul Ahad Khan Majd-ud-Daulah held the regency of the Mughal Empire but was militarily weaker than Mirza Najaf Khan. He sought an outside military partner against Najaf Khan after Zabita Khan declined to undertake such an enterprise, the Jat and Macheri powers had been checked by Najaf Khan, and the Marathas were occupied in conflict with the British and internal disputes. The Sikhs were therefore treated as a possible ally in Abdul Ahad's rivalry with Najaf Khan.

In September 1778, Abdul Ahad sent Bahram Quli Khan to welcome Sahib Singh Khondah and other Sikh sardars who had encamped near the Shalimar gardens north-west of Delhi. He then persuaded the emperor to grant the title of Najib-ud-Daulah II to Mallu Khan, a younger son of Najib-ud-Daulah and a Sikh protégé, as a counterweight to Zabita Khan, who had become aligned with Mirza Najaf Khan. Abdul Ahad later visited the Sikh sardars in Yaqub Ali Khan's garden and gave them robes of honour in the emperor's name.

After Shah Alam II returned from Jaipur in April 1779, Abdul Ahad turned his attention to the region north of Delhi. He had already arranged the appointment of his son-in-law Sayyid Ali Khan as faujdar of the Sonepat-Panipat district, but the area contained Sikh strongholds and some places held by Najaf Khan's collectors. Abdul Ahad then summoned Sikh sardars of the Karnal region to discuss a pact, but the emperor refused to receive them because such an audience would conflict with Najaf Khan's policy.

Raja Amar Singh of Patiala sent an envoy with presents to Abdul Ahad seeking imperial support. Amar Singh was in conflict with other Cis-Satluj Sikh chiefs, especially Baghel Singh. Sikh leaders present in Delhi, including envoys connected with Bhai Desu Singh of Kaithal, encouraged Abdul Ahad to enter the Cis-Satluj region and promised support, while also holding out the possibility of recovering Lahore and Multan for the empire.

== March from Delhi ==
Abdul Ahad asked Shah Alam II to accompany the expedition, but the emperor declined because of the summer heat and recent illness. The eldest prince, Mirza Jahandar Shah, avoided participation by pleading illness, and the second prince, Mirza Jahan Shah Farkhunda Bakht, was sent with Abdul Ahad.

According to Hari Ram Gupta and G.S. Cheema the expedition left Delhi on 18 June 1779 in, while Jadunath Sarkar places the departure on 3 June. The force marched along the western bank of the Yamuna, with halts including Barari Ghat, Bakhtawarpur in parganah Haveli, Barota in parganah Sonepat, and a position near Panipat by 29 July. Abdul Ahad also displaced Mirza Najaf Khan's collectors along the route and installed his own agents and resistance to these changes was met by attacks and devastation of lands.

Estimates of Abdul Ahad's force strength vary considerably across sources. One account puts his army at 50,000 horse and foot supported by 200 pieces of cannon, while William Francklin places the figure at just 20,000 men with artillery. Warren Hastings offers an intermediate estimate of 30,000, and Jonathan Scott provides the most detailed breakdown: six European-style sepoy battalions, an artillery contingent, 6,000 cavalry, 8,000 irregular infantry, and bands of mercenary Sikhs.

=== Camp at Karnal ===
At Karnal, Sikh chiefs including Sahib Singh Khondah, Diwan Singh, Baghel Singh and Karam Singh Nirmala waited on Abdul Ahad. Gajpat Singh, the zamindar of Karnal, also paid homage to the prince. Baghel Singh, who had longstanding hostility toward Gajpat Singh, advised Abdul Ahad to imprison him to extract tribute. Gajpat Singh was confined and obtained his release by promising two lakhs of rupees.

Tahmas Khan Miskin, who was present in the campaign, says that Gajpat Singh became Abdul Ahad's chief adviser in Karnal affairs. Abdul Ahad enlisted Sikhs who sought service, gave marks of honour to Sikh chiefs who interviewed him, and placed Sikh posts in villages whose inhabitants had fled from the royal troops.

Abdul Ahad remained at Karnal during the rainy season. Between Karnal and Patiala lay the Sarasvati, Markanda, and Ghaggar streams, which are described in the supplied text as fordable. During this period, numerous Sikh chiefs hostile to Amar Singh joined Abdul Ahad and urged him to act against Patiala, although Amar Singh had been the ruler who had originally sought imperial aid.

=== Arrest of Desu Singh of Kaithal ===
Abdul Ahad broke camp at Karnal on 9 September after the rainy season. He sent Gajpat Singh, Baghel Singh, and Sada Singh to bring Desu Singh of Kaithal, who had been under pressure from Amar Singh, to the imperial camp. Desu Singh was presented near Thanesar and offered five gold coins, two bows, five cotton bedsheets, and two horses as nazar. He received a five-piece khilat, a sarpech, and a sword, while his companions received shawls.

Abdul Ahad first demanded three lakhs of rupees from Desu Singh. When Desu Singh agreed to two lakhs, Abdul Ahad raised the demand to five lakhs.Gajpat Singh then advised Abdul Ahad to arrest the Sikh sardars in camp as a device to extract payment from Desu Singh. Abdul Ahad summoned Diwan Nanumal, Maha Singh, Ram Dayal, Desu Singh, and Gajpat Singh to his tent and detained them. All except Desu Singh were released after offering to pay arrears, while Desu Singh and eight companions remained confined.

During the discussion of tribute on 14 September, Abdul Ahad threatened to establish direct imperial administration over Desu Singh's territory and demanded the return of property taken from Abul Qasim Khan after his defeat and death in the Doab in March 1776. Desu Singh's Diwan eventually offered five lakhs as tribute and one and a half lakhs for expenses, payable within a month, on condition that Desu Singh's estates be confirmed by imperial rescript and protected from Amar Singh's encroachments. A tribute of four lakhs was later settled, three lakhs were collected immediately, and Desu Singh's son Lal Singh was taken as hostage for the balance.

=== Negotiations with Patiala ===
Rae Singh of Buria, Bhanga Singh, and Bhag Singh joined the Mughal camp at Thanesar on 12 September. Bhag Singh and Bhanga Singh wrote to Sikh chiefs of Shahabad and Ambala asking them to join the prince's camp, but those chiefs refused. On 14 September, Mohar Singh and other sardars came with 400 horse, offered gifts, and received robes and honours. Karam Singh arrived the next morning and also received honours.

Raja Shambu Nath and Raja Daya Ram had been sent to Patiala to bring Nanumal, the Diwan of Amar Singh, to the camp. Nanumal and Maha Singh, Amar Singh's brother-in-law, were received by the prince and Abdul Ahad. Nanumal offered bankers' bills worth five lakhs of rupees and an additional Rs. 25,000 as nazarana for the prince on the condition that Abdul Ahad immediately withdraw. Abdul Ahad refused to accept the payment on those terms and insisted that Amar Singh appear in person.

Amar Singh had refrained from entering the imperial camp after seeing Abdul Ahad's treatment of Gajpat Singh and Desu Singh. He invited assistance from the Trans-Satluj Sikhs, and Abdul Ahad received news on 15 September that Tara Singh Ghaiba, Karam Singh, and other chiefs were encamped near Patiala. On 17 September, Abdul Ahad moved to Seoli, where Gajpat Singh explained that Amar Singh hesitated to appear because Abdul Ahad had become friendly with Desu Singh and other Sikh chiefs whom Amar Singh had asked him to punish. Nanumal also stated that Amar Singh would not come into camp and urged Abdul Ahad to accept tribute and retire.

On 19 September, news reached the camp that Amar Singh had left Patiala, leaving its defence to his wife, who had advised him to pay tribute and avoid opposing the prince. Gajpat Singh stood security for Amar Singh's dues and pressed Abdul Ahad to withdraw, but Abdul Ahad refused. On 20 September, Abdul Ahad told Gajpat Singh that he would march to Patiala unless Amar Singh came into camp, and he refused to accept money or terms from anyone except the Raja himself.

Nanumal raised the proposed Patiala tribute to seven lakhs and asked Abdul Ahad to retire, but Abdul Ahad still insisted that Amar Singh appear personally at least once. He assured Bhanga Singh, Baghel Singh, and other Sikh chiefs that a quarter of Amar Singh's tribute would be paid to them, as in the case of Desu Singh's tribute.

== March on Patiala ==
Abdul Ahad moved toward Patiala on 22 September and crossed the Sarasvati near Pehowa on 23 September. His vanguard, mainly Sikh auxiliaries and some Mughal horsemen, raided Patiala territory and drove away cattle. Nanumal made another attempt to secure a settlement by presenting bankers' bills for five lakhs, but Abdul Ahad demanded thirty lakhs and tore up the bills. Some Mughal and Sikh troops laid waste five villages of Amar Singh's territory and besieged Saifabad and a fire in the fort's powder magazine burned or wounded 300 members of the garrison.

On 26 September, Baghel Singh and Karam Singh discussed Amar Singh's tribute with Abdul Ahad, but no settlement was reached. Desu Singh was also released that day after being given honours, while his son Lal Singh remained in the imperial camp as hostage. On 28 September, Abdul Ahad reached Ghuram, south of Patiala, which became the Mughal base. Negotiators reported that Amar Singh was willing to meet Abdul Ahad if his safety was guaranteed by an oath on the Quran. Abdul Ahad gave such assurances and temporarily forbade raids into Amar Singh's territory while tribute negotiations continued.

On 29 September, Baghel Singh, Achal Singh, Sada Singh, Gurdit Singh, Dulaha Singh, and others waited on Abdul Ahad. When ordered to go to Patiala and bring Amar Singh, they demanded full payment of their arrears and settlement of pay for their new levies before obeying. Abdul Ahad promised payment after Amar Singh arrived. A Sikh force sent toward Patiala was repulsed by Amar Singh's troops and retreated to the Mughal camp.

On 30 September, Amar Singh informed Abdul Ahad that he would send a trusted person to settle terms. A letter from Gajpat Singh then stated that he had persuaded Amar Singh to attend an audience on 3 October. Abdul Ahad ordered troops not to quarrel with Amar Singh's men and arranged for Sayyid Ali Khan, Taj Muhammad Khan, and Raja Daya Ram to receive him. On 4 October, arrangements were again made for Amar Singh's interview, and a robe of honour was prepared for him.

On 5 October, letters from Sayyid Ali Khan, Raja Daya Ram, and Shambu Nath stated that they had persuaded Baghel Singh, Karam Singh, Sada Singh, and other Sikh chiefs to accompany them toward Patiala. Amar Singh received them with food and postponed the meeting by stating that it was the day of his father's shradh. On 7 October, Amar Singh met Taj Muhammad Khan and then went to Sayyid Ali Khan's camp, where Shambu Nath, Gajpat Singh, and others were present. He proposed to meet the prince and Abdul Ahad the next day in the company of Rae Kalha, but he later returned after going part of the way, still suspecting how he would be treated in the Mughal camp.

War followed the failed negotiations. On the morning of 7 October, Abdul Ahad sent a strong detachment against Patiala. A battle was fought between Amar Singh and Tara Singh Ghaiba's combined troops and the Mughal force. The Mughals were victorious in the field, and Amar Singh and Tara Singh Ghaiba withdrew into the fort. The imperial army encamped outside Patiala and laid siege to the town on 8 October.

== Disaster and Great Mughal Retreat ==
Fighting continued on 8 and 9 October, but Abdul Ahad failed to make an impression on the fort. Prince Farkhunda Bakht urged an assault, but Abdul Ahad did not attempt one. The delay damaged the Mughal position and troops became restless over arrears of pay, tensions developed between Mughal and Afghan elements, Ghazi Khan and Alam Khan refused to fight because their soldiers had not been paid, Hurmat Khan revolted, and many Sikh auxiliaries deserted after Tara Singh Ghaiba joined Amar Singh.

Amar Singh had also called the Majha Sikhs under Jassa Singh Ahluwalia. Jassa Singh, then at Batala, summoned Sikh sardars, and Jai Singh Kanhaiya, Haqiqat Singh Kanhaiya, Tirlok Singh, Amar Singh Bagha, Amar Singh Kingra, and other Kanhaiya chiefs gathered at Achal. After further movements through Sathiala, they crossed the Satluj at Talwan-ka-patan, where they were joined by Sada Singh, Tara Singh Kakar, Mohar Singh Nishanwala, and Anup Singh. Reports of this army were enlarged by rumour to two lakhs.

Abdul Ahad consulted Baghel Singh, who warned him of the force under Jassa Singh Ahluwalia near Malerkotla. Abdul Ahad decided to retreat and told Baghel Singh that the emperor had called him back to Delhi. Baghel Singh advised Abdul Ahad to bribe the Majha Sikh chiefs before his withdrawal and Abdul Ahad gave him three lakhs of rupees collected from Desu Singh, of which Baghel Singh paid Rs. 10,000 to Jassa Singh Ahluwalia, Rs. 5,000 to Tara Singh Ghaiba, and Rs. 7,000 to Jai Singh Kanhaiya, retaining the remainder.

William Francklin describes, that Sikh attacks threw the king's troops into confusion and that the retreat lasted four days before the army reached Panipat on 18 October, where the Sikhs ceased pursuit. Jadunath Sarkar states that Prince Farkhunda Bakht's presence helped prevent the destruction of the Mughal army because the Sikhs did not press their attack to the extreme against the emperor's son. Abdul Ahad's only stated gain from the expedition was that he brought back Lal Singh, Desu Singh's son, who remained a hostage. The army returned to Delhi on 5 November.

== Political consequences at Delhi ==
The retreat created a crisis at the Mughal court. When couriers reported on 16 October that Prince Farkhunda Bakht had begun the retreat from Patiala, the court feared for the prince and for Delhi's security. Shah Alam II sent urgent orders recalling Mirza Najaf Khan, who was then campaigning in the south with a large army. Najaf Khan gathered his detachments and marched toward Delhi.

Abdul Ahad returned to Delhi in early November in a weakened position, but he persuaded Shah Alam that Najaf Khan's return would make him dangerously powerful. The emperor then wrote to Najaf Khan countermanding the earlier order to come to Delhi. Najaf Khan received the second order only two marches from the capital and ignored it, reaching the Kishandas Tank in the southern suburbs on 12 November.

On 14 November, Abdul Ahad went with Prince Akbar Shah to Najaf Khan's camp to escort him to the emperor. Before Najaf Khan entered the fort, Afrasiyab Khan entered with 1,000 horse and two battalions of sepoys. Abdul Ahad's troops under Qutbuddin Khan had orders not to fight, and the imperial guard eventually yielded after receiving assurances about arrears of pay. By the time Najaf Khan arrived at court, parts of the fort were already under his control.

After the audience, Abdul Ahad and Najaf Khan left the hall together. Afrasiyab Khan and Maniram had urged Najaf to arrest Abdul Ahad, but Najaf did not wish to seize him inside the emperor's presence. Latafat Ali Khan intervened physically between the two men, preventing an immediate seizure. Najaf Khan then left Afrasiyab and his men inside the fort and withdrew to Raushan-ud-Daulah's mosque.

Abdul Ahad spent the afternoon and night at the gate of the Diwan-i-am, watched by Najaf Khan's men and protected by his own remaining supporters and the emperor's servants. Shah Alam initially refused to surrender him and protested against the restraint placed on his minister. The city was unsettled through the night, and the emperor's family remained anxious for Abdul Ahad's safety. As Abdul Ahad's position weakened, his followers began to desert to Najaf Khan. When Latafat Ali and Mir Sayyid Ali also defected, Abdul Ahad submitted to Najaf Khan.

Najaf Khan swore to protect Abdul Ahad's life and property, stating that his object was to remove him from the emperor's presence. Abdul Ahad took leave of Shah Alam and was escorted by Afrasiyab to Najaf Khan's camp on 15 November, where he was lodged in a separate tent.

== Aftermath ==
On 16 November, Mirza Najaf Khan was again received by Shah Alam II. He presented a large nazar in cash along with jewels, robes, and horses, and the emperor appointed him Vakil-i-Mutlaq, the highest post in the Mughal Empire. Other offices previously held by Abdul Ahad, including command of the artillery, the second paymastership, and the diwani of the crown lands, were given to the princes, with Najaf Khan acting as their deputy. The result was the end of dual control in the imperial government and the restoration of unified authority under Najaf Khan.

== Bibliography ==
- Cheema, G. S. (2002). The Forgotten Mughals: A History of the Later Emperors of the House of Babar, 1707–1857. Manohar Publishers & Distributors. ISBN 8173044163.
- Gupta, Hari Ram (1939). History of the Sikhs: Cis-Sutlej Sikhs, 1769–1799. History of the Sikhs. Vol. 3. S. N. Sarkar.
- Gupta, Hari Ram (1999). History of the Sikhs: Sikh Domination of the Mughal Empire, 1764–1803. History of the Sikhs. Vol. 3 (2nd, illustrated ed.). Munshiram Manoharlal Publishers. ISBN 8121502136.
- Dilagīra, Harajindara Siṅgha (2010). Sikh History – 3: War and Peace, 1716–1860. Amritsar: Sikh University Press. ISBN 9782930247434.
- Sarkar, Jadunath (1972). Fall of the Mughal Empire: 1771–88. Fall of the Mughal Empire. Vol. 3 (2nd reprint ed.). AMS Press. ISBN 040405580X.
