= Gajpat Singh of Jind =

Gajpat Singh
- Raja; Maharaja
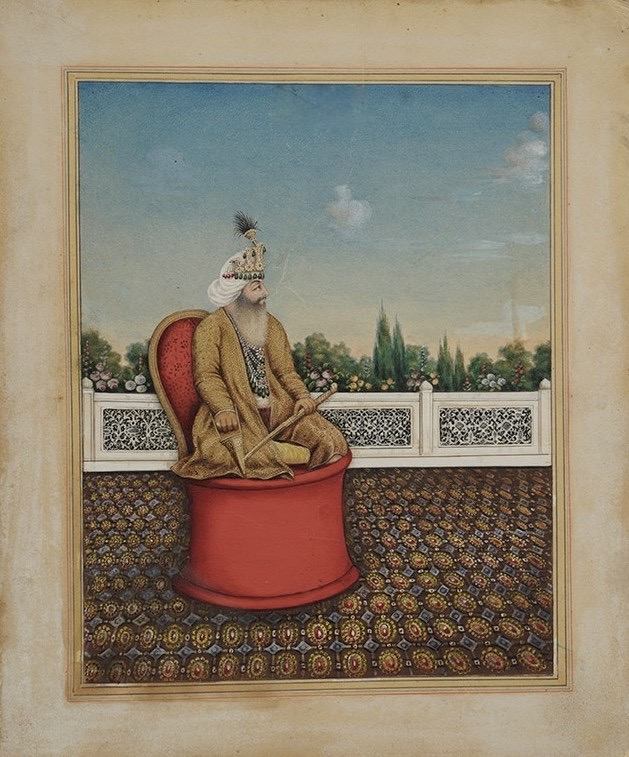
- Miniature painting of Raja Gajpat Singh

Founder-ruler of Jind State
- Recognized: 1772 – 18 January 1786 or 11 November 1789
- Recognition: Royal decree of Shah Alam II, 1772
- Predecessor: Position established
- Born: 15 April 1738
- Died: 18 January 1786 or 11 November 1789; Safidon
- Cause of death: Fever
- Wives: Daughter of Kishan Singh Mansahia; Widow of Alam Singh
- Children: Mehar Singh; Bhag Singh; Bhup Singh; Raj Kaur; Begama
- House: Jind
- Dynasty: Phulkian Dynasty
- Father: Sukhchain Singh
- Religion: Sikhism
- Occupation: Ruler, military leader
- Military career
- Allegiance: Dal Khalsa and Mughal Empire
- Conflicts: Battle of Sirhind (1764); Conflict with Samru; Conflict with Nabha; Battle of Jind (1776); Operations near Delhi and in the Ganga Doab; Abdul Ahad's Patiala campaign Mirza Shafi's campaign against Sikhs

Gajpat Singh (15 April 1738 – 11 November 1789) was the founder of the Sikh state of Jind and one of the prominent misl chiefs of eighteenth-century Punjab. The second son of Sukhchain Singh, he carved out a substantial principality centred on Jind and Safidon during a period of rapid Sikh expansion into territories formerly controlled by the Mughal Empire. He received the title of Raja under a royal farman from Shah Alam II in 1772, and was subsequently elevated to the rank of Maharaja by the imperial court in 1781. His daughter Raj Kaur became the mother of Maharaja Ranjit Singh, giving Gajpat Singh a significant place in the genealogy of the Sikh Empire. He participated in not fewer than thirty engagements over the course of his career.

== Early life and background ==
Gajpat Singh was born on 15 April 1738, the second son of Sukhchain Singh (d. 1751), who was the younger brother of Gurdit Singh, an ancestor of the ruling family of Nabha. He spent his early years at Phul, assisting his father against his rival and brother, Gurdit Singh. In his youth he was regarded as a fine, handsome, and intelligent person, well skilled in military crafts and exercises, and possessed of a quick grasp of affairs.

At the age of seventeen, in 1755, Gajpat Singh seized a large tract of country that included Jind and Safidon, which had been a Mughal pargana (revenue district). The town of Badrukhan was already in the family's possession at the time of his rise.

=== Participation in the Dal Khalsa ===
In January 1764, Gajpat Singh was present in the Dal Khalsa alongside Ala Singh of Patiala and Hamir Singh of Nabha during the conquest of the Sirhind province. He subsequently seized a large territory including the towns of Karnal, Panipat, Kasuhan, Kharkhaudah, and Sakrodah districts that formed part of the Mughal crownlands, the revenues of which funded the Mughal Emperor and the royal household. With Shah Alam II residing at Allahabad and the capital region under the control of Najib-ud-daulah Rohilla, Gajpat Singh negotiated with Najib and undertook to remit revenues from the captured parganas regularly, adopting the designation of malguzar (revenue payer). In 1766, he made Jind his capital.

== Imprisonment at Delhi ==
Gajpat Singh failed to remit revenues for three successive years, 1764–1767, the arrears amounting to one and a half lakh rupees. He was summoned to Delhi in 1767 by Najib-ud-daulah and held there for three years. During this period he impressed the Mughal court as a person of address and good demeanour and the Emperor expressed a desire for him to learn Persian and adopt Mughal courtly dress, a circumstance that led some contemporaries to attribute conversion to Islam to him.

Gajpat Singh secured his release in 1771 by promising to collect and pay the outstanding revenues and by leaving his son Mehar Singh as a hostage. He subsequently paid three lakh rupees, secured his son's liberty, and obtained both the title of Raja and the privilege of issuing his own coinage. The Mughal farman to this effect, bearing the seal of Emperor Shah Alam II, is dated 25 Shawal 1185 AH (31 January 1772). The title was confirmed in his territories. Jassa Singh Ahluwalia administered pahul to him a second time and ate with him publicly from the same dishes as a token of his reconversion to Sikhism.

== Coinage ==
Gajpat Singh coined his own money on the model of the coins of Patiala, with the sole distinction of Jind inscribed on them. These coins were referred to as Jindia rupees.

== Territorial expansion ==
=== Conflict with Nabha and acquisition of Sangrur, 1774 ===
In 1774, a serious incident arose when Gajpat Singh's daughter Raj Kaur was married to Mahan Singh Sukerchakia of Gujranwala. The horses and camels of the marriage party were let loose to graze in the Bir pasture ground belonging to Nabha State, whereupon Yaqub Khan, an officer of Hamir Singh of Nabha, attacked the party. Gajpat Singh subsequently feigned illness and lured Hamir Singh and Yaqub Khan to his residence. Yaqub Khan was killed, Hamir Singh was imprisoned, and a Jind army was dispatched to seize Nabha territories. Amloh and Bhadson were occupied, and Sangrur was besieged by Gajpat Singh in person. Sangrur was defended by Hamir Singh's wife Rani Deso for four months before surrendering through starvation. On the intercession of Raja Amar Singh of Patiala, Hamir Singh was freed and Amloh and Bhadson were restored and Sangrur, however, was retained by Gajpat Singh and was subsequently made the capital of the Jind state. For the protection of Jind town he built a fort there in 1775.

=== Further conquests and construction ===
In 1775, Gajpat Singh overran Hansi, Hisar, Rohtak, and Gohana, and also imposed contribution on Panipat and Karnal. His most important possessions came to include Jind, Sangrur, Safidon, and Kharkhoda. He extended his capital, Jind, considerably and constructed a fort in the north of the town and a strong brick fort with walls of uncommon height was also built at Safidon.

== Military engagements ==
=== Defence against Samru, 1773–1774 ===
In June 1773, Abdul Ahad Khan, a minister of Delhi, obtained the faujdari (military governorship) of Sarhind province and appointed Samru, a European adventurer, as his deputy, authorising him specifically to seize territory from Gajpat Singh of Jind. Samru assumed his duties in July 1773 at the head of nearly 2,000 soldiers, including Europeans, with five pieces of cannon and six elephants, and established headquarters at Gharaunda, between Panipat and Karnal. The Sikh forces gave Samru no rest, harassing his camp continuously; he was defeated in open engagement and maintained a precarious position until he resigned in September 1774. All Sikhs in the neighbourhood of Jind united against Samru's European-trained battalions, of whom three hundred were reported slain.

=== Defeat of Rahimdad Khan, May 1776 ===
In April 1776, Abdul Ahad Khan appointed Mulla Rahimdad Khan Rohilla with a strong force and artillery to besiege Jind and extract a large sum of money. Gajpat Singh sought assistance from Patiala, Nabha, and Kaithal. Allied Sikh forces, including a contingent from Patiala under Diwan Nanun Mai and the forces of Hamir Singh of Nabha, reached Jind after midnight and delivered an immediate assault. Rahimdad Khan was struck by three projectiles and was killed.

=== Raids on the Mughal Empire, 1776-1778 ===
In October–November 1776, a combined Sikh force of approximately 60,000 men under Amar Singh of Patiala and Gajpat Singh marched to Gohana, some 70 km north-west of Delhi, and plundered the surrounding country, also laying waste Hansi and Hisar. In February 1778, Gajpat Singh joined other Sikh chiefs in penetrating the Ganga Doab as far as Khurja, 83 km south of Delhi, scouring the country between the Jamuna and the Ganga. The Sikhs were expelled from the Doab by Mughal forces toward the end of April 1778 and the Sikh chiefs subsequently came to terms, promising to refrain from plundering the royal domains.

=== Abdul Ahad's campaign and Gajpat Singh's role, 1779 ===
In June 1779, Abdul Ahad Khan, accompanied by Prince Farkhundah Bakht, led an expedition against the Cis-Satluj Sikhs and encamped at Karnal. Gajpat Singh paid homage to the Prince and quickly became the Nawab's principal confidant and adviser. At Baghel Singh's instigation, the Nawab briefly imprisoned Gajpat Singh to extract money and he was released upon promising two lakh rupees. He played an important mediating role in negotiations involving Desu Singh of Kaithal and Amar Singh of Patiala, brokering agreements and securing releases of hostages. The campaign ultimately ended in failure and Abdul Ahad's retreat, during which Gajpat Singh took no part in harassing the Mughal army.

=== Grant of the title of Maharaja, 1781 ===
On 2 June 1781, Gajpat Singh was sent under escort to Delhi, where on 4 June he was presented before the wazir Najaf Khan. On 12 July, Najaf Khan fixed Gajpat Singh's tribute at six lakh rupees, of which three lakhs were realised immediately, with Gajpat Singh's son retained as hostage for the balance. In recognition, Najaf Khan conferred on him the title of Maharaja, together with robes of honour, a jewelled ornament for the turban, a sword, a necklace of pearls, a frilled palankeen, a horse, and an elephant.

== Relations with Patiala ==
Gajpat Singh maintained consistently cordial relations with Patiala throughout his reign. He rendered assistance in suppressing the revolt of Prince Himmat Singh in 1765 and again in 1772, and helped the Patiala chief during the siege of Bathinda fort in 1771. He joined Amar Singh in plundering crownlands in 1776 and accompanied him on expeditions against Hari Singh Dallewalia of Sialba. Even after Amar Singh's death in 1781, he gave full assistance to Diwan Nanun Mai in restoring peace and order in Patiala, and when the new ruler Sahib Singh was still an adolescent, Gajpat Singh attended at Patiala with his contingent to render support.

== Administration ==
Gajpat Singh exercised formidable influence with Mughal officials and imperial officers at times recommended the cancellation of portions of his revenue arrears. Unlike most Sikh chiefs of the era, he continued to acknowledge Mughal authority and paid revenue to the Emperor, styling himself malguzar. The revenue of the Jind state amounted to between six and seven lakh rupees, and is also reported to have been raised to sixteen lakhs. His army consisted of 1,500 horse and 500 foot.

== Personal life ==
Gajpat Singh married the daughter of Kishan Singh Mansahia, by whom he had four children: three sons, Mehar Singh, Bhag Singh, and Bhup Singh, and a daughter, Raj Kaur. Raj Kaur was married to Mahan Singh Sukerchakia of Gujranwala in 1774 and became the mother of Maharaja Ranjit Singh. On the death of his elder brother Alam Singh in 1754, Gajpat Singh also married his brother's widow, through whom he succeeded to the estate of Balanwali and this wife gave birth to a daughter named Begama.

Gajpat Singh divided his estate among his three sons during his own lifetime. His eldest son Mehar Singh was assigned Khanna but predeceased his father in 1780, leaving a son, Hari Singh, who was placed in possession of Safidon. The second son, Bhag Singh, remained at Jind with his father. The youngest son, Bhup Singh, was assigned Badrukhan and Barandhpur.

== Death and legacy ==
Hari Ram Gupta states that he died on 18 January 1786 at Safidon, having contracted a fever during an expedition to recover Patiala villages near Ambala. While Sikh Historians such as Ganda Singh, Harbans Singh and Bhagat Singh all record his death as 11 November 1789 at Safidon, likewise following an illness contracted during an expedition against refractory villages near Ambala. He was aged approximately fifty-one and a half years at the time of his death.

Gajpat Singh is described as a brave and intrepid ruler and "a remarkable man and a prominent figure in those troublous times." He took part in not fewer than thirty engagements and extended his territories considerably. By founding the principality of Jind and negotiating its formal recognition by the Mughal crown, he established one of the enduring Sikh successor states of the eighteenth century. His descendants ruled Jind as a princely state under British paramountcy until the accession of the state to independent India in 1948. His most lasting dynastic legacy was through his daughter Raj Kaur, whose son Maharaja Ranjit Singh united the Sikh Punjab under a single sovereign and founded the Sikh Empire.

== Bibliography ==
- Bhagata, Singh (1993). A History of the Sikh Misals. Patiala: Publication Bureau, Punjabi University.
- Gupta, Hari Ram (1978). History of the Sikhs: The Sikh Commonwealth or Rise and Fall of Sikh Misls. Vol. 4 (3rd, illustrated ed.). New Delhi: Munshiram Manoharlal Publishers. ISBN 9788121501651.
- Ganda Singh (1985). Ganda Singh (ed.). The Panjab Past and Present. Vol. 19. Patiala: Department of Punjab Historical Studies, Punjabi University.
- Harbans Singh (1992). The Encyclopaedia of Sikhism. Vol. 2 (E–L). Patiala: Punjabi University. ISBN 8173802041.
