= Raid of Panipat (1770) =

Battle in Sikh-Mughal War

- Part of Mughal-Sikh Wars
Date	4–10 January 1770
Location	Panipat
Result	Indecisive

Belligerents
Dal Khalsa	Kingdom of Rohilkhand; Mughal Empire

Commanders and leaders
Jassa Singh Ahluwalia; Baghel Singh	Najib ad-Dawlah; Zabita Khan

Strength
20,000+	Unknown

Casualties and losses
Unknown	Unknown

The Raid of Panipat (1770) was a raid on 4 January 1770 by the Sikh forces led by Jassa Singh Ahluwalia against the Mughal forces led by Zabita Khan.

== Background ==
During the winter of 1767, after Diwali, the Sikhs moved near the territory of Panipat. Najib ad-Dawlah came with his army to fight against them. However, he realised that he couldn't fight the Khalsa and saw their control over places like Sirhind and Lahore. The Mughals were scared of the Sikhs attacking Delhi since they would most likely lose their capital. Therefore, Najib wrote a letter to the Mughal emperor Shah Alam II to resign his task of Delhi.

In March 1768, Najib finally resigned. His son Zabita Khan was appointed the task to defend Delhi. He was told by his father to settle matters with the Sikhs either through a battle or by reaching a compromise.

== Battle ==
In January 1770, the Sikhs entered the estates of Najib. The Sikhs raided and plundered Panipat on January 4. Zabita Khan came to oppose them. The Sikhs demanded a large sum as the price of their friendship. Zabita declined to even entertain such proposals. The Sikhs advanced from Panipat plundering villages around Panipat, Sonepat and Karnal area.

== Aftermath ==
The Sikhs reached Delhi on 10 January. No action was fought due to the wait for reinforcements. When they arrived, Zabita Khan put up strong resistance, and the Sikhs offered Khan one lakh rupees to withdraw from the countryside around Delhi. Negotiations failed, and the Sikhs were forced to retreat. Najib ad-Dawlah died on 31 October 1770 which made Zabita Khan the second richest person in northern India.

== See also ==
- Nihang
- Martyrdom and Sikhism
- First Battle of Panipat
- Second Battle of Panipat
- Third Battle of Panipat
