= Siege of Patiala (1779) =

18th c. military action

- Part of Abdul Ahad's Patiala campaign
Date	7–14 October 1779
Location	Patiala
Result	Patiala-Sikh victory

Belligerents
Patiala; Supported by Dal Khalsa	Mughal Empire

Commanders and leaders
Raja Amar Singh; Tara Singh Ghaiba; Jassa Singh Ahluwalia; Baghel Singh; Jai Singh Kanhaiya; Haqiqat Singh Kanhaiya; Jassa Singh Ramgarhia; Jodh Singh; Tirlok Singh; Amar Singh Bagha; Amar Singh Kingra; Sada Singh; Mohan Singh Nishanwala; Anup Singh Nishanwala	Abdul Ahad Khan; Prince Farkhunda Bakht

Strength
75,000–215,000: 15,000 from Patiala; 60,000–200,000 Reinforcements	50,000; 200 pieces of cannon

Casualties and losses
Unknown	Unknown

The siege of Patiala was a 7-day siege fought between the Sikh forces led by Raja Amar Singh and Mughal forces led by Abdul Ahad Khan.

== Background ==
From 8 June to 18 October 1779, Abdul Ahad Khan was leading a campaign against the Patiala State.

== Siege ==
The combined forces of Tara Singh Ghaiba and Raja Amar Singh numbering around 15,000 fought a fierce battle on the 7th of October but were defeated. They both fell back to their fort. Meanwhile, the Mughals besieged Patiala. Fighting continued for 2 days, but the Mughals were not able to capture the fort.

Meanwhile, Amar Singh secretly received assistance from the Sikh chiefs such as the Kanhaiya sardars, Jassa Singh Ahluwalia, Jassa Singh Ramgarhia, and others. When the news of the Sikh army reached the Nawab, he immediately decided to retreat and claimed to Baghel Singh, "...that he had been asked by the emperor to return to Delhi." This took place on 14 October 1779.

== See also ==
- Nihang
- Martyrdom and Sikhism
