= Ghulam Kadir =

Afghan Rohilla leader (c. 1765–1789)

Mir Bakhshi of the Mughal Empire
- In office 5 September 1787 – 18 July 1788
- Preceded by: Zabita Khan

Personal details
- Born: Ghulam Abd al Qadir Ahmed Khan c. 1765
- Died: 3 March 1789 (aged 23–24) Mathura, Mughal Empire
- Parent: Zabita Khan (father)
- Relatives: Najib ad-Dawlah (grandfather)
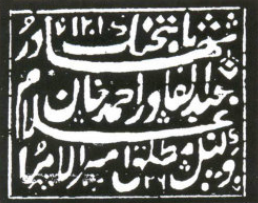
- Seal

Ghulam Kadir (c. 1765 – 3 March 1789), fully Ghulam Abd al Qadir Ahmed Khan, was a leader of the Afghan Rohilla during the late 18th century in the time of the Mughal Empire.

A son of Zabita Khan and grandson of Najib ad-Dawlah, he was a captive of the Mughal emperor Shah Alam II during parts of his youth before succeeding his father as leader of the Rohilla in 1785.

In 1787, Ghulam Kadir compelled Shah Alam II to appoint him as regent of the Mughal empire and as Mir Bakhshi, the head of the army. During the following year, he broke with the emperor and captured Delhi. He deposed the Shah and installed the prince Bidar Bakht as Mughal emperor, better known under his regnal name Jahan Shah. During the few weeks of the occupation of Delhi, many members of the Timurid imperial house were killed, the city was plundered and Shah Alam II was personally blinded by Ghulam Kadir.

After the recapture of Delhi by Maratha forces under the leadership of Mahadaji Shinde in October 1788, Ghulam Kadir was captured two months later. After his capture, his mutilation was ordered by Shinde at the behest of Shah Alam II and Ghulam Kadir was finally executed near Mathura on 3 March 1789, still in his twenties.

== Biography ==
=== Early life ===
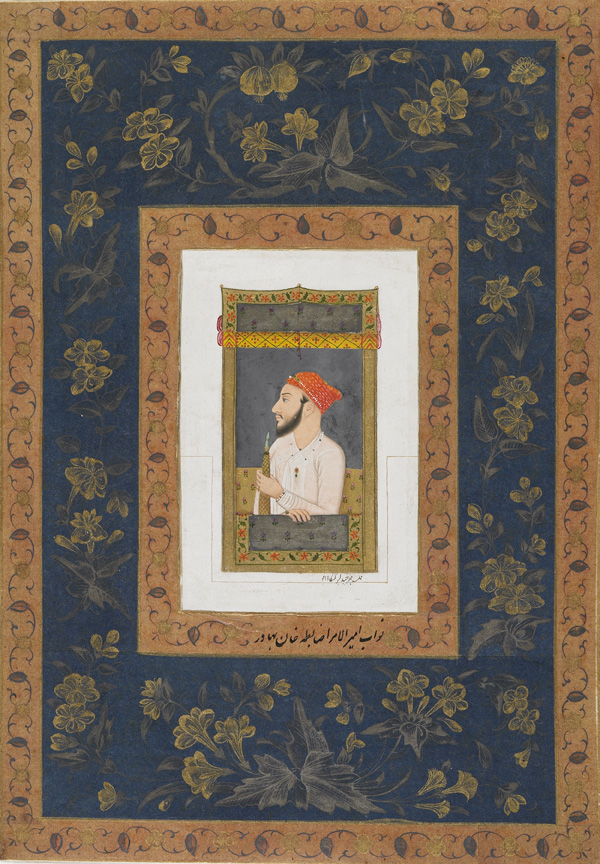
Portrait of Zabita Khan, the father of Ghulam Kadir, by Mihr Chand (c. 1770)

Ghulam Kadir was born c. 1765 as the son of Zabita Khan. His father had assumed the leadership of a branch of the Afghan Rohilla after the death of his own father Najib-ud-Daula on 31 October 1770. As the eldest son of Najib-ud-Daula, Zabita Khan had succeeded him and was invested as Mir Bakhshi (Head of the Mughal Army) by Shah Alam II on 29 December 1770, but did not pay the customary fee of succession to his father's estate and offices.

==== Imprisonment in the Qudsia Bagh ====
After conflicts had arisen between the Rohillas under Zabita Khan, Ghulam Kadir's father, and the Mughal emperor Shah Alam II, an imperial army under Mirza Najaf Khan was dispatched in 1777 against the Ghausgarh fort of the Rohillas. Ghausgarh was a mud fort built by Najib-ud-Daula, Ghulam Kadir's grandfather, about a mile of Jalalabad in today's Shamli district, Uttar Pradesh. After a decisive battle on 14 September 1777 Ghausgarh fort was captured and the Rohillas routed. Ghulam Kadir was captured on the battlefield, while his father managed to escape.

The captured Ghulam Kadir was taken to Delhi. There he grew up in a "gilded cage" in the Qudsia Bagh. Shah Alam II called Ghulam Kadir his son (farzand), granted him the title of Raushan-ud-Daula and even wrote poems about him, some of which have been preserved. Modern scholarship also notes that contemporary sources imply possible sexual relations between the emperor and his captive, without indicating their consensuality. The reported castration of Ghulam Kadir during his captivity, is, however, disputed, foremost by the Scottish historian William Dalrymple, because it was not mentioned in contemporary accounts.

As resentment against Ghulam Kadir grew in the palace, Shah Alam II sent him back to his father, Zabita Khan, who had regained the imperial favour once more and had again been established as Mir Bakhshi.

==== Leader of the Rohilla ====
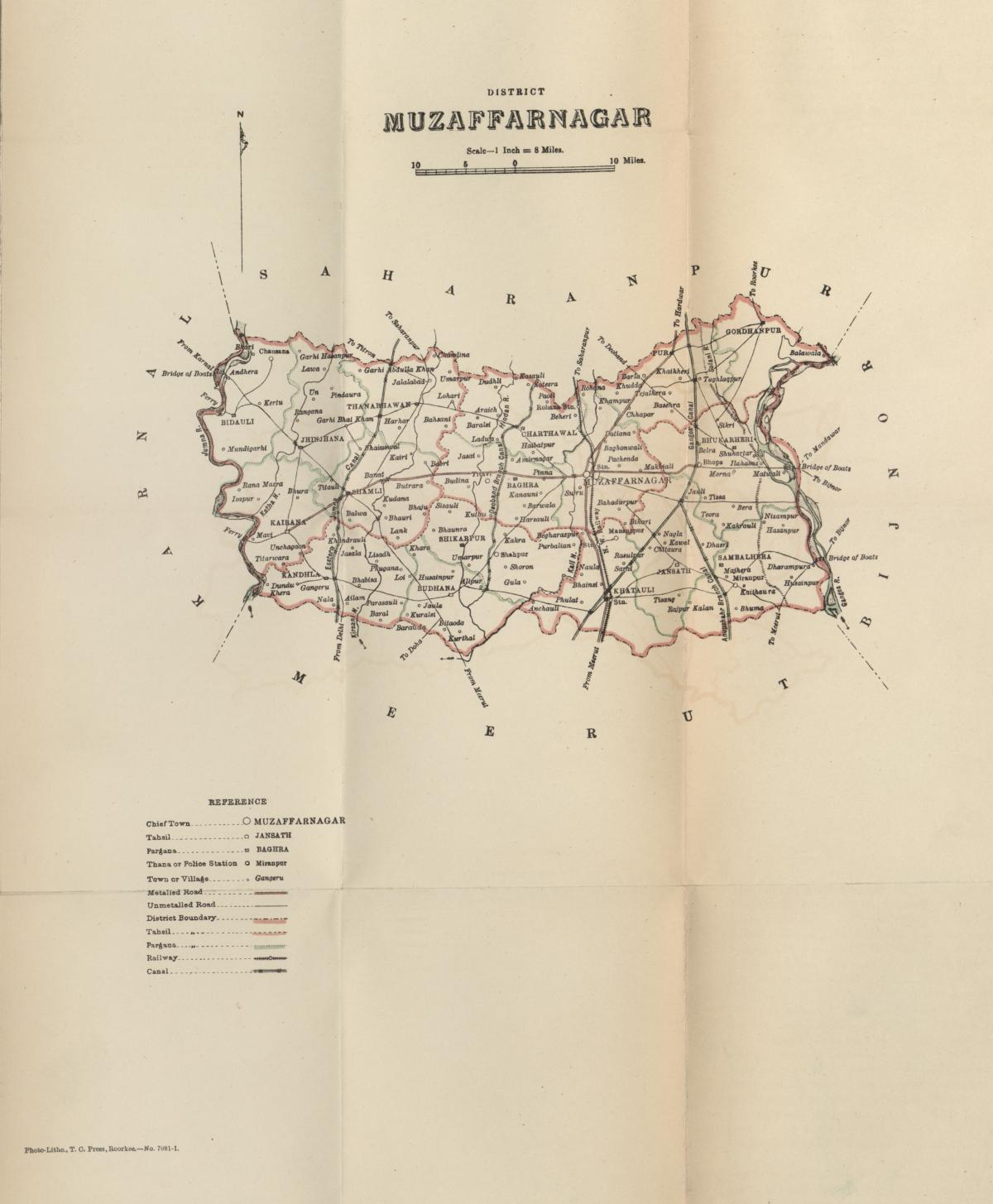
Muzaffarnagar district in a 1903 map. Ghausgarh was a mile south of Jalalabad, in the north-west of the district

After his father's death on 21 January 1785, Ghulam Kadir was able to assert himself as his successor and leader of the Rohilla, inheriting his father's estates under the title Najib-ud-daula Hoshyar Jang. He began his rule by seizing the lands of his relatives, including those of his uncle Afzal Khan, regaining the territories, which were formerly held by his grandfather Najib-ud-Daula, and strengthening his ancestral fort at Ghausgarh. His determination gained him the respect of the regional Sikh chiefs.

=== Campaign against Shah Alam II ===
==== Appointment as Mir Bakhshi and regent in September 1787 ====
In 1787 Ghulam Kadir wished to follow in his father's and grandfather's footsteps and become Mir Bakhshi of the Mughal Empire. To accomplish this feat, he demanded an audience with the emperor. At the Mughal court, the nazir – the superintendent of the Shah's harem –, Manzur Ali Khan (also transliterated as "Munsoor Ali Khan"), supported Ghulam Kadir's cause against Maratha resistance. According to the historian Jadunath Sarkar, the nazir – who is said to have personally saved Ghulam Kadir's life in Ghausgarh in 1777 – intended to use him to curb Hindu influence over the Mughal emperor.

As there were not enough men to defend Delhi, Ghulam Kadir entered the city on 26 August 1787 and was presented to the emperor by the nazir. On 5 September 1787 he entered the city again, this time at the head of 2,000 men. This action forced Shah Alam II to reluctantly establish him as Mir Bakhshi and regent of the Mughal empire and to grant him the title amir al-umara.

==== Struggle with Begum Samru in October 1787 ====
To consolidate his position at Shah Alam II's court, Ghulam Kadir tried to secure the support of Begum Samru, the wife of Walter Reinhardt, and ruler of the principality of Sardhana, who had considerable influence at this time. Furthermore, she commanded four battalions of French-led sepoys stationed in the city and was thus in a position to disobey the Empire's new regent.

Ghulam Kadir's efforts to secure her support were, however, fruitless, as Begum rejected a proposal for an alliance. After this rejection, he demanded her removal from the city and declared that he would otherwise begin hostilities. As this demand was not met, he started cannonading Salimgarh Fort and on 7 October 1787 the first cannonballs hit the imperial palace. Now the nazir intervened and was able to dissuade him from continuing his assault on the city.

Ghulam Kadir and his Rohillas then turned away from Delhi to conquer the crownlands in the Doab. This expansion led Lord Cornwallis to write a letter dated 14 November 1787 to Ghulam Kadir asserting that the East India Company would not militarily engage him, as long as he observed peace with the Company and their ally, the Nawab of Awadh. This demand was accepted by Ghulam Kadir.

==== Occupation of Delhi in 1788 ====
In July 1788 Ghulam Kadir joined forces with Ismail Beg and their attention focused again on Delhi. The small imperial Mughal army was sent to engage them, but due to treason its leaders led their units away. On 18 July 1788 Ghulam Kadir and Ismail Beg therefore took full possession of the city and of the Red Fort, after the nazir had tricked the Shah into granting them an audience and forbade any resistance by the Red Battalion on 15 July 1788.

Ghulam Kadir's occupation of Delhi lasted from 18 July 1788 to 2 October 1788, marking Delhi's last Afghan occupation to date. During these months he deposed Shah Alam II on the 30 July 1788 and installed the Mughal prince Bidar Bakht as the new emperor under the regnal name Nasir-ud-din Muhammad Jahan Shah (r. 31 July 1788 – 11 October 1788). Bidar Bakht was the son of Ahmed Shah, who was a beloved step-son of Malika-uz-Zamani; Bidar Bakht's enthronement was the result of a pact between Ghulam Kadir and Malika-uz-Zamani, who paid 12 lakhs of rupees to Ghulam Kadir to ensure her step-grandson's investiture. Badshah Begum wanted to see Shah Alam II deposed and laid low because Shah Alam's father, Alamgir II, had blinded and killed her beloved step-son, Ahmed Shah, in order to seize the throne.

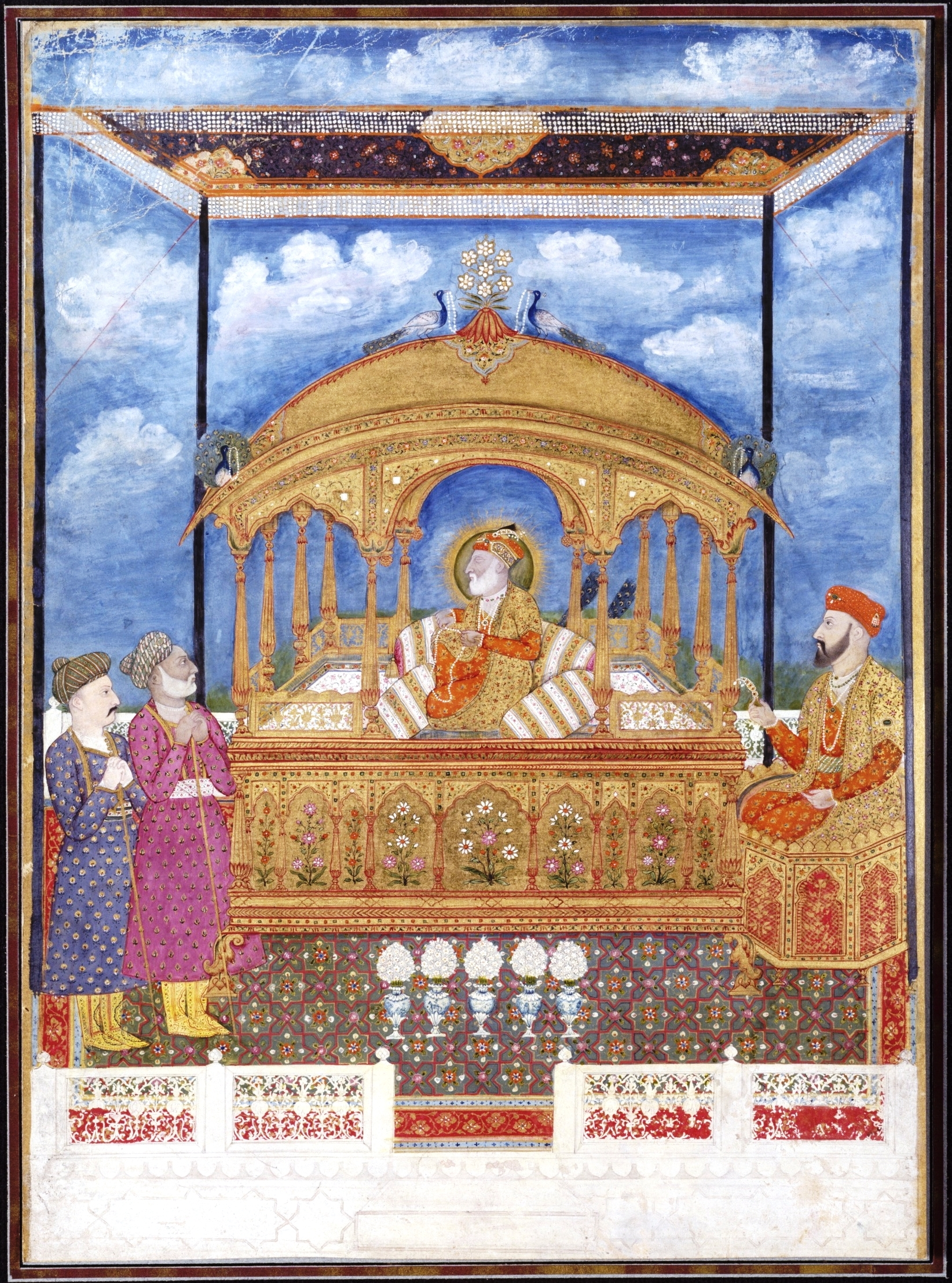
An image of Shah Alam II after being blinded by Ghulam Kadir. The image is attributed to Khairullah (c. 1800)

The occupation led to a reign of terror, during which Shah Alam II was blinded on 10 August 1788. According to tradition Ghulam Kadir said to the Shah immediately after his blinding that it was "the return for [his] action at Ghausgarh." In his quest to secure Mughal treasure, Ghulam Kadir tortured the Timurid imperial family and it is said that 21 princes and princesses were killed. The dishonouring behaviour towards the women of the imperial family is noted as especially cruel in the eyes of its time. Even Malika-uz-Zamani's fate turned as her palace was raided and she was placed on a riverbank. The nazir's house was next to be sacked and stripped of all belongings.

The plunder of Delhi resulted in losses amounting to 25 crore of rupees. According to Jadunath Sarkar, this "dance of demons" finally "ruined the prestige of the empire beyond recovery".

Ismail Beg was not rewarded for his part in the occupation and left the Rohillas in September 1788, when the Marathas mounted an offensive to free Delhi from Ghulam Kadir's occupation. This force was led by Mahadaji Shinde and it managed to occupy Old Delhi on 28 September 1788. Then an attack was conducted by the combined forces of the Marathas, of Begum Samru and of the turned Ismail Beg, which Ghulam Kadir's Rohillas could not withstand indefinitely. After the explosion of a powder magazine, that Ghulam Kadir saw as an omen, he abandoned Delhi Fort at 10 October 1788 with his remaining troops. On 16 October 1788 the now blind Shah Alam II was reinstated as Mughal emperor and on 17 October 1788 khutbah was read in his name. His formal coronation happened on 7 February 1789.

==== Escape and execution in 1789 ====
After the liberation of Delhi, a hunt for Ghulam Kadir was mounted by the Marathas. Ghulam Kadir fled to Mirat fort, which in turn was encircled by the Marathas. After the conditions there had become intolerable, he managed to break the encirclement during the night with 500 horsemen and tried to escape to Ghausgarh. But during the engagement of his horsemen by a Maratha patrol, he lost sight of his entourage. Then his horse stumbled and broke its leg and he had to continue his escape alone and on foot. He reached Bamnauli (Uttar Pradesh), where he sought refuge in a house of a Brahman and offered him a reward for a horse and a guide, who could lead him to Ghausgarh. But the Brahman recognized him and alerted a party of Marathas, who captured him on 18 December or 19 December 1788. According to Jadunath Sarkar and Herbert Compton, the saddlebags of Ghulam Kadir stuffed with valuables looted from Delhi fell into the hands of Lestineau, who took them to the United Kingdom for his retirement.

Ghulam Kadir remained in Maratha custody for some time but was not harmed. However, on 28 February 1789 Mahadaji Shinde received a letter by Shah Alam II, demanding the eyes of Ghulam Kadir as the Shah would otherwise retire to Mecca and live as a beggar. Then Mahadaji Shinde ordered his ears to be cut off, and the next days nose, tongue and upper lip were sent to the emperor in a casket. After this was done, his mutilation continued and his hands, feet and genitals were cut off, before he was hanged from a tree and beheaded at Mathura on 3 March 1789. His ears and eyeballs were sent to the Shah.

After Ghulam Kadir's execution the Ghausgarh fort of the Rohilla was abandoned. General Pierre Cuillier-Perron, the French mercenary, had ordered its rebuilding but the work was abandoned.

== In literature ==
Muhammad Iqbal created a nazm about Ghulam Kadir in Urdu ("Ghulam Qadir Ruhela"), which narrates the treatment of the Timurids during the Delhi occupation in 1788.
