= Upper Doab =

Geographical area in India

The Upper Doab is a geographical and cultural region in the Indian state of Uttar Pradesh and Uttrakhand. It is located between the rivers Ganga and Yamuna, in the northernmost part of the Yamuna Ganga doab.

== Geography ==
The Upper Doab contains the districts of Dehradun, Haridwar, Saharanpur, Muzzafarnagar, Shamli, Meerut, Bagpat, Bijnor,Ghaziabad, Hapur, Gautam Budh Nagar, Bulandshahr and Aligarh.

The geography of this region is flat, marked by irrigation canals. The region has heavy rainfall The total area of the region is 9173 sq miles.

== Agriculture ==
The Upper Doab region and Western Uttar Pradesh as a whole benefited significantly from the Green Revolution in the 1960s The main crop grown in the Upper Doab is sugarcane. Unlike in much of the rest of India, sugarcane is sold direct to sugarcane mills, rather than through the mandi system.

Among the problems faced by the industry is the shrinkage of farm sizes due to growing populations and division of farmland, and conversion of land to non-agricultural use.

== Demography ==
The majority of the population of the region is Hindu. Muslims are a sizeable minority, especially in Saharanpur

The dominant castes in the region are the Jats and Gurjars The Jat dominated part of the Doab was called "Herat" while the Gurjar dominated area was called "Goojerat". The Rajputs are present in eastern parts of Hapur and Bulandshahr, where the Bargurjar clan is prominent, and in regions adjacent to the Braj region, where some of them were Zamindars. These Rajputs rose in revolt in along with the Gurjars in the Indian Rebellion of 1857.

== Language ==
The languages spoken in the region are Hindi, Urdu and Gujari. The Khadiboli dialect is prominent.

== Economy ==
The economy of the Upper Doab has largely been agrarian in nature. In recent years service sector jobs have boomed in Noida. Ghaziabad is the largest industrial city in Uttar Pradesh, employing around five hundred forty thousand workers. Real estate has also become a lucrative business in the region.
