= Interamnia =

Interamnia – also, Interamna (Greek: Ἰντέραμνα) or Interamnium (Greek: Ἰντεράμνιον) – is an ancient Latin placename, meaning "between rivers". There were at least three towns of ancient Italy so named:

- Interamna Nahars (or Nahartium), the modern Terni: the rivers are the Nera and the Serra
- Interamna Praetutiana (or Interamna Praetutianorum), the modern Teramo: the rivers are the Tordino and the Vezzola
- Interamna Lirenas, no modern successor, on the Liri River

== Other ==
- 704 Interamnia, an asteroid named after the town of Teramo
- Interamnia World Cup, an international handball competition in Teramo
