= Zabita Khan =

Rohilla chieftain

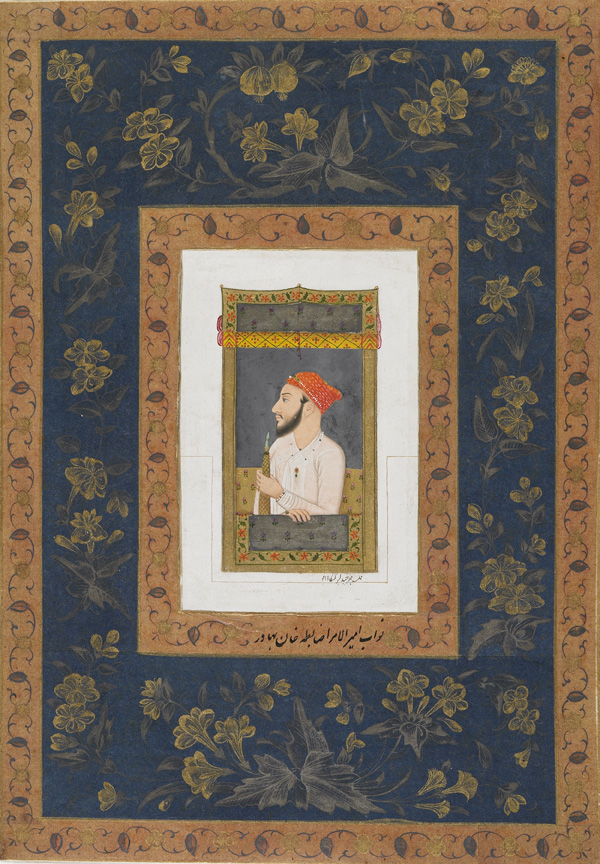
- Portrait of Zabita Khan by Mihr Chand (c. 1770)
- Died: 21 January 1785; Mehrauli, Delhi, Mughal Empire
- Resting place: Dargah Qutub Sahib; 28°31′09.41″N 77°10′49.3″E
- Children: Ghulam Qadir
- Father: Najib ad-Dawlah

Zabita Khan Rohilla (died 21 January 1785) was a Rohilla chieftain in the time of the Mughal Emperor Shah Alam II.

== Biography ==
Zabita Khan was the eldest son of Najib-ud-Daula, a leader of the Afghan Rohilla and founder of the city of Najibabad (UP). The Rohillas were Afghans who settled between Delhi and the Himalaya with Bareilly as their first city. They were led by individual chieftains. In the mid-18th century, their most important chieftains were Najib-ud-Daula, Hafiz Rahmat Khan and Ahmad Khan Bangash.

Zabita Khan is known to have fought alongside his father during the Third Battle of Panipat in 1761.

In March 1768 Najib-ud-Daula retired his leadership over the Rohillas and declared Zabita Khan to be his successor, while he moved to Najibabad. Two of Najib-ud-Daula's high-ranking officers resisted (Ali Muhammed Kur and Sayyid Mian Asrar-ud-din [also known as Lambi Mian]) but were crushed by Zabita Khan. On 15 October 1769 Najib-ud-Daula went to Delhi, where Zabita Khan was hosted by the Dowager Empress and the Crown Prince.

At the time of his father's death on 31 October 1770, Zabita Khan was said to be the second richest person in northern India after the Jat King. As his father's eldest son he was invested as Mir Bakhshi (Head of the Mughal Army) by Shah Alam II on 29 December 1770. During his rule, the Marathas captured, first Delhi in 1771 and then Rohilkhand in 1772, forcing him to flee to the camp of the Nawab of Awadh, Shuja-ud-Daula. He also failed to prevent the Sikh Khalsa occupation of Delhi during the Battle of Delhi (1783).

== Death ==
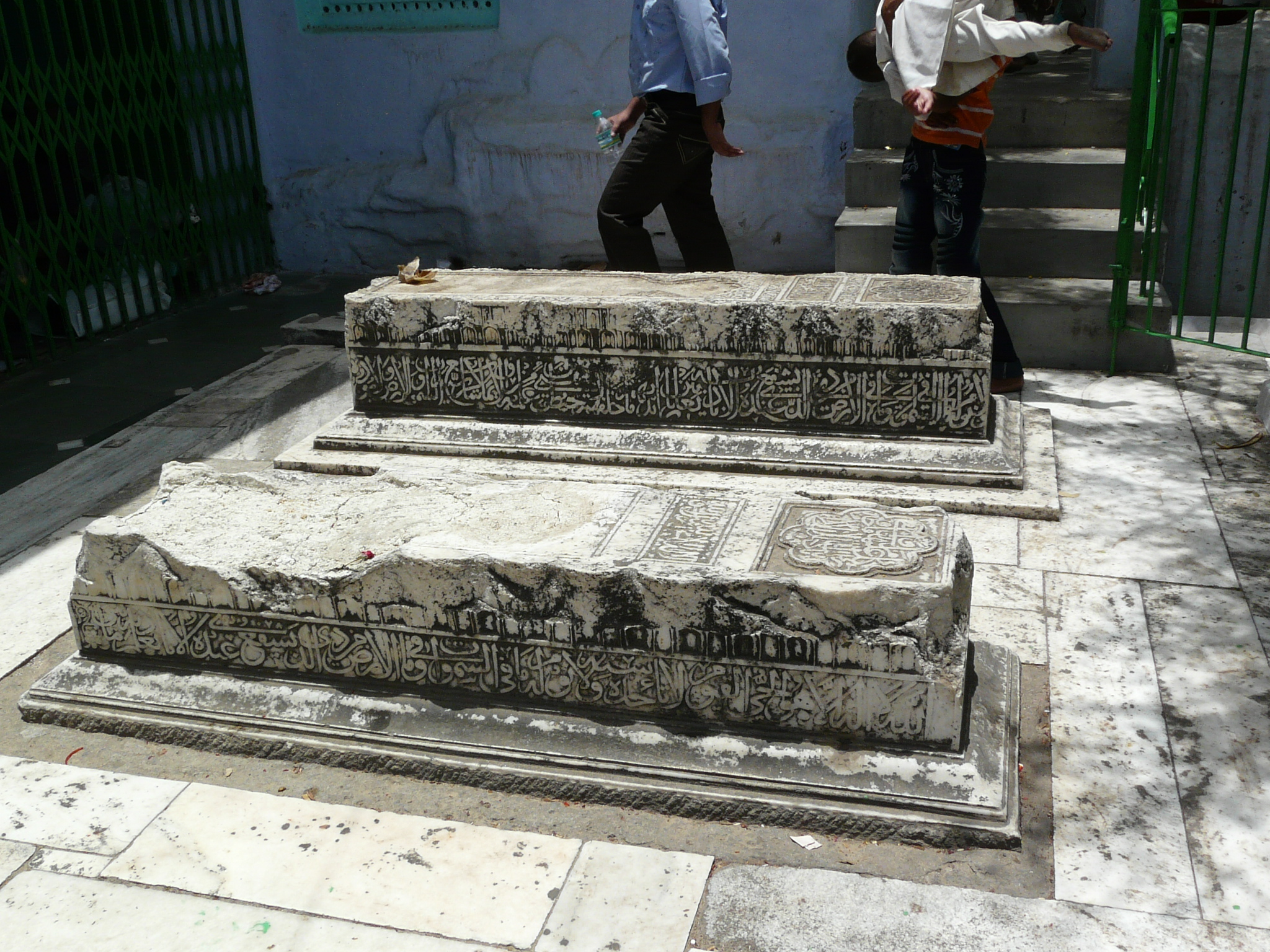
Grave of Zabita Khan in the Dargah Qutub Sahib

Zabita Khan died on 21 January 1785. He was succeeded by his son Ghulam Qadir. His grave is in the courtyard of the Dargah Qutub Sahib in Mehrauli, a shrine dedicated to the Sufi mystic Qutbuddin Bakhtiar Kaki, and preserved to this day. Some allege that he is buried next to his son Ghulam Qadir, though most consider it more likely that the adjacent grave belongs to Zabita Khan's wife.

== Legacy ==
Zabita Khan founded the Masjid Zabta Ganj, a mosque in Delhi, which is still operated.

== See also ==
- Shah Alam II
- Ghulam Qadir
- Mirza Najaf Khan
- Raid of Panipat (1770)

== Bibliography ==
- Fanshawe, Herbert Charles (1902). Delhi Past and Present. London: John Murray.
- Francklin, William (1798). The History of the Reign of Shah-Aulum, The present emperor of Hindostaun. London: Cooper and Graham.
- Gupta, Hari Ram (1944). History of the Sikhs. Vol. II. The Minerva Bookshop.
- Malik, Zahiruddin (1982). "Persian Documents pertaining to the tragic End of Ghulam Qadir Rohilla, 1780–1789". Proceedings of the Indian History Congress. 43: 565–571. ISSN 2249-1937. JSTOR 44141288.
- Lal, Munna (1970). "Tarikh-i-Shah Alam". In Khobrekar, V. G. (ed.). Maharashtra Archives: Bulletin of the Department of Archives. Vol. 5. Translated by Sarkar, Jadunath. Bombay: Government Printing and Stationery. pp. 1–46.
- Rathod, N. G. (1994). The Great Maratha Mahadaji Scindia. Sarup & Sons. ISBN 9788185431529.
- Sarkar, Jadunath (1950). Fall of the Mughal Empire. Vol. II (2 ed.). Calcutta: M. C. Sarkar & Sons.
- ——————— (1952). Fall of the Mughal Empire. Vol. III (2 ed.). Calcutta: M. C. Sarkar & Sons.
- Strachey, John (1892). Hastings and the Rohilla War. Oxford: Clarendon Press.
- Zail, Mahrauli (1922). List of Muhammadan and Hindu Monuments. Vol. III. Calcutta: Superintendent Government Printing, India.
