= Doab =

Land between two converging, or confluent, rivers

- Natural region
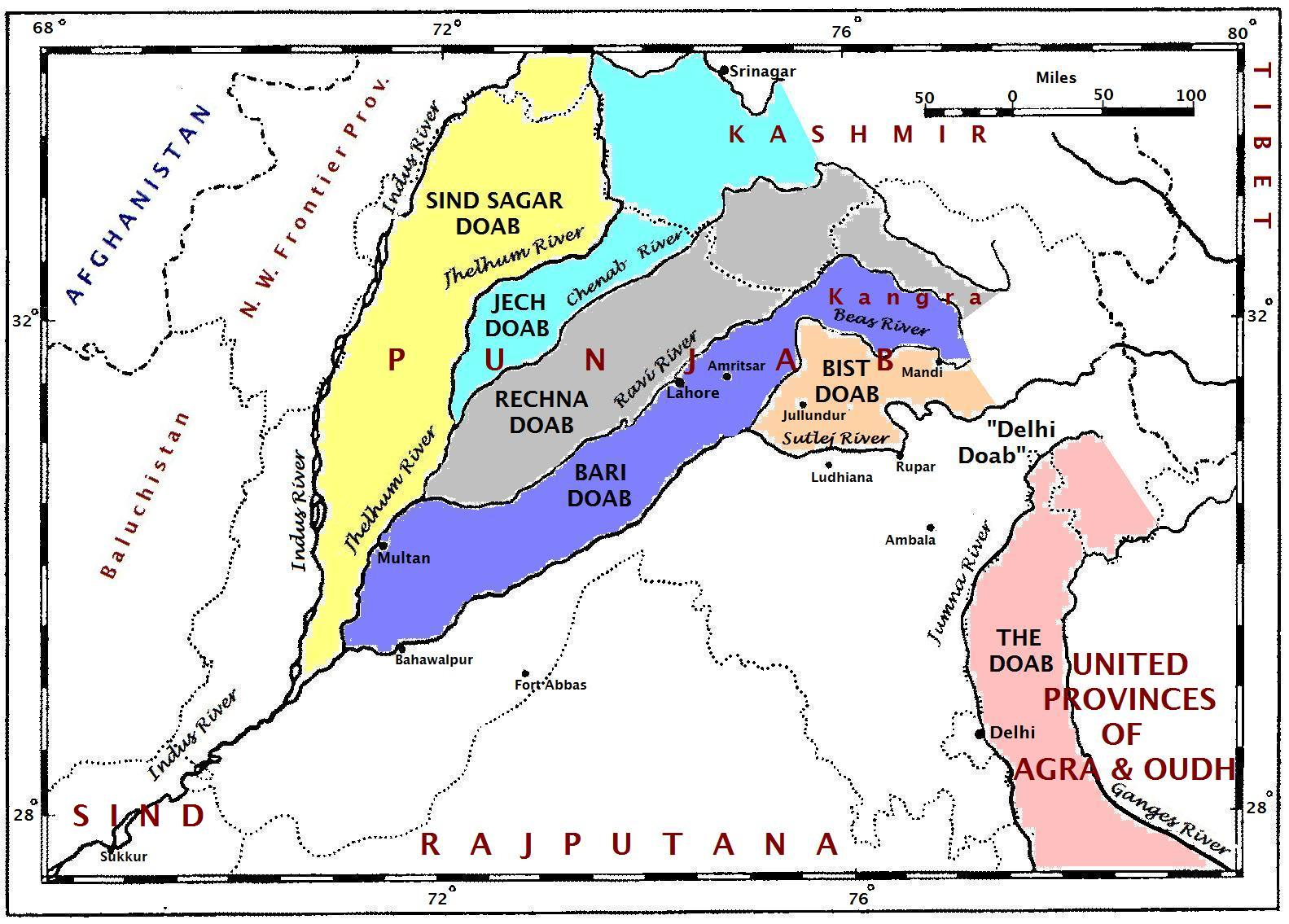
- A map showing the different doabs in the northern subcontinent
- Region: Indian subcontinent

Doab (English: /ˈdoʊɑːb/) is a term used in South Asia for the tract of land lying between two confluent rivers. It is similar to an interfluve. In the Oxford Hindi-English Dictionary, R. S. McGregor refers to its Persian origin in defining it as do-āb (دوآب, literally "two [bodies of] water") "a region lying between and reaching to the confluence of two rivers." As per J. S. Grewal, a doab is "the inter-fluvial area between any two rivers".

== Khadir, bangar, barani, nali and bagar ==
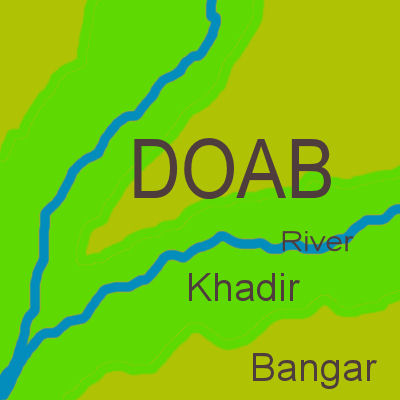
In any doab, khadir land (green) lies next to a river, while bangar land (olive) has greater elevation and lies further from the river

Since North India and Pakistan are coursed by a multiplicity of Himalayan rivers that divide the plains into doabs (i.e. regions between two rivers), the Indo-Gangetic plains consist of alternating regions of river, khadir and bangar. The regions of the doabs near the rivers consist of low-lying, floodplains, but usually, very fertile khadir and the higher-lying land away from the rivers consist of bangar, less prone to flooding but also less fertile on average.

Khadir may also be called nali or naili in northern Haryana, where it refers to the fertile prairie tract between the Ghaggar river and the southern limits of the Saraswati channel depression, which gets flooded during the rainy season.

Within bangar area, the barani is any low rain area where the rain-fed dry farming is practiced, which nowadays are dependent on the tubewells for irrigation. Bagar tract, an example of barani land, is the dry sandy tract of land on the border of Rajasthan state adjoining the states of Haryana and Punjab. Nahri is any canal-irrigated land, for example, the Rangoi tract which is an area irrigated by the Rangoi channel/canal made for the purpose of carrying flood waters of Ghagghar river to dry areas.

Historically, villages in the doabs have been officially classified as khadir, khadir-bangar (i.e. mixed) or bangar for many centuries, and different agricultural tax rates applied based on a tiered land-productivity scale.

== Ganga-Yamuna Doab ==
The Doab

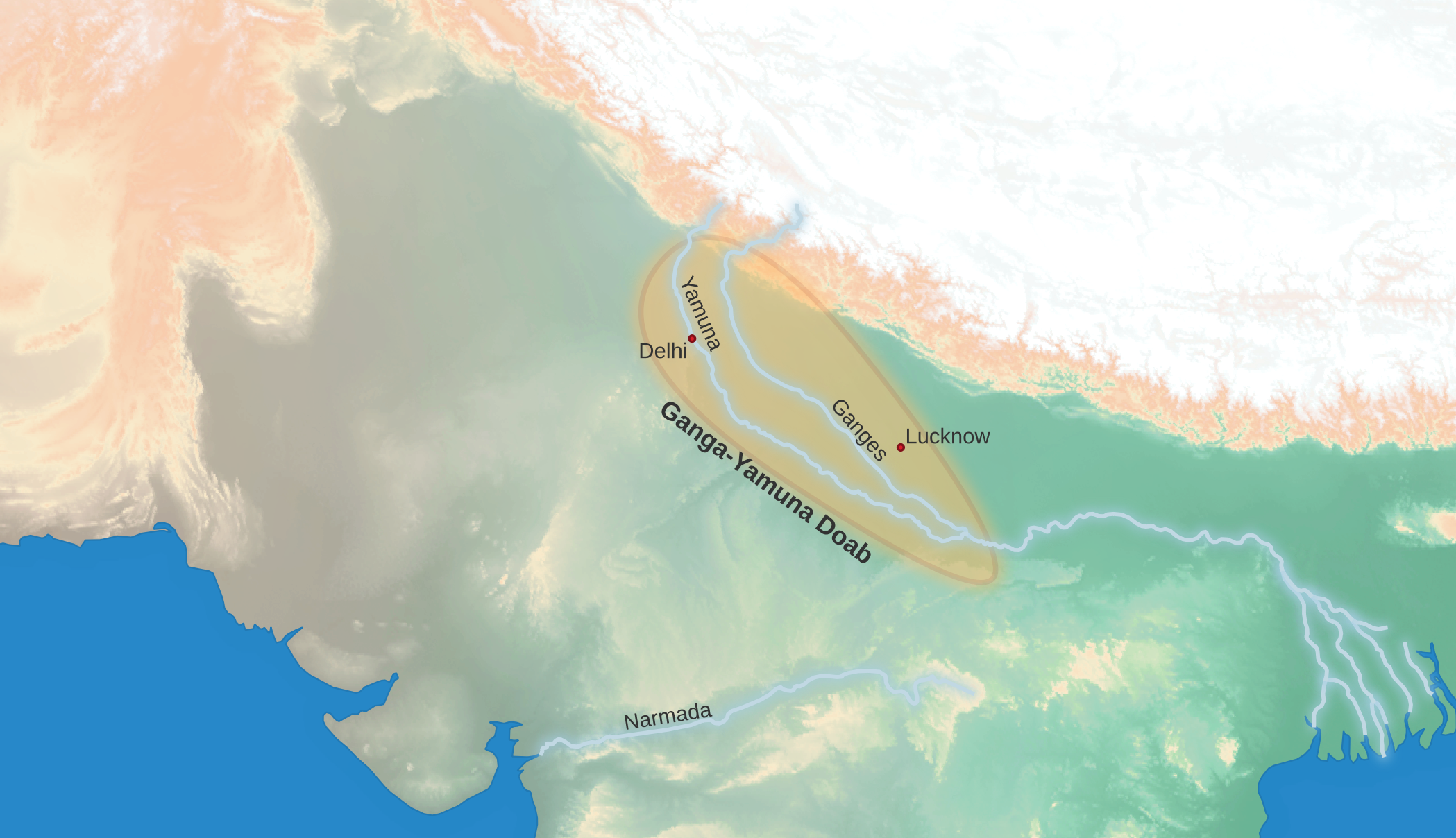
Area depicting the Ganges-Yamuna Doab.

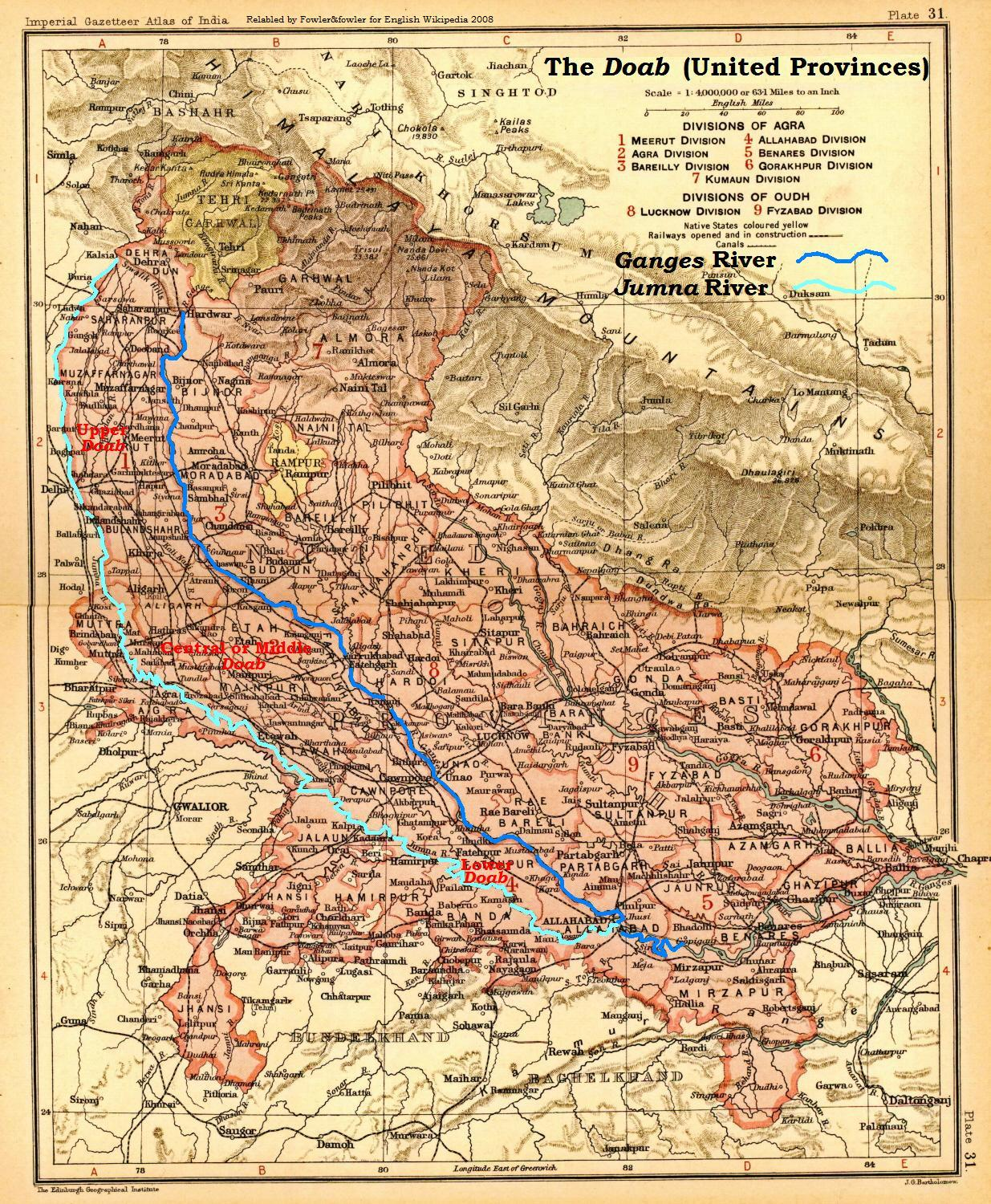
A 1908 map of the Doab, United Provinces

The Ganga-Yamuna Doab, also known simply as The Doab, is the flat alluvial tract between the Ganges and Yamuna rivers extending from the Sivalik Hills to the two rivers' confluence at Prayagraj. It is also called as Ganges-Yamuna Doab or Ganga Doab. The region has an area of about 23,360 square miles (60,500 square km); it is approximately 500 miles (805 km) in length and 60 miles (97 km) in width. In ancient times, it was known as Antarvedi. It is the most populated and largest of the doabs of India and can be divided into three sections: Upper (Haridwar to Aligarh), Middle, and Lower.

The British Raj divided the Doab into three administrative districts, viz., Upper Doab (Meerut), Middle Doab (Agra) and Lower Doab (Allahabad).

Currently the following states and districts form part of The Doab:

=== Upper Doab ===
Main article : Upper Doab

- Uttarakhand:

Dehradun and Haridwar

- Uttar Pradesh:

Saharanpur, Shamli, Muzaffarnagar, Baghpat, Meerut, Ghaziabad, Hapur, Gautam Buddh Nagar and Bulandshahr

- Delhi

=== Central or Middle Doab ===
Etah, Kasganj, Aligarh, Agra, Hathras, Firozabad, Mainpuri and Mathura is in the trans-Yamuna region of Braj.

=== Lower Doab ===
Farrukhabad, Kannauj, Etawah, Auraiya, Kanpur (Urban & Rural), Fatehpur, Kaushambi and Allahabad.

== Punjab Doabs ==
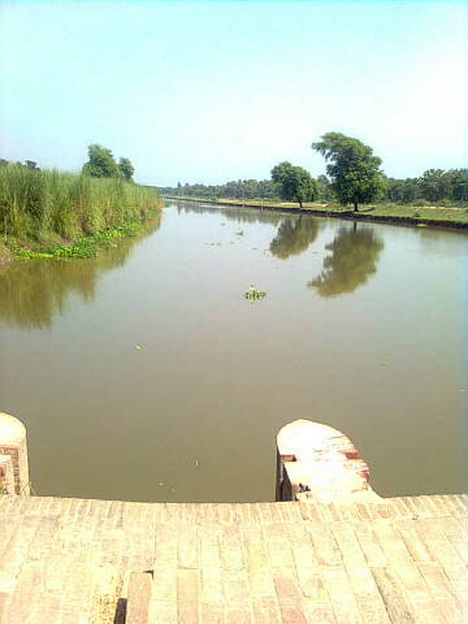
View of a canal in the lower Bari Doab of the Punjab Doabs

Each of the tracts of land lying between the confluent rivers of the Punjab region of Pakistan and India has a distinct name, said to have been coined by Raja Todar Mal, a minister of the Mughal emperor Akbar. The names (except for "Sindh Sagar") are a combination of the first letters, in the Persian alphabet, of the names of the rivers that bound the Doab. For example, "Chaj" (چج) = Chanāb (چناب, "Chenab") + Jehlam (جہلم, "Jhelum"). The names are from east to west. The practice of dividing regions of Punjab into doabs dates to the reign of Akbar. The doabs of Punjab are not to be confused with its bārs, which according to Grewal (1999) refers to the upland section between two river valleys in the Punjab plains. The introduction of artificial irrigation by well (Saqiyah) in the 11th century in Punjab after the Turkic conquest of the area allowed for an increased population in the northern sections of the region's doabs.

Another way of dividing up the regions of Punjab (which is not well demarcated and often confusing) is based upon bet (area prone to flooding and comes into the flow of rivers), dhaha (old-bed of a river which are high and sandy but still at risk of flooding), and dakar (far-away from river-banks and usually safe from flooding).

=== Sind Sagar Doab ===
The Sind Sagar Doab lies between the Indus and Jhelum rivers.

=== Chaj Doab ===
The Chaj Doab lies between the Jhelum and the Chenab rivers.

=== Rachna Doab ===
The Rachna Doab lies between the Chenab and the Ravi rivers. A considerable portion of the Rechna Doab is in the Majha region.

=== Bari Doab ===
The Bari Doab lies between the Ravi and Beas rivers. A considerable portion of the Bari Doab is in the Majha region.

=== Bist Doab ===
The Bist Doab (or Doaba) - between the Beas and the Sutlej rivers. Also known as the Bist Jalandhar Doab.

== Other doabs ==
=== Raichur Doab ===
The Raichur Doab is the triangular region of Andhra Pradesh and Karnataka states which lies between the Krishna River and its tributary the Tungabhadra River, named for the town of Raichur.

== See also ==
- Punjab, land lying between five rivers
- Ap (water)
- Interamnia, an ancient Latin placename, meaning "between rivers"
- Mesopotamia, in Ancient Greek: Μεσοποταμία '[land] between rivers'.
