= William Francklin =

English orientalist and army officer

William Francklin (1763–1839) was an English orientalist and army officer.

== Education and military career ==
Francklin was the eldest son of Thomas Francklin, by his wife Miss Venables. He was admitted on the foundation at Westminster in 1777, whence he was elected to Trinity College, Cambridge, in 1781.

Preferring to engage in the profession of arms, he was admitted a cadet in the service of the East India Company in 1782, appointed ensign of the 19th regiment of Bengal Native Infantry 31 Jan. 1783; lieutenant 20 Oct. 1789; captain in the army 7 June 1796; captain in his regiment 30 Sept. 1803; major in the army 25 April 1808; major in his regiment 29 March 1810; lieutenant-colonel in the army 4 June 1814, and in his regiment on 16 Dec. of the same year. On being invalided, 1 Oct. 1815, he was made regulating officer at Bhagalpur.

He retired in India in December 1825, and died 12 April 1839, aged 76.

== Career as an orientalist ==
A distinguished officer, Francklin also enjoyed considerable reputation as an oriental scholar. In 1786 he made a tour in Persia, in the course of which he resided for eight months at Shiraz as an inmate of a Persian family, and was thus enabled to communicate a fuller account of the manners of the people than had before appeared. His journal was published as Observations made on a Tour from Bengal to Persia in … 1786–7; with a short account of the remains of the … Palace of Persepolis, 4to, Calcutta, 1788 (reprinted in vol. ix. of John Pinkerton's General Collection of Voyages, 4to, 1808, &c.). A French version, Voyage du Bengal à Chyraz, was published in vols. ii. and iii. of Collection portative de voyages traduits de différentes langues orientales, 12mo, Paris (1797, &c.). His next work, The History of the Reign of Shah-Aulum, the present Emperor of Hindostan. … With an Appendix, 4to, London, 1798, serves as an important continuation of the Siyar Ul-Mutakherin (View of Modern Times) by Ghulam Husain Tabatabai.

Francklin also published:

- The Loves of Camarúpa and Cámalatà, an ancient Indian Tale … translated from the Persian (of Tahsin al-Din), 12mo, London, 1793.
- Remarks and Observations on the Plain of Troy, made during an Excursion in June 1799, 4to, London, 1800.
- Military Memoirs of Mr. George Thomas, who … rose … to the rank of a General in the service of the native powers in … India. … Compiled and arranged from Mr. Thomas's original documents (Appendix), 4to, Calcutta, 1803; 8vo, London, 1805.
- Tracts, Political, Geographical, and Commercial; on the dominions of Ava, and the North-Western parts of Hindostaun, 8vo, London, 1811.
- Miscellaneous Remarks, in two parts: 1st. On Vincent's "Geography of Susiana". 2nd. Supplementary Note on the Site of the ancient City of Palibothra (Pataliputra), 4to, Calcutta, 1813.
- Inquiry concerning the Site of ancient Palibothra, &c. 4 pts. 4to, London, 1815–22.
- Researches on the Tenets and Doctrines of the Jeynes and Boodhists; conjectured to be the Brachmanes of ancient India. In which is introduced a discussion on the worship of the serpent in various countries of the world, 4to, London, 1827.
- To vol. iv. of Asiatick Researches (1795), pp. 419–32, he contributed An Account of the present State of Delhi; while to vol. ii. of Miscellaneous Translations from Oriental Languages, published in 1834 by the Oriental Translation Fund, he furnished an Account of the Grand Festival held by the Amír Timur … A. H. 803. Translated … from the "Mulfuzat Timuri", or Life of Timur, written by himself.

== Other literary activity ==
In 1837 he published his father's historical play, Mary Queen of Scots.

He maintained a learned correspondence with Dean Vincent, who was second master during the time he was at Westminster; and Francklin was one of the few persons to whom the dean acknowledged obligations in the preface to the Periplus, 1800–5. Francklin was a member, and during the later years of his life librarian and member of the council, of the Royal Asiatic Society. He was also a member of the Asiatic Society of Calcutta.

== Works ==
- William Francklin (1798). The History of the reign of Shah-Aulum (Shah Alam), the present emperor of Hindostaun. Cooper & Graham, London.
