= Mirza Najaf Khan =

Mughal military commander (1723–1782)

Najaf Khan
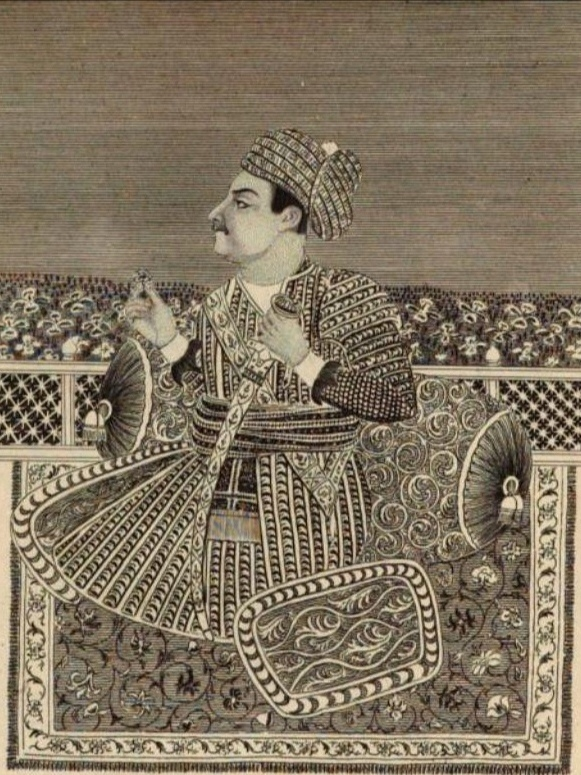
- Najaf Khan Zulfiqar al-Dawlah

Mir Bakshi of the Mughal Empire
- In office c. 1772 – 26 April 1782
- Monarch: Shah Alam II
- Preceded by: Najib al-Dawlah
- Succeeded by: Najaf Quli Khan

Personal details
- Born: c. 1723 Safavid Empire
- Died: 26 April 1782 (aged 58–59) Delhi, Maratha Empire
- Resting place: Najaf Khan Tomb, near Safdarjung Tomb, Delhi
- Relations: Najaf Quli Khan (adopted son)

Military service
- Allegiance: Mughal Empire
- Branch/service: Mughal Army
- Years of service: 1772–1782
- Rank: Mir Bakhshi (Commander-in-Chief)
- Battles/wars: Maratha-Mughal conflicts; Campaigns against Rohillas and Jats

Mīrzā Najaf Khān Bahādur, simply known as Mirza Najaf Khan (1723 – 26 April 1782) was a Mughal nobleman and adventurer of Safavid lineage who came to Delhi around 1740 from Iran after Nader Shah had displaced the Safavid dynasty in 1736. He became a courtier of Mughal emperor Shah Alam II (1740 – 1782). Najaf Khan has been called the "last great general of the Mughal Empire" as after his death, the control of the Mughal territories was taken over by Mahadaji Shinde in 1784/5, and the Mughal authority got reduced to the walls of Delhi.

Najaf Khan married his sister into the family of the Shia Nawabs of Awadh, which resulted in him gaining the title of Deputy Wazir of Awadh, and himself married the daughter of Najib ad-Dawlah. He served during the Battle of Buxar, and was the highest commander of the Mughal army from 1772 till his death in April 1782.

== Career ==
He was more successful than his predecessor Najib ad-Dawlah, the Rohilla Afghan appointed by Ahmad Shah Durrani to protect the Mughal throne. Najaf Khan's rival in court of Shah Alam was Nawab Majad-ud-Daulah who used the Sikh misls to cause panic among the Mughals and continuously keep Najaf Khan's forces busy. He is also credited for renaming the city of Aligarh, formerly known as Kol.

Mirza Najaf Khan was an extremely capable commander, acquainted with European military tactics. He led several successful campaigns for the Mughal emperor. He has also been praised by contemporary biographers to be benevolent, loyal and polite. Due to courtly intrigue set by his rivals, like Abdul Ahad Khan, a coldness in relationship had developed between him and the emperor. However, the relationship had been mended by the time of his death due to Tuberculosis.

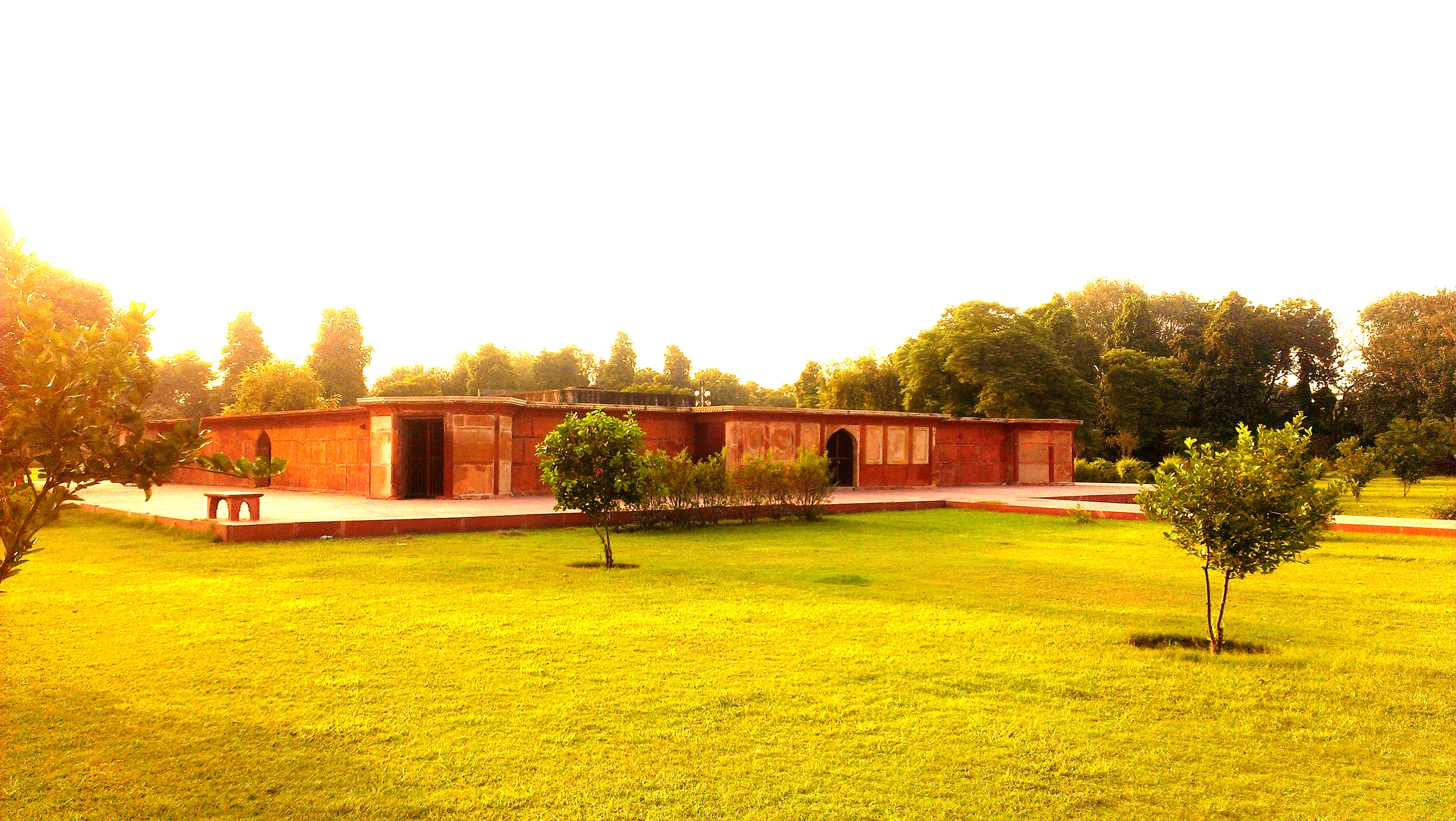
Mirza Najaf Khan's incomplete tomb, the commander-in-chief of the Mughal Army during the reign of Shah Alam II.

== Death ==
Najaf Khan died on April 26, 1782, after serving Mughal throne for forty two years.

He started to suffer long bouts of fever and illness immediately after he was appointed Vakil-i-Mutlaq, or regent, of Mughals in 1779 at the age of 42. Court rumors had started against the rise of this Shia courtier. Kahir-ud-Din Illahabadi wrote in Ibratnama that Najaf Khan became close to eunuch Latafat Ali Khan who regularly supplied Najaf Khan with wine and dancing girls. Najaf became obsessed with an experienced prostitute introduced by Latafat. Nafaj spent much of his time drinking with this prostitute, until he fell seriously sick, feverish and weak to the extent "it could no longer be cured or treated". In reality his time in sickness was spent in "pain and suffering, spitting blood".

Mirza Najaf Khan had an adopted son Saif-ud-Daula Nawab Najaf Quli Khan, a Rathore Rajput who had converted to Islam from Hinduism. After Mirza Quli's death, there was a dispute about his possessions as he left no child to inherit them. Mirza Quli's widow, a sister of Ghulam Kadir, requested emperor for her adopted son on Mirza's position of deputy wazir but this claim was rivaled by Mirza Shafi Khan who had a great army and considerable resources in the Mughal court, Mirza was also the closest of relatives to Najaf.

== Tomb of Mirza Najaf Khan ==
Mirza Najaf Khan's Tomb near Safdarjung Airport lies near to the Tomb of Safdarjung in the Lodi Gardens. It is an uncompleted tomb. Set in a lush modern landscaped garden, this tomb is inside an enclosed boundary. There is a beautifully ruined entrance to the tomb complex set at a distance from the base platform of the tomb. In the middle of the area enclosed by the boundary, lies a large and beautiful square red stone platform with another smaller platform on top with a flat roof and no dome. Inscription marked grave of Mirza Najaf Khan and his daughter, Fatima (died 1820 CE), are inside two marble cenotaphs.

== Gallery ==
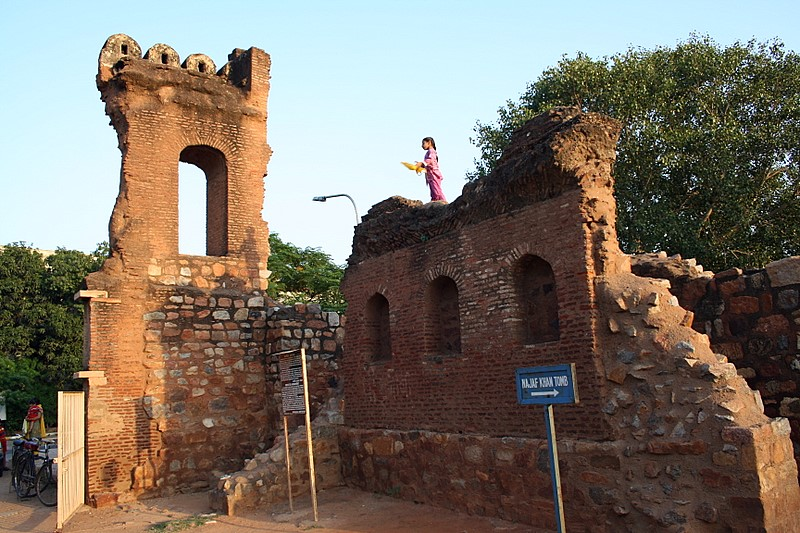
Mirza Najaf Khan's Tomb entrance

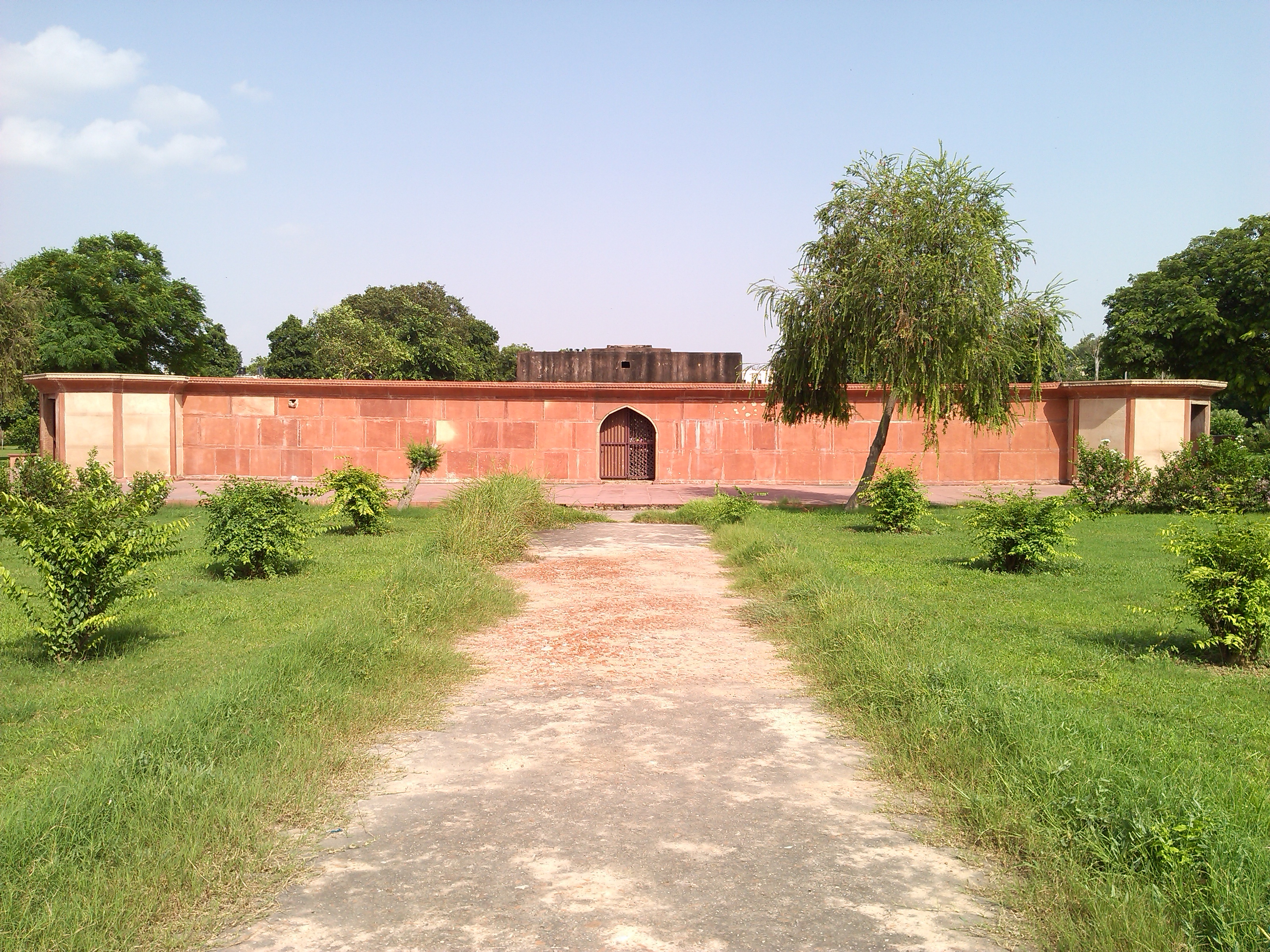
Mirza Najaf Khan tomb's enclosure wall

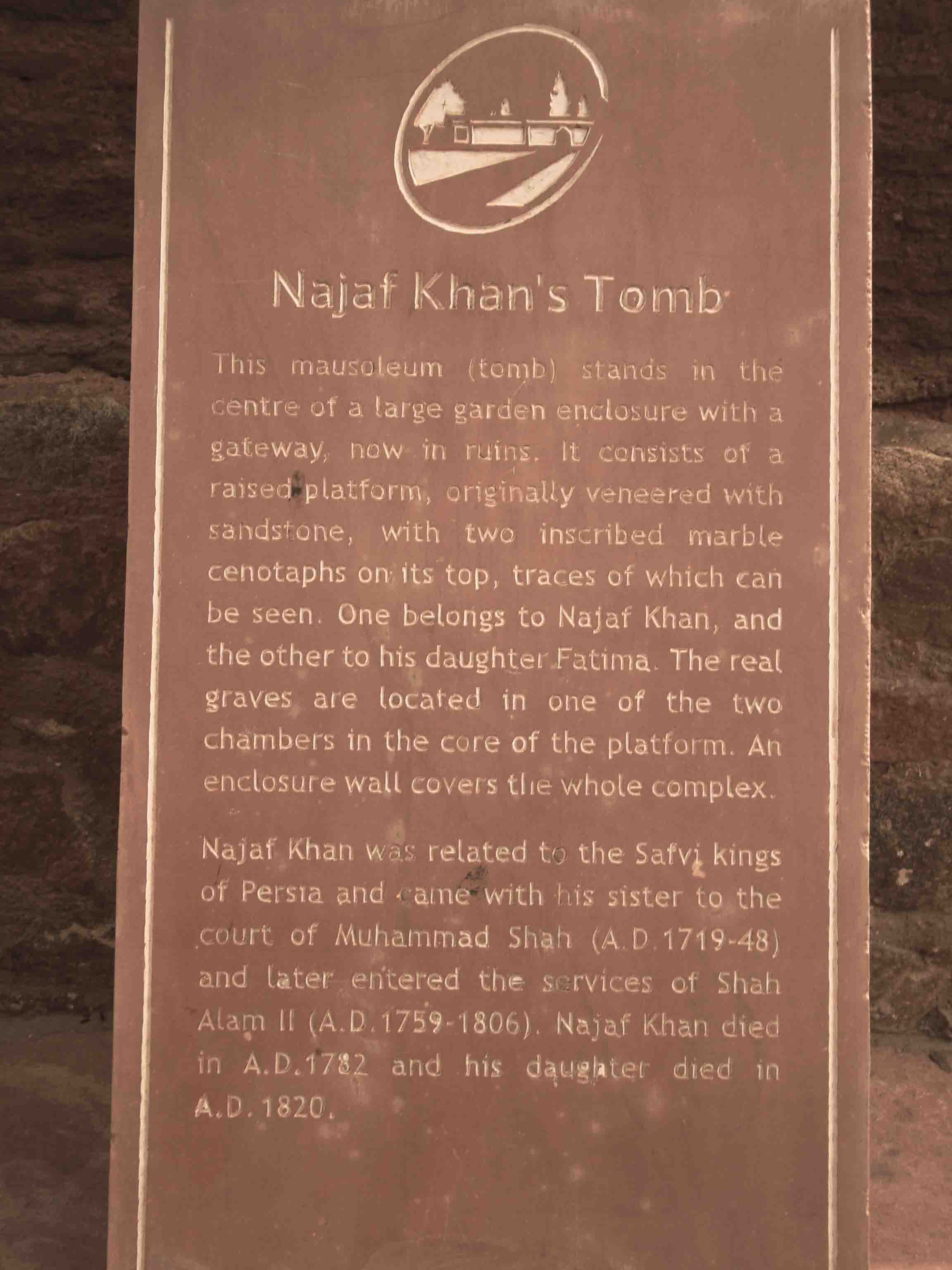
Mirza Najaf Khan's tomb

== See also ==
- Mirza Ismail Beg, kinsman
- Najafgarh town, Delhi, India.
