= Sikh attacks on Delhi =

Common in the second half of the 18th century

- Part of the Mughal–Sikh wars
Date	February 1764 – 12 March 1788
Location	Delhi, Mughal Empire
Result	Sikh victory: Plunder of Mughal, Rohilla and Rajput territories; Sikh hegemony over the Gangetic doab

Belligerents
Sikh Confederacy; Rohillas (from 1787); Co-belligirents; Jats of Bharatpur (1764-1765): Cis-Sutlej states; Patiala State (1779-1781); Jind (1775-1776); Supported by Mughal Nobles (1775-1788)	Mughal Empire; Rohillas (until 1787); Maratha Confederacy (1784-1788); Supported by Patiala State (1764-1768); Jind (1781)

Commanders and leaders
Leaders: Baghel Singh; Jassa Singh Ahluwalia Commanders Jassa Singh Ramgarhia Tara Singh Ghaiba (WIA); Charat Singh; Sahib Singh; Dyal Singh; Laja Singh; Rae Singh Bhangi; Karam Singh; Haqiqat Singh; Jai Singh; Ratan Singh †; Gurdit Singh; Zabita Khan(1775-1778); Ghulam Qadir (executed) (from 1787); Jawahar Singh (until 1765); Amar Singh (1779-1781); Raja Gajpat Singh; Gangaram; Bhawani Singh	Leaders: Shah Alam II (surrendered) Commanders Najib ad-Dawlah # Ghulam Qadir (until 1787); Zabita Khan # (1770-1775, 1778-1785); Zain Khan Sirhindi †; Prince Mirza Shikoh (surrendered); Najaf Khan # Rahimadad Khan †; Najaf Quli Khan; Abdul Ahad Khan; Afzal Khan; Nasir-ul-mulk; Daler Khan; Taza Beg Khan (executed); Sayyid Hasan Khan (executed); Mir Mansu †; Mirza Shafi Khan; Shah Nizam ud-din Gangaram (AWOL) (surrendered); Bhawani Singh (AWOL) (surrendered); Abu Qasim Khan †; Rahimdad Khan †; Dilawar Ali; Qalandhar Ali; Sheikh Haidar (WIA); Khalli Khan †; Begam Samru; Mir Baqar †; Mir Kallan †; Inayat Ali †; Murtaza Khan; Afrisiyab Khan; Fazal Ali Khan †; Mahadaji Sindhia; Madho Rao Phalke (surrendered); Rane Khan; Bagru Rao; Supported by Ala Singh; Amar Singh (until 1768); Bhoja Singh; Gajpat Singh (1781)

Sikh attacks on Delhi were a number of attacks and raids carried out by the Sikhs on the Mughal capital of Delhi in the second half of the 18th century. The Sikhs attacked Delhi 19 times between 1766 and 1788.

== Background ==
Sikhs were very scornful towards Delhi due to the following reasons.

- The Mughal Emperor Jahangir tortured Guru Arjan Dev to death.
- Guru Hargobind was imprisoned in the fort of Gwalior by Jahangir.
- Guru Tegh Bahadur was beheaded on the orders of Mughal Emperor Aurangzeb at Chandni Chowk.
- Guru Gobind Singh suffered a lot at the hands of Delhi. He lost his four sons, two in the Battle of Chamkaur and two were bricked alive by Wazir Khan (Sirhind).
- Banda Singh Bahadur was executed on the orders of Mughal Emperor Farrukhsiyar in Delhi.
- The Sikhs suffered massacres like Chota Ghalughara and other persecutions in Punjab under the Mughal rulers.

== Prelude ==
Following Ahmad Shah Durrani's retirement to Afghanistan after his Seventh Invasion in 1765, the Sikhs were left as the indisputable masters of eastern and central Punjab. They quickly exploited the power vacuum left by Abdali and began annual incursions and raids into territories held by Hindu or Muslim chiefs. Just a year prior, they had defeated the Mughal Faujdar, Zain Khan, in the climactic Battle in Sirhind in January of 1764, where Zain Khan Sirhindi was killed. The Sikhs would then seize the city and its surrounding areas, distributing the newly conquered territories amongst themselves and consolidating their power rapidly. The capture of Sirhind not only shattered the remnants of the Mughal power in Punjab but also provided the Sikh sardars a launching point for further raids into the rich areas of the Gangetic Doab.

== First Attack ==
After defeating the Mughals in the Battle of Sirhind (1764), the Sikhs would start their biannual raids into the Gangetic doab by February of 1764, where the Budha Dal under Jassa Singh Ahluwallia alongside other notable sardars, crossed the Satluj with a force numbering around 4,000-40,000 horsemen. The Sikhs immediately commenced by plundering nearby cities and villages such as Shamli, Kandah, Mirpur, Ambli, Deoband, Muzzafnagar, Jawalpur, Kankhal, Landaurah, Najibabad, Nagina, Moridabad, Chandausi, Anupshahr, Garkhmuketshar and notably, Saharanpur by February of 1764. During their attack, they had acquired an unnumerable amount of booty, devastated the country greatly and had taken away various captives to be sold for ransom.

At this time, Najib Ad-Dawlah, the then-dictator of Delhi, was concerned with other affairs, primarily regarding the Jats under their nascent leader, Jawahar Singh, who started to prepare for a future campaign against him. Najib was well-aware of Jawahar's intentions and tried to pacify him, being unsuccessful in doing so, much to his dismay.

Upon hearing of the Sikh invasion, Najib preferred to buy them off by paying a blackmail worth 11 lakhs worth of rupees to them, which the Sikhs would accept (due to the Taruna Dal marching on Lahore). The Sikhs would then hastily retire across the Satluj and return to the Punjab, leaving Najib's northern territories unmolested, but the Rohilla chief's pride was shattered. While not a complete success, the Sikhs plundered a considerable amount of money, and new raids would resume shortly after. According to Dr Ganda Singh, the Sikhs had been instigated to attack by the envoys of the Jat raja, Jawahar Singh, who brought to notice that "Najib had struck terror into their country".

== Second attack ==
=== Jat-Rohilla Contest near Delhi ===
Maharaja Suraj Mal, the greatest and most famous of the Jat rajas, was accidentally killed in a battle with Najib near the Yamuna on the 25th December, 1763. His son and successor, Jawahar Singh, as well as the entire Jat nation, harboured intense resentment towards Najib and vowed revenge on him for the death of their leader. The young Jawahar Singh made preparations for a punitive campaign to restore his nation's pride; however, he knew that by itself, he would not be able to overpower Najib lest he share a similar fate to his father. As a result, he hired 20,000 Maratha and up to 12,000-15,000 Sikh horsemen and also managed to enlist the help of the prominent Maratha Chief, Malhar Rao Holkar, for the upcoming campaign.

Najib Khan, meanwhile, was frightened by the young prince's movements and by foresight, he sought help from his ally and sponsor, Ahmad Shah, sending his envoy Meghraj to Kandhar in 1764. Najib then tried to pacify the raja, but ultimately to no avail, as Jawahar stuck to his resolution and by November of 1764, he marched to Delhi itself and besieged the Rohilla chief.

=== Second Invasion across the Yamuna (November-December 1764) ===
Taking advantage of Najib's precarious position, the Sikhs once more crossed the Yamuna at Buriya Ghat. They began attacking the districts of Saharanpur, Meerut and Bijnor, which were left vulnerable due to Najib's absence from the north. The Sikhs successfully plundered these areas and temporarily occupied them without much resistance. In their search for plunder, the Sikhs even penetrated remote villages located in the lower hills for it. While Najib Khan was besieged in Delhi, he had sent Hafiz Rahmat Khan with a force of 6,000 to resist the invaders; however, out of fear, he retreated to Delhi to aid Najib, leaving the locals at the mercy of the Sikhs.

=== Sikh-Jat alliance (1765) ===
Jawahar's Siege on Delhi was prolonged due to the lukewarm nature of his ally, Malharrao, who was more inclined towards Najib (due to him wanting to profit from both sides) and the faithlessness of the former wazir, Imad ul-Mulk. These men, alongside other prominent commanders within the Jat army, had secretly conspired in correspondence with Najib and sought to bring about the demise of Jawahar. Malhar Rao had previously restrained his troops from helping Jawahar during the first skirmishes in November of 1764 and remained a silent spectator, an ally only in name. Losing faith in his Maratha allies, Jawahar sought help from the main body of Sikhs under Jassa Singh Ahluwalia, who would arrive with a 12,000-15,000-strong army in January of the following year. Upon their arrival at Barari Ghat, the Raja crossed the Yamuna River and would interview them soon after. However, during these negotiations, differences would quickly arise with the Jat raja, as some of the raja's diplomats and huqqa bearers would be abused and mistreated by the Sikhs (due to his attendants carrying tobacco). The Sikhs also offered a prayer and uttered the following:

"O God, Jawahar Singh, son of Suraj Mal, follower of Guru Nanak, has taken shelter with the Khalsa and with your blessings, he seeks to avenge the death of his father."

Jawahar Singh, however, was unfamiliar with the Khalsa's customs and traditions and was unaware of the restrictions on tobacco in Sikhi, hence he felt displeased when his attendants would be barred from entrance by the Khalsa. His discomfort was clearly a result of his own ignorance, but due to the dire situation he was in, he decided not to make an issue out of it and bore all the insults silently.

At last, it was planned that the Khalsa would attack Delhi from the north via Sabzi Mandi and encamp north and west of the Jats, who would also be accompanied by the Marathas. The Sikh horsemen were to scour the country from north to west and to cut the provisions line, preventing Najib from gaining any supplies. The Sikhs would ride out every day and attempt to approach the walls of Delhi, being met by the Rohillas, who would fire at them from the cover of ruined houses. The battle became an exchange of musket fire at close range, ending in no clear victor and resulted in heavy casualties on both sides. However, the Sikhs possessed no artillery, and therefore, they could not assault the fort. Many sikhs who attempted to breach the walls were all shot down swiftly by Najib's men. Progress halted until 25th January 1765, when a major battle occurred between the Sikhs, aided by the Jats and Najib's men, on a hill near Sabzi Mandi, where the battle ended in an indecisive manner with great losses on both sides. Another major battle was fought on February 5, 1765, where the Rohilla army was routed and forced to retreat.

Additionally, there sparked rumours that Ahmad Shah Abdali was going to cross the Indus and come to his ally, Najib's rescue, which caused the Sikhs to withdraw a large portion of their armies towards Lahore. Eventually, Malhar Rao and Imad publicly joined Najib against Jawahar, who recognised his dire situation and inability to inflict a defeat on Najib, eventually deciding to retire to his own territory. The remaining Sikhs, upon hearing of Abdali's arrival in Lahore, "went off all at once" without asking for leave from the Jat raja.

== Third attack ==
Following the retreat of the Afghan troops from the Punjab in March 1765, the Sikhs would spend 6 months gathering harvests and consolidating their newfound power in the region until the end of the rainy season. In September of 1765, they would gather at Amritsar and decided to invade the estates of Najib Khan, Abdali's plenipotentiary and the Dictator of Delhi. They divided themselves into two bodies, marching past Sirhind. The Taruna Dal crossed the Yamuna at Barari Ghat, entering the district of Saharanpur, while the Budha Dal, consisting of 25,000 horsemen under Jassa Singh Ahluwalia, would attack the areas north of Delhi.

At this time, Najib, with an army of 10,000 horsemen, was busy subduing rebellious villages in the Bhiwani and Rohtak areas and had succeeded in imposing his authority in the areas near Narnual. Upon hearing of the Sikh invasion and their levying of blackmail across his domains, Najib advanced to meet them and handled the situation with such "skill and persistence" as was to be expected from one of the greatest generals of his time. Alongside him, the Raja of Bhatner and Amar Singh of Patiala, the grandson and successor of Alha Singh, joined the Ruhela sardar against the Sikhs. Meanwhile, the Sikhs had ravaged the country for plunder and partially to test Najib's capabilities. However, their depredations were short-lived as they retreated across the Satluj to Amritsar in early October of 1765 to celebrate Diwali.

=== Battle of Shamli (December 1765) ===
By December 1765, the Sikhs returned to the Gangetic doab after celebrating Diwali and resumed plundering Najib's territory. He had prepared in their absence and met to oppose them at Shamli, 20 kilometres (12 mi) east of Karnal.

Many skirmishes occurred between the sides throughout the battle. A bloody battle raged for the entire day and about four hours after nightfall, resulting in the death of several Rohilla chieftains. The Sikhs took shelter on sugarcane plantations and used their matchlocks to intermittently harass the Rohillas and retreat. This continued for three hours into the night until the Sikhs retired to their camp for rest. The following day, Najib marched purposefully towards the Sikhs. His right flank was under his brother, Sultan Khan; his left flank was under his son, Zabita Khan; the vanguard was under Karam Khan; and the rearguard was under his other brother, Afzal Khan. Najib was also accompanied by chief of artillery Zain Khan, who provided him with small guns. He could not advance much further because the Sikhs surrounded him, and fighting began an hour after dawn. The battle raged until noon, when a dry nullah prevented Najib's loaded carts from marching any further. The Sikhs ambushed Zabita Khan, clashing with him in a mango grove with heavy losses on both sides.

They hoped that by keeping the Rohillas engaged in combat, they would have time to cross the river. The Sikhs were attacked en route by Sadiq Khan, who was surrounded and relieved with difficulty by his brother Sa'dat Khan and Afzal Khan. Najib continued his advance despite heavy casualties. The battle raged until late in the afternoon, when they approached the Yamuna river where the Sikhs had moved their baggage. The Sikhs attacked the Rohilla rear, and Najib's men begged him to let them attack. Another battle followed. The Sikhs, seeing Najib's flag, emptied their matchlocks and were dispersed from the hill; at night, they retreated across the river with their supplies.

== Fourth attack ==
On 18 January 1774, the Sikhs invaded Delhi for the fourth time. They plundered Shahdara and the Mughal nobility.

== Fifth attack ==
In October 1774, the Sikhs attacked and ravaged Delhi.

== Sixth attack ==
In 1775, Sikh forces assembled near Karnal, forming three main divisions commanded by leaders Rae Singh Bhangi, Tara Singh Ghaiba, and Baghel Singh. On 22 April, they crossed the Yamuna River via Begi Ghat near Kunjpura. Zabita Khan, a local leader, hastily abandoned Garhi Duhtar and retreated to his fortified stronghold, Ghausgarh.

The Sikhs first confronted the Turkomans of Lakhnauti, followed by an assault on Gangoh, where they exacted a tribute of 60,000 rupees. Moving to Ambehta, they demanded 5,000 rupees but accepted 2,000 after negotiations. Nanauta suffered significant destruction, with parts of the town burned, and accounts describe civilians lamenting the loss of household goods. Deoband became the next target, where resistance led by Taza Beg Khan prompted a prolonged siege. After breaching the town via mining tactics, the Sikhs executed Khan with brutal methods, sparking fierce street battles with Afghan defenders that lasted two weeks. The town eventually surrendered, paying 12,000 rupees, with Rae Singh Bhangi imposing an annual levy of 600 rupees. A local tradition recounts the abduction of a young boy, Qalandar Bakhsh, later ransomed by his grandfather through diplomatic intervention.

Zabita Khan, recognising the futility of prolonged conflict, negotiated a truce by paying 50,000 rupees and forged an alliance with the Sikhs against Emperor Shah Alam II. The combined forces advanced toward Delhi, pillaging settlements like Miranpur, Kaithorah, Shamli, Kairana, Kandhla, and Meerut before recrossing the Yamuna at Kutana Ghat. By late April, reports highlighted Sikh disruptions near Delhi, compounded by Maratha threats, urging collaborative action from regional powers.

Raids persisted into July, with Sikh forces burning areas like Paharganj and Jaisinghpur, clashing with imperial troops. Zabita Khan pushed south to Khurja but faced defeat by Najaf Khan at Meerut, forcing a retreat. By 24 July, the Sikhs withdrew across the Yamuna near Sonepat and Panipat, concluding their campaign.

== Seventh attack ==
The seventh attack happened in November 1776. The prime minister of the Mughal empire, Najaf Khan, was taken by surprise.

== Eighth attack ==
The eighth raid happened in September 1778. Sahib Singh encamped near the Shalimar garden. The Mughals invited the Sikhs to a feast.

== Ninth attack ==
On 1 October 1778, which was Dushera day, the Sikhs attacked Delhi and all the way to Rakabganj. They destroyed a Mosque which was created on the site of a previously destroyed Gurdwara. The Sikhs remained in Delhi for one month after capture.

== Tenth attack ==
On 12 April 1781, after attacks by the Mughals on the Sikhs, the Sikhs marched toward Delhi. They sacked Baghpat and laid waste to Khekra. The Sikhs managed to intercept letters of Najaf Khan, and an alarm was raised in Delhi. On the 13th they stormed Sardhana and Mawana. They pillaged Muradnagar. Manu Lal, the vaki of Begam Samru, sought immediate aid. Najaf Khan ordered Afrasiyab Khan to march on the Sikhs, but they refused unless they were paid. Najaf had no money.

On the 16th, the Sikhs attacked Patparganj and Shahdara, which were the suburbs of Delhi. People over 50 miles South of Delhi were terrified. Other Sikh armies conquered Sheikhpura and Barnawa. The amil of the place was wounded and fled. On the 17th, Najaf Khan marched to Karinana to protect his own estate. Najaf Khan marched with many generals against the Sikhs as they continued to conquer the area around Delhi. Murtaza Khan and Gazi Khan had 4,100 troops ready to march against the Sikhs.

On the 20th, the Sikhs crossed the Yamuna back into their own territory and started selling looted property and goods. On the 24th, 500 more Sikhs crossed the river, with 300 of them carrying booty. A skirmish occurred when Mir Mansu attacked the Sikhs, eventually dying in battle.

== Eleventh attack ==
On 28 March 1782, Najaf Khan ordered Shafi to march against the Sikhs with an army of 10,000. Najaf Khan would die soon after giving the orders. Shafi attacked the Sikhs for two months before being summoned to Delhi and negotiating with the Sikhs. As September began and the rainy season ended, the Sikhs raided and looted everything from Delhi to Hardwar.

== Twelfth attack ==
Slab of Mughal throne placed in the Ramgarhia Bunga

In 1783, a body of 40,000 Sikhs camped at Delhi. Prince Mirza Shikoh was defeated and fled. The Sikh soldiers were divided into 3 groups. Two groups of 5,000 Sikhs each deployed at Majnu-ka-Tilla and Ajmeri Gate; whereas 30,000 Sikhs under Baghel Singh, Jassa Singh Ramgarhia and Jassa Singh Ahluwalia camped at a place known as Tees Hazari before attacking Red Fort. The Sikhs defeated the Mughals in the Battle of Delhi (1783) and captured Delhi. Jassa Singh Ahluwalia was placed on the takht of Delhi as Badshah Singh of Delhi but Jassa Singh Ramgarhia objected that without Dal Khalsa meeting no one can be placed on the throne, and instead enchained the throne and brought it back to the Ramgarhia Bunga, where it still sits today. Mughals agreed to construct 7 Sikh Gurudwaras in Delhi for Sikh Gurus. Mughal slab from Delhi was roped with horse and brought to Amritsar in Punjab.

=== Gurdwaras constructed by Baghel Singh in Delhi ===
- Gurdwara Mata Sundri
- Gurdwara Bangla Sahib
- Gurdwara Rakab Ganj
- Gurdwara Sis Ganj
- Gurdwara Majnu Ka Tilla

== Thirteenth attack ==
In December 1784, the Sikhs raided and plundered the neighbourhoods of Delhi on instigation of Najaf Quli Khan. The Sikh quickly retreated before any counterattack.

== Fourteenth attack ==
In January 1786, the Sikhs and Gujars raided the territory from Panipat to Delhi. Sikhs numbering nearly 5,000 had plundered villages near Ghausgarh. The Sikh further ravaged Meerut, Hapur, and Gharmuktesar. Ravjoli Sindha marched to the Sikhs with 7,000 cavalry and 10 cannons. The Sikhs marched back to their own territory.

== Fifteenth attack ==
On 27 July 1787, 500 Sikhs plundered everything from Agra to Delhi.

== Sixteenth attack ==
The sixteenth attack happened in August 1787. The Sikhs once more attacked Shahdara. The Sikhs fought with the imperial guards and defeated them. The Maratha General Madho Rao Phalke marched against the Sikhs and fought them. In the fight, many men drowned in the river, with a large number being killed or wounded. Shah Nizum-ud-Din and Deshmukh watched the violence and decided to join in. They attacked the Sikhs with many bullets but retreated later on. Phalke surrendered while the rest of the generals fled.

== Seventeenth attack ==
The Sikh with Ghaulam Qadir attacked the Red Fort on 30 October 1787.

== Eighteenth attack ==
In early 1788, Ghulam Qadir's territory was unprotected. The Sikhs attacked the territory, which included Delhi.

== Nineteenth attack ==
On the night of 12 March 1788, the Sikhs with Najaf Quli Khan attacked the tent of Mughal Emperor Shah Alam II and slaughtered his men. The emperor managed to save himself by fleeing to a heavily guarded tent.

== Legacy ==
In 2014, Baghel Singh's conquest of Delhi was commemorated at the Fateh Diwas public event at the Red Fort. The Sikh attacks on Delhi, namely the conquest under Baghel Singh, were popularly recalled during the 2020–21 Indian farmers' protest and in early 2024, exemplified by the slogans Dilli Fateh ("conquest of Delhi") and Dilli Chalo ("march onto Delhi").

== See also ==
- Decline of the Mughal Empire
- Maratha capture of Mughals
- Maratha conquest of North-west India
