= Battle of Delhi (1783) =

Sikh raid on Delhi during the fall of the Mughal Empire

Battle of Delhi 1783
- Part of Mughal-Sikh Wars and Sikh attacks on Delhi
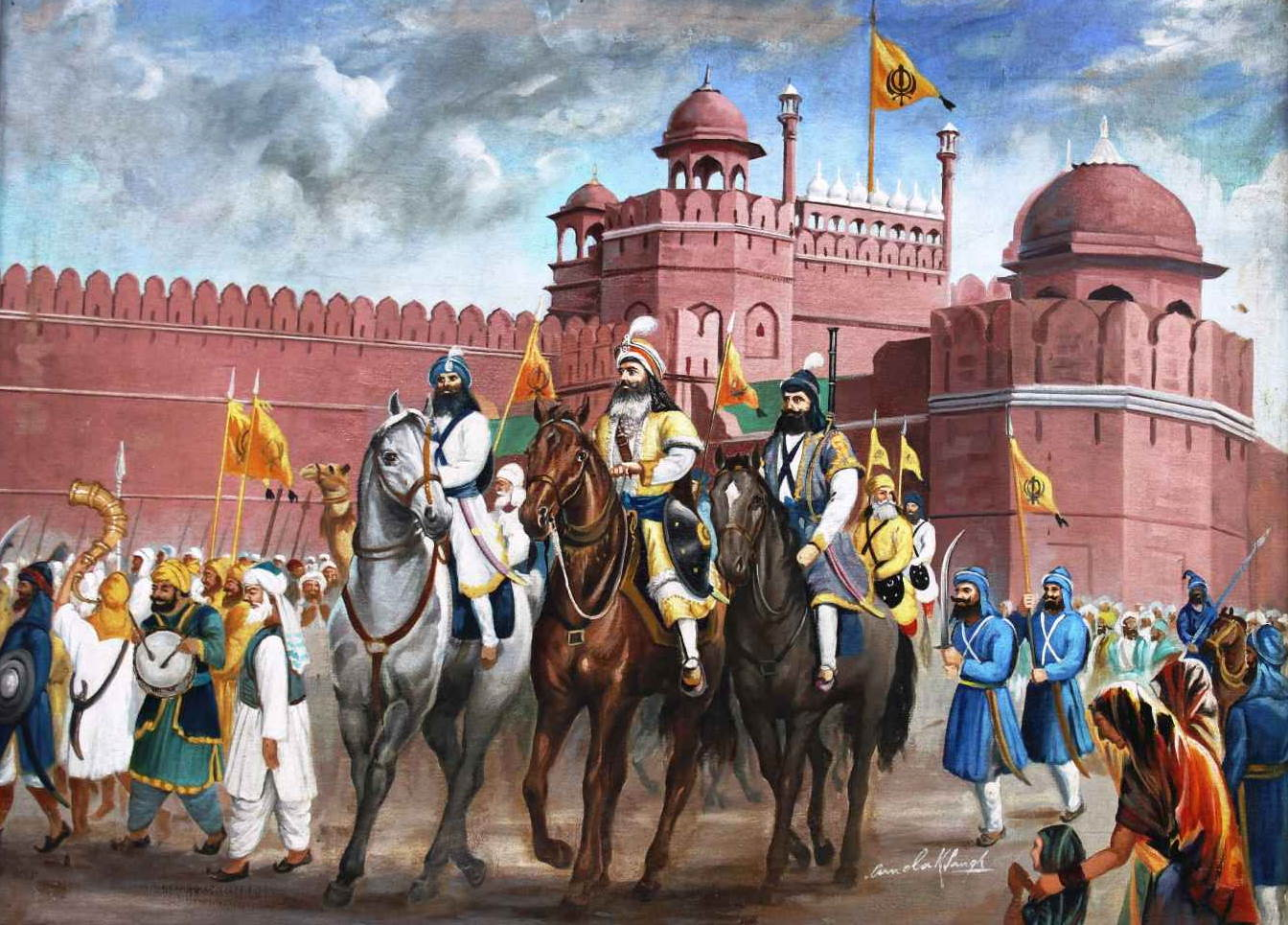
- Baghel Singh, Jassa Singh Ahluwalia, and Jassa Singh Ramgharia marching through Delhi next to the Red fort.
Date	11 March 1783
Location	Delhi
Result	Sikh victory.: Construction of Gurudwara Bangla Sahib, Gurudwara Sis Ganj Sahib; Shah Alam II surrenders to the Sikhs.; Jassa Singh Ahluwalia is temporarily enthroned on the throne of Delhi as "Badshah Singh of Delhi."; The throne of Aurangzeb is taken back to Amritsar by Jassa Singh Ramgarhia
Territorial changes	The Sikhs temporarily conquer Delhi

Belligerents
Dal Khalsa (Sikhs)	Mughal Sultanate

Commanders and leaders
Baghel Singh; Jassa Singh Ahluwalia; Jassa Singh Ramgarhia	Shah Alam II (surrendered); Mirza Shikoh (surrendered)

Strength
30,000	Unknown

Casualties and losses
Unknown	Unknown

The Battle of Delhi was fought between the Dal Khalsa of Sikhs and the Mughal Empire in 1783.

== Background and battle ==
The Sikhs under Baghel Singh, Jassa Singh Ahluwalia, and Jassa Singh Ramgarhia, began raiding and plundering the outskirts of Delhi in 1764. In April 1782, Najaf Khan hitherto the highest commander of the Mughal army died, after which a power struggle ensued allowing the Sikhs to capture Delhi. The Sikhs reappeared in Delhi and plundered its environs and laid waste the country up to Khujra. Some of the Sikhs having ravaged the Gangetic Doab contemplated approaching Ruhilkhand, though they were deterred by the arrival of the Nawab of Oudh's forces as well as some English battalions to the area, forcing them to concentrate solely on the Doab. Some of the rajas reigning over areas dominated by the Sikhs agreed to pay tribute to them. The main body of the Sikhs having plundered Aligarh and Buland Shahar proceeded towards Delhi where they further set Malka Ganj and Sabzi Mandi on fire. They managed to capture the Red Fort on 11 March after defeating a defence by Prince Mirza Shikoh.

== Dispute over throne ==
Jassa Singh Ahluwalia was placed on the throne of Delhi as Badshah Singh of Delhi but Ramgarhia objected that no one can sit on the throne without the approval of Sarbat Khalsa.

== Settlement ==
A settlement was agreed upon between the Sikhs and the Delhi court which entailed a cash present of three lakh rupees and Baghel Singh staying behind at the head of 4,000 Sikh troops to oversee the construction of gurdwaras in the city. The main body of Sikhs left Delhi on 12 March 1783 following the settlement.

== Aftermath ==
Slab of Mughal throne placed in Ramgarhia Bunga

Sardar Jassa Singh Ramgarhia captured the Red Fort of Delhi in conjunction with Sardar Baghel Singh. He detached the throne of Mughal Emperor Aurangzeb (on which he likely ordered the death of the 9th Sikh guru Guru Tegh Bahadur) and brought it on elephants and kept it at Golden Temple, Amritsar. Even today it is present at the Golden Temple, in the Ramgarhia Bunga minaret.

== See also ==
- Sikh raids on Delhi

== Sources ==
- Singha, H. S, ed. (2000). The Encyclopedia of Sikhism. Hemkunt Press. ISBN 978-81-7010-301-1.
