= Baghel Singh =

Sikh leader of the Singh Krora Misl

Sardar Baba Baghel Singh
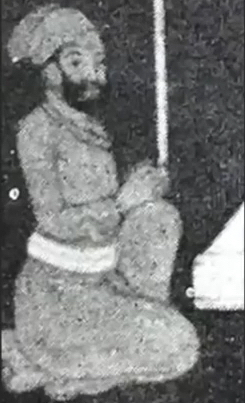
- Baghel Singh depicted in a Janamsakhi manuscript commissioned by him, circa 1793

Jathedar of Takht Sri Damdama Sahib
- Appointed by: Sarbat Khalsa
- Preceded by: Bhagwan Singh
- Succeeded by: Diwan Singh

Sardar of Singh Krora Misl
- In office 1761–1802
- Preceded by: Karora Singh
- Succeeded by: Jodh Singh

Personal details
- Born: c. 1730s Chabhal Kalan, Punjab, Mughal Empire (present-day Tarn Taran district, Punjab, India)
- Died: c. 1800s Hariana, Singh Krora Misl, Sikh Confederacy (present-day Hoshiarpur district, Punjab, India)
- Resting place: 1765 - 1802; Punjab
- Spouses: Bibi Ram Kaur; Bibi Roop Kaur; Bibi Rattan Kaur
- Children: Bahadur Singh

Military service
- Battles/wars: Mughal-Sikh Wars; Sikh raids on Delhi; Battle of Delhi (1764); Fourth Battle of Panipat; Siege of Kunjpura (1772); Battle of Ghanaur; Capture of Delhi and Red fort (1783); Siege of Patiala (1779); Resistance in opposition to Mughal dominion; Afghan-Sikh Wars; Battle of Kup; Battle of Pipli Sahib; Battle of Sirhind (1764); Battle of Mahilpur (1757)
- Commander: Dal Khalsa

Baghel Singh (c. 1730s – c. 1800s) was a Sikh warrior and leader in the Punjab region in the northern part of the Indian subcontinent in the 18th century. He rose to prominence in the area around Sutlej and Yamuna. He joined the Singh Krora Misl, one of the Misls during Sikh Confederacy. In 1765, Singh became the leader of the Misl. Baghel Singh is remembered for constructing important Sikh Gurdwaras in Delhi at the sites of important events in Sikh history in the area.

== Early life ==
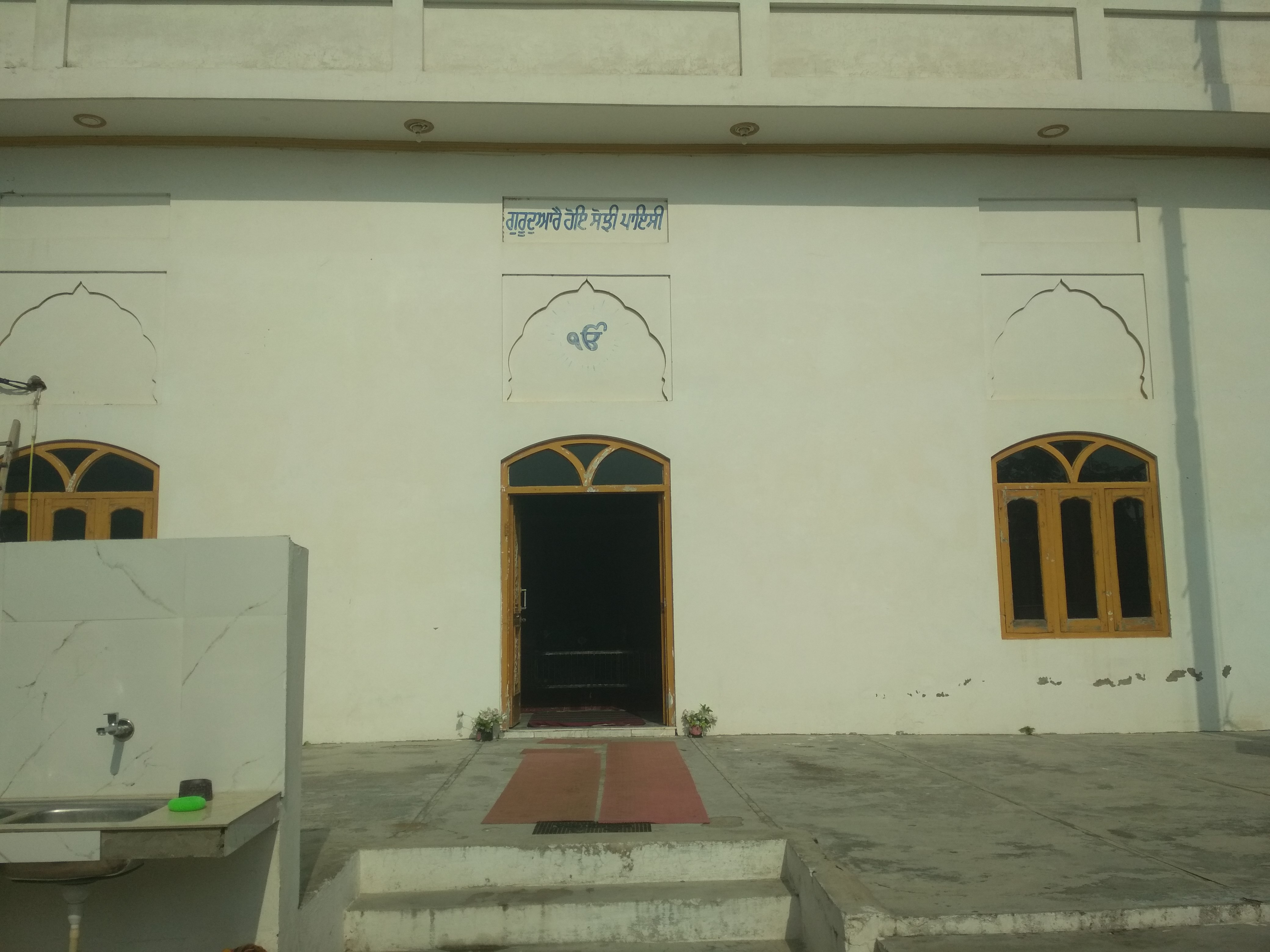
Gurdwara Baghel Singh

Baghel Singh was born in village Chabhal Kalan, Tarn Taran district of Punjab around 1730s into a Dhaliwal Jat family. After the death of Karora Singh, Baghel Singh succeeded him to the headship of the Misl.

== Military career ==
Following Adina Beg Khan's death in September 1758, and during Ahmad Shah Durrani's invasion of the Marathas (1759-1761), Sikh sardars expanded their territories, establishing themselves as regional chieftains. Baghel Singh acquired a significant portion of Hoshiarpur district and nearly one-fourth of the Jalandhar Doab. He established his primary headquarters in Hariana, 12 kilometers west of Hoshiarpur, and entrusted administrative responsibilities to his wife, Rup Kanwar, who governed effectively.

After the partition of the Sarhind province in January 1764, Baghel Singh expanded his territories to include Chhalondi, Jamaitgarh, Khurdin, and Kinori. He established a secondary headquarters in Chhalondi, 30 kilometers from Karnal on the Jagadhri road, with his second wife, Ram Kanwar, overseeing administration. His third wife, Ratan Kaur, managed Kalawar. While his wives handled regional governance, Baghel Singh focused on external affairs and military campaigns.

=== In Ganga Doab ===
Following the conquest of Sirhind province, the Taruna Dal returned to West Punjab, while the Budha Dal, a formidable force of 40,000, marched into the upper Ganga Doab under the leadership of Jassa Singh Ahluwalia and Baghel Singh Dhaliwal. In February 1764, they sacked the town of Saharanpur and ravaged the districts of Saharanpur, Muzaffarnagar, and Meerut.

The Sikhs then crossed the Ganga River into Rohilkhand, plundering key towns such as Najibabad, Moradabad, and Anupshahar within a span of two months. Najib ad-Dawlah, the de facto ruler of Delhi from 1761 to 1770, was unable to resist the Sikh onslaught. Opting for pragmatism, he chose to pay a substantial ransom of eleven lakhs of rupees to the Sikhs, thereby safeguarding his estates.

In 1775, the Sikhs congregated near Karnal, forming three divisions under the leadership of Rae Singh Bhangi, Tara Singh Ghaiba and Baghel Singh. On April 22, 1775, they crossed the Yamuna River near Kunjpura, embarking on a campaign that would see them capture several key towns and villages. Their conquests included Lakhnauti, Gangoh, Ambehta, Nanauta, and Deoband, which fell with little resistance. Zabita Khan, the ruler of Ghausgarh, managed to spare his capital by offering flattery and a bribe of 50,000 rupees, but was forced to accompany the Sikhs as they continued their campaign. The Sikhs also exacted tributes from the Barah Sadat villages, as well as Shamli, Kairana, Kandhla, and Meerut. They advanced as far as Khurja before beginning their return journey, during which they destroyed Paharganj and Jaisinghpura in Delhi on July 15, 1775. Finally, they recrossed the Jamuna River in July 1775, returning home after a successful campaign.

On March 11, 1776, a significant Sikh military force, led by prominent leaders including Baghel Singh, launched an assault on the Meerut district. During the ensuing battle at Amrinagar, Abu'l Qasim, the imperial commander and brother of Deputy Prime Minister Abdul Ahad Khan, lost his life while fighting against the Sikh forces.

In 1779, Abdul Ahad Khan, the Mughal Empire's deputy prime minister, led an expedition against the Cis-Satluj Sikhs to collect tribute. He departed Delhi on June 18 with Emperor Shah Alam's second son, Prince Mirza Jahln, and Sial Farkhundah Bakht. When they arrived at Karnal, several Sikh chiefs, including Baghel Singh, met with the Nawab.

Baghel Singh had a long-standing grudge against Gajpat Singh of Jind, so he advised the Nawab to demand a hefty tribute from the Raja and imprison him if payment was delayed. To avoid imprisonment, Gajpat Singh agreed to pay 200,000 rupees. This amount secured his freedom, showcasing the complex power dynamics at play during this time.

In 1779, Baghel Singh influenced Nawab Abdul Ahad Khan to demand a substantial tribute from Dasu Singh, the ruler of Kaithal. On September 9, Abdul Ahad dispatched Baghel Singh and others to escort Dasu Singh from Kaithal to his camp in Thanesar. Dasu Singh requested the restoration of his territories, seized by Raja Amar Singh of Patiala. Abdul Ahad insisted on a three-lakh tribute, but Dasu Singh offered only two lakhs, leading to his imprisonment along with eight companions Dasu Singh was released after paying four lakhs of rupees. As a mediator, Baghel Singh and other Sikh chiefs received one-fourth of this amount.

On September 26, 1779, Abdul Ahad, at Ghuram, struggled to get Raja Amar Singh's compliance despite multiple summons. He consulted Baghel Singh, tasking him to bring Amar Singh to his camp on September 29. However, Amar Singh sought help from Majha Sikhs, prompting Baghel Singh to warn Abdul Ahad of impending danger. To ensure safety, Baghel Singh suggested bribing Trans-Satluj Sikh chiefs and escaping to Delhi. Abdul Ahad gave Baghel Singh three lakhs of rupees, recently collected from Desu Singh. Baghel Singh distributed most of it to Majha sardars, keeping some for himself. Abdul Ahad retreated on October 14, reaching Panipat on October 18. Nawab Abdul Ahad was frequently attacked by the Cis-Satluj Sikhs already present in his camp, and most of his luggage and equipment were plundered by them. Baghel Singh did not join in the loot, as he had already secured the lion's share.

=== Dispute with Raja Amar Singh ===
In 1780, Raja Amar Singh of Patiala took advantage of the infighting among Sikh chiefs and seized several villages belonging to Cis-Satluj Sikh leaders, including Baghel Singh, who lost Bhuni, Lalru, and Mullanpur. This move sparked a retaliation from Baghel Singh and other Sikh sardars.

As tensions escalated, Amar Singh formed alliances with additional sardars and the Raja of Nahan. The conflict culminated in a battle at Ghuram, just 25 kilometers south of Patiala. However, the outcome was indecisive, leaving both sides seeking new strategies. Baghel Singh launched a bold attack on Patiala city, but was repelled by the fortress's defenses. Undeterred, he shifted focus to the countryside, laying waste to Amar Singh's territories. Faced with this renewed pressure, Amar Singh opted for peace talks. his vakil, Chain Singh, intervened, grasping the horse's reins and appealing, "Singh Ji, spare a servant of the Guru's house." Moved, Baghel Singh welcomed Raja Amar Singh to his Lahal village camp. In a prearranged gesture, Amar Singh's five-year-old son, Sahib Singh, saluted Baghel Singh, who warmly took the child onto his lap. At Amar Singh's request, Baghel Singh baptized Sahib Singh, becoming his protector and cementing a sacred bond that transcended past conflicts.

=== Expedition to Farrukhabad ===
In February 1783, the 60,000-strong Budha Dal, led by Jassa Singh Ahluwalia and Baghel Singh, advanced on Delhi amidst the severe Chalisa famine ravaging northern India. They initiated their campaign of plunder in Ghaziabad, 20 kilometers south of Delhi, thoroughly ravaging the area. Next, they attacked Bulandshahr, 50 kilometers from Delhi, and subsequently sacked Khurja, a prominent market for grain and ghi, 33 kilometers farther south. Upon entering the town, the Sikhs prompted widespread panic, causing residents to flee in terror. The Sikh forces then apprehended wealthy locals, securing them to pillars and employing coercive methods to reveal the locations of their concealed treasures. Following the thorough plunder of the town, Baghel Singh and Jassa Singh initiated a unique gesture of devotion. Unfurling a cloth, they appealed to their fellow chiefs to contribute one-tenth of their spoils in cash as an offering to their revered Guru. This collective gesture yielded a substantial sum of one lakh (100,000) rupees. The accumulated funds were subsequently dedicated to the enhancement of the sacred Sri Harmandir Sahib in Amritsar. The Sikh forces, led by Baghel Singh, continued their relentless march southward, leaving a trail of plunder in their wake. They swept through Aligarh, 126 kilometers from Delhi, Hathras at 156 kilometers, Tundla at 204 kilometers, and Shikohabad at 241 kilometers, claiming riches from each town. Their next conquest was Farrukhabad, merely 107 kilometers from Shikohabad, which fell swiftly to the Sikh forces. The Nawab's palace was ravaged, yielding an astonishing haul: gold, precious ornaments, diamonds, pearls, the Nawab's golden huqqa, and a diamond-studded stick, all of which fell into Baghel Singh's hands.

=== Battle of Delhi ===
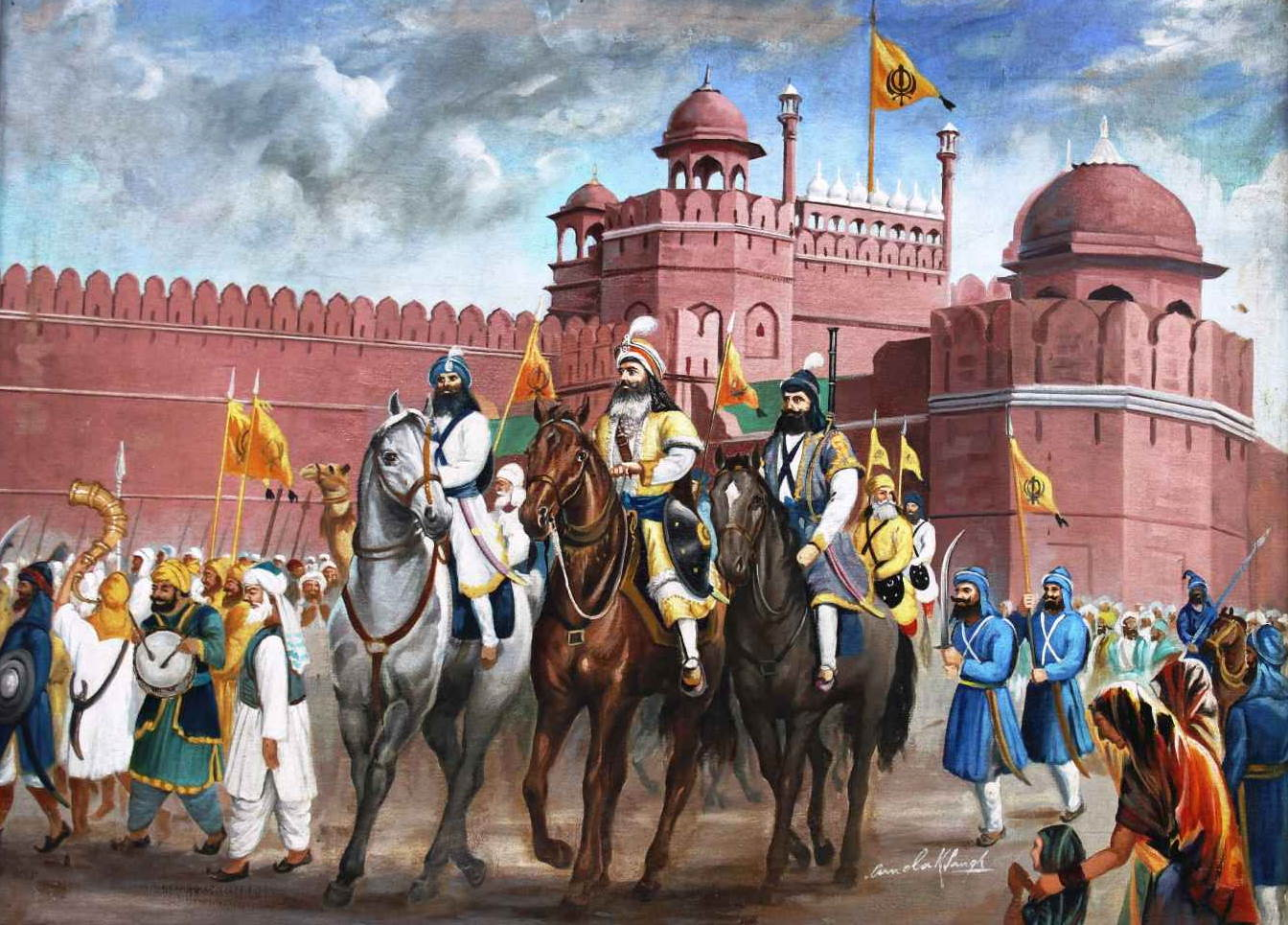
Baghel Singh, Jassa Singh Ahluwalia, and Jassa Singh Ramgharia marching through Delhi next to the Red fort.

The Sikh forces, led by Baghel Singh and Jassa Singh Ahluwalia, returned to Delhi on March 8, 1783, after their successful expedition from Farrukhabad. Upon arrival, they divided their massive army of 50,000 men into two groups, with Baghel Singh commanding 30,000 troops. These forces encamped at Tis Hazari and swiftly launched a series of plundering raids on Maika Ganj, Sabzi Mandi, and Mughalpura. The following day, March 9, 1783, the Sikhs continued their conquest, attacking Pahari Dhiraj and killing Rao Dhiraj Ram's son in the battle. Meanwhile, Jassa Singh Ahluwalia broke through Ajmeri Gate and ravaged Hauz Qazi, forcing the inhabitants to seek refuge in the Red Fort. The Emperor, desperate for assistance, called upon Begum Samru from Sardhana in the Meerut district. Jassa Singh Ramgarhia arrived in Delhi from Hisar with 10,000 troops in 1783, right as the Sikhs were wrapping up their conquest of the walled city and its suburbs. Having been driven out of Punjab by Jassa Singh Ahluwalia and others, Ramgarhia's timely arrival would prove pivotal, The Sikhs then turned their attention to the Red Fort, seeking to seize the property of refugees who had taken shelter there. They halted before Diwan-e-Am, where Ahluwalia's 20,000-strong force sought to install their leader on the throne. In a symbolic gesture, Ahluwalia was seated on the throne and proclaimed "Badshah Singh." However, Ramgarhia's arrival on the scene quickly complicated matters. He demanded Ahluwalia's immediate withdrawal from Diwan-e-Am, and tensions escalated as both sides drew their swords ¹. Ahluwalia wisely chose to defuse the situation, vacating the throne and ordering his men to exit the fort. The rival factions retreated to their respective camps, averting a potentially disastrous conflict.Begam Samru, entrusted by the Emperor to negotiate with the Sikhs, met with Baghel Singh at his Tis Hazari camp on March 12, 1783. Jassa Singh Ahluwalia declined to represent the Budha Dal, delegating authority to Baghel Singh, who was jointly authorized by both Jassa Singh's. The terms agreed upon between Begam Samru and Baghel Singh, subsequently approved by the Emperor, included the Dal Khalsa's withdrawal from Delhi, maintaining a 4,000-strong garrison under Baghel Singh, collecting taxes and octroi duties, responsible Sikh conduct, and permission to construct seven Gurdwaras at sacred Sikh sites within a year. This historic agreement marked a significant milestone in Sikh history, paving the way for iconic Gurdwaras in Delhi, such as Sis Ganj, Rakabganj, and Bangla Sahib.

=== Gurdwaras constructed in Delhi (1783) ===
After the occupation of Delhi in 1783 by Sikh forces under the command of Baghel Singh, the Sikhs stayed for a period of time to construct shrines at the sites of important events in Sikh history, such as the spot where the ninth Sikh guru, Guru Tegh Bahadur, was executed. First, the actual locations that events occurred at had to be identified, then the Sikhs erected edifices to commemorate the event. A force of around 4,000 Sikhs stayed in Delhi to assist Baghel Singh with the raising of the gurdwaras, with ten gurdwaras being built in-total.

Prominent gurdwaras originally constructed by Baghel Singh include the following:

- Gurdwara Mata Sundri
- Gurdwara Bangla Sahib
- Gurdwara Rakab Ganj
- Gurdwara Sis Ganj
- Gurdwara Majnu Ka Tilla
Original structures of gurdwaras constructed in Delhi by Baghel Singh

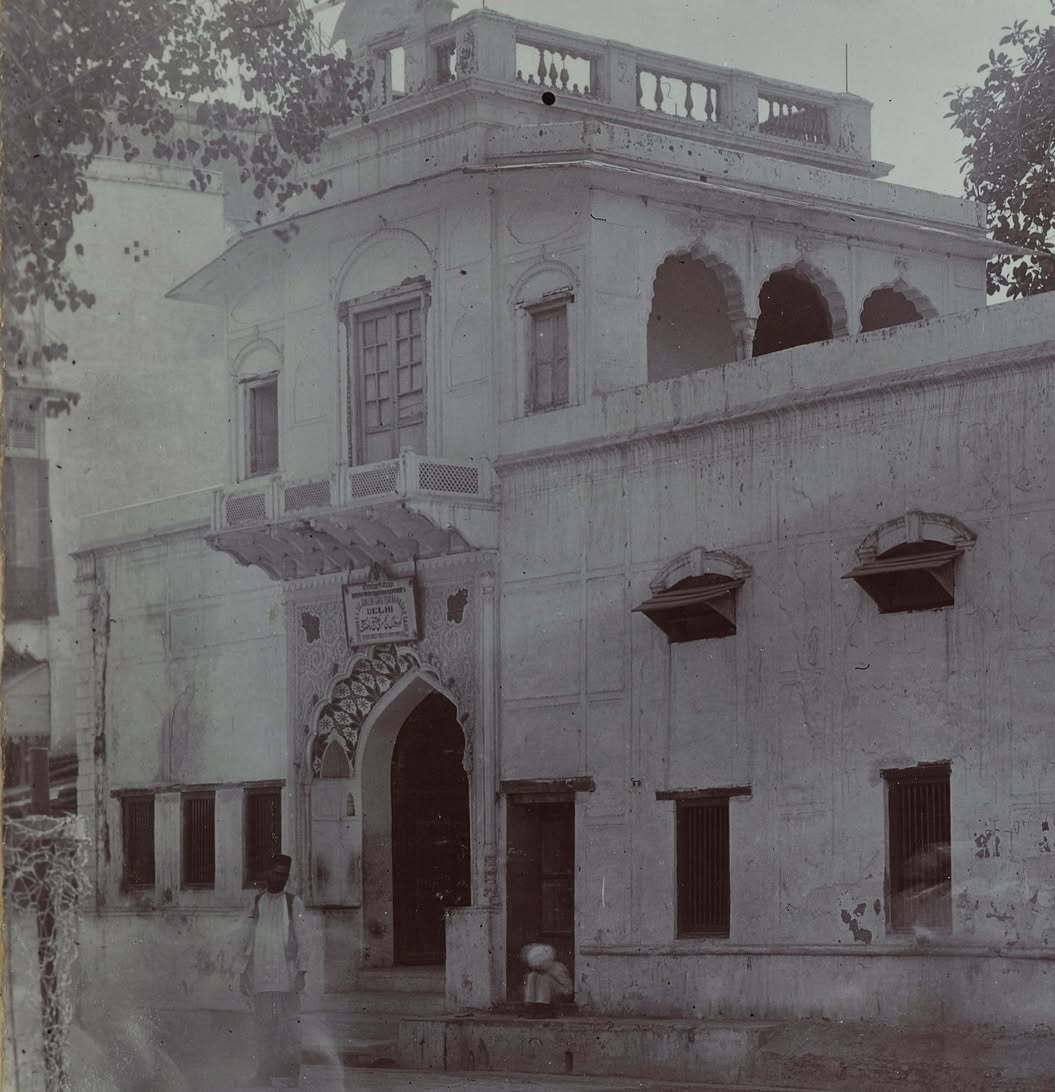
Photograph of the original structure of Gurdwara Sis Ganj Sahib, Chandni Chowk, Delhi, ca.1913–16

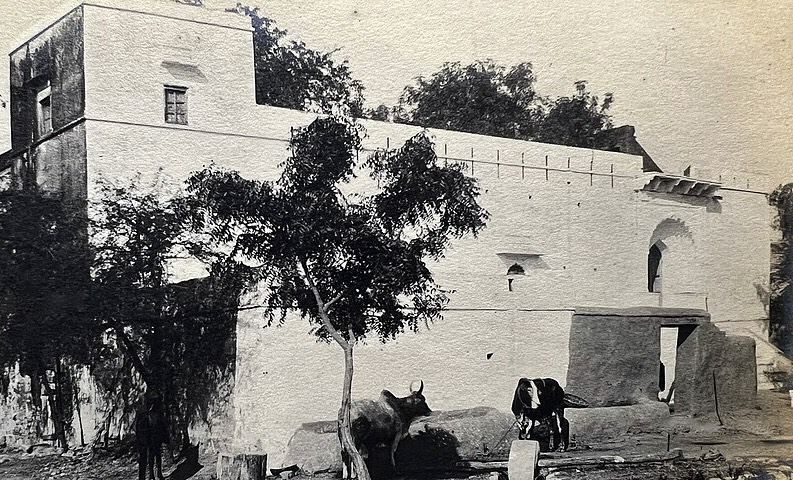
Photograph of the original structure of Gurdwara Rakab Ganj Sahib, Delhi, ca.1924–25

=== Treaty with Mahadaji Sindhia (1785) ===
Mahadaji Shinde, the Regent of the Mughal Empire appointed by Emperor Shah Alam II, sought to put an end to Sikh raids in the Ganga Doab and Delhi regions. To achieve this, his agent Ambaji Ingle forged a treaty with Baghel Singh and other prominent Sikh sardars on March 30, 1785. The treaty, ratified by Sindhia on May 9, 1785, stipulated that the Sikhs would refrain from exacting levies on crown lands, while the Marathas would provide them with one-third of the revenues from their affiliated territories. However, the Sikhs failed to uphold their end of the agreement and continued their raids unabated. In response, Ingle launched an expedition into the Cis-Satluj region in June 1787. Interestingly, Baghel Singh, who had received parganahas worth four lakhs annually, joined forces with Ingle. During this time, Mahadji was engaged in a war against Jaipur. An agent of the Raja of Jaipur approached Baghel Singh at Thanesar with an offer of money, which Baghel Singh accepted, persuading Ingle to retreat and even escorting him on his return journey.

=== Sack of Chandausi ===
In beginning of January 1785, Jassa Singh Ramgarhia, Baghel Singh, Gurdit Singh of Ladwa passed over Jamuna river, They plundered the village and towns of Sadaat-e-Bara, Zabita Khan did not stir out of his fort of Ghausgarh, they crossed the Ganga river and entered Rohilakhand, On 13 January, the villages of Barsi and mahmudpur were laid waste, On 14 January, They sacked Chandausi the great center of about 2000 bankers, rich merchants and jewellers was thoroughly squeezed and booty worth a crore of rupees was obtained in two days and nights.

=== Shah Alam II's appeal to Baghel Singh (1787) ===
Emperor Shah Alam II's pleas for help from Baghel Singh in 1787 ultimately proved futile. Despite the emperor's faith in Baghel Singh, the Sikh leader not only failed to provide aid but also joined forces with Ghulam Kadir, who was attacking Delhi. Ghulam Kadir's assault on Delhi was particularly brutal, with his forces occupying the city from July 18 to October 2, 1788.

In August 1787, Ghulam Kadir attacked Delhi, joined by several Sikh chiefs. Emperor Shah Alam II wrote to Baghel Singh for help on August 25, 30, and 31. Normal, Baghel Singh's representative at the Mughal court, secured a royal rescript on September 1, authorizing Baghel Singh to capture Ghulam Kadir's territories. However, Baghel Singh had no scruples about deserting the emperor's side and joined Ghulam Kadir instead.

Ghulam Kadir's occupation of Delhi was marked by atrocities committed against the royal family. On August 10, 1788, he blinded Emperor Shah Alam II, threw him to the ground, and sat on his breast. The princes and princesses were kept standing in the sun and tortured, while ladies were stripped naked and raped. Only Bhanga Singh of Thanesar, a Sikh leader, stood by the emperor, collaborating with Begam Samru, who remained loyal to Shah Alam II. Ghulam Kadir's reign of terror eventually ended when Mahadaji Shinde led a Maratha force to liberate Delhi. Ghulam Qadir was captured and executed on March 3, 1789.

=== Maratha Campaign ===
In 1788, Mahadaji Shinde dispatched Rane Khan and Ali Bahadur to collect tribute from Sikh chiefs. The duo was joined by Baghel Singh at Batra village near Karnal. This alliance marked the beginning of Baghel Singh's collaboration with the Marathas. To solidify their partnership, Mahadji granted Baghel Singh a large jagir in April 1789. This strategic move aimed to prevent Baghel Singh's associate Sikh chiefs from plundering imperial territories and maintain amity with the Marathas. Later in 1789, Dhar Rao led an expedition into the Cis-Satluj region, with Baghel Singh joining forces. The Maratha sardar targeted Patiala, where Diwan Nanun Mal promised two lakhs of rupees for recovering territory seized by neighboring chiefs. Successful in their endeavor, they reclaimed territory from Kaithal and Jalandhar chiefs, with Baghel Singh receiving compensation from both sides. In 1794, Anta Rao and Lachhman Rao launched a campaign, with Baghel Singh serving as their guide. The chiefs of Jind, Kaithal, Thanesar, and Radaur submitted, leading the Maratha forces to advance on Patiala. Tara Singh Ghaiba from the Trans-Satluj area came to Patiala's aid, culminating in the Battle of Murdanpur near Ambala. The Mamthas were forced to retreat to Kamal.

=== George Thomas and Perron in 1797 ===
George Thomas, an Irish adventurer, made a name for himself in India in 1797 by commanding a formidable force of eight regiments of infantry, one thousand horsemen, and fifty guns. He declared himself the Raja of Haryana, setting up base in Hansi, which understandably made the Sikhs quite nervous.

Meanwhile, Pierre Cuillier-Perron, a French general, was working for Daulat Rao Sindhia and successfully captured Delhi. In a surprising turn of events, Baghel Singh and other Sikhs from the Sarhind province joined forces with Perron to take down George Thomas. This alliance ultimately led to Thomas's defeat and expulsion. His army consisted of eight battalions of infantry, fifty pieces of cannon, and one thousand cavalrymen. Despite his impressive military presence, Thomas was eventually driven out by the Sikhs in 1801.

== Death ==
Baghel Singh's death date is a topic of debate among historians. Raghubir Verma claims he died in 1800 at Amritsar, while Gian Singh agrees with the 1802 timeline. Interestingly, Sir Lepel Griffin states that Baghel Singh joined the British army with Bhag Singh of Jind in January 1805, which raises questions about his actual death date. Considering this, it's possible Baghel Singh died either at the end of 1805 or beginning of 1806.

== Legacy ==
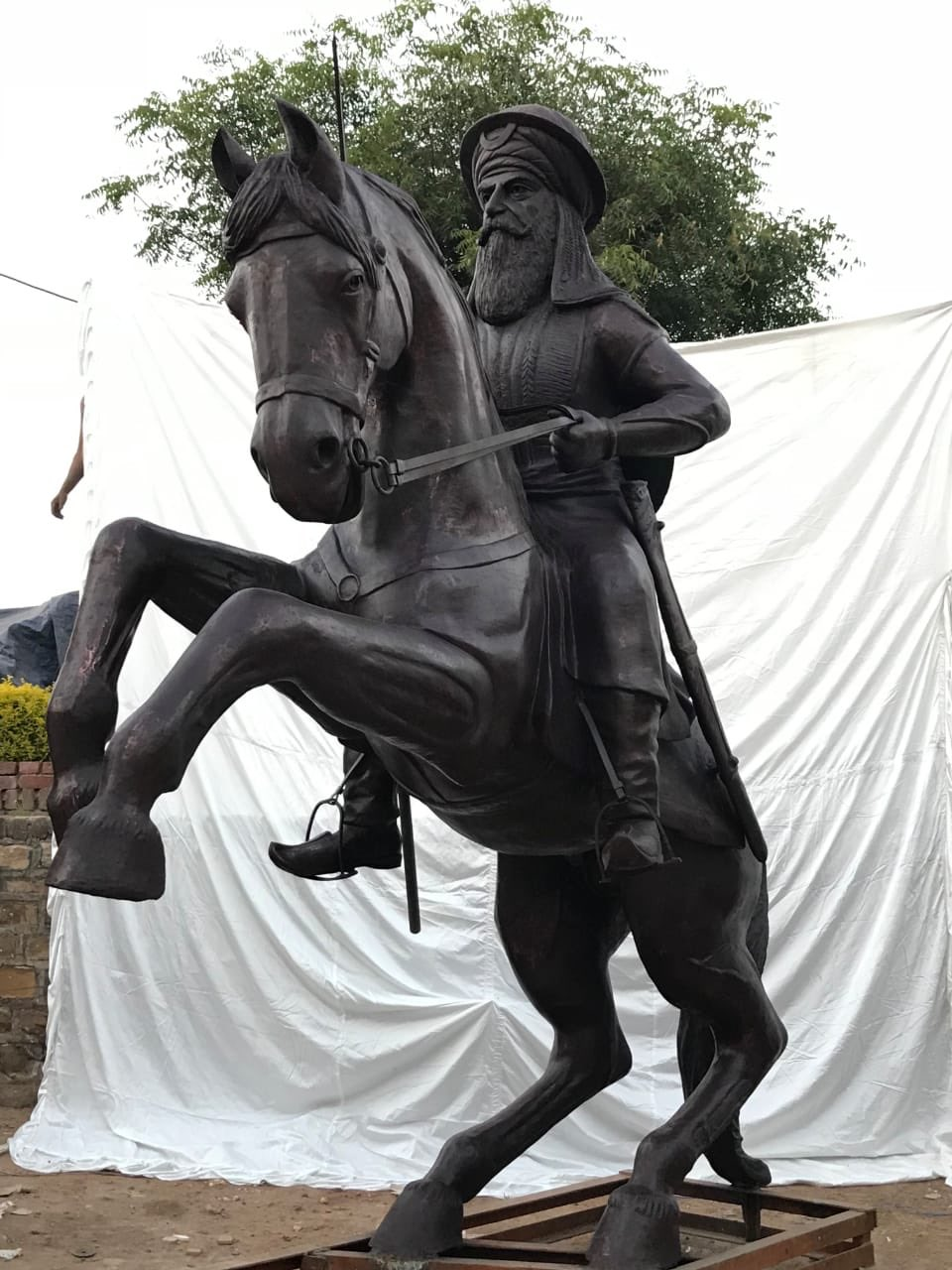
Statue of Baba Baghel Singh, Subhash Nagar Chowk, Rajouri Garden

The Baba Baghel Singh Sikh Heritage Multimedia Museum in New Delhi, India was established in his namesake.

== See also ==
- Guru Tegh Bahadur
- Nawab Kapur Singh
