= Siege of Kunjpura (1772) =

- Part of Mughal-Sikh Wars
Date	April – May 1772
Location	Kunjpura
Result	Sikh victory

Belligerents
Dal Khalsa	Mughal Empire; Supported by: Maratha Empire

Commanders and leaders
Baghel Singh; Sahib Singh; Dyal Singh Majithia; Dana Singh; Laja Singh	Mughal Ali Khan; Dilawar Ali Khan; Sheikh Kabir; Jiwan Khan; Tukoji Rao Holkar; Mahadaji Shinde

Strength
6,000	6,000 Mughals; 6,000 Afghans; 1,000 Marathas; Total: 19,000

Casualties and losses
500+	500+
- 500 killed on both sides during the first day

The siege of Kunjpura was a 14-day siege in April to May 1772 by Sikh forces led by Sahib Singh against the Mughal coalition forces led by Mughal Ali Khan. Siege ended with a Sikh victory against an allied force of Mughals and Marathas.

== Background ==
In 1770, Najib ad-Dawlah died and Zabita Khan became the new chief of Rohilla. Later in the year, the Sikhs ravaged the neighborhoods of Delhi.

Mughal Ali Khan was appointed as governor of Sirhind. The Marathas supplied him with 1,000 troops and the Afghans joined him with 6,000. He thus commanded a force of nearly 19,000 men. He crossed the Jamuna and halted on the other side of the river for 2 days. He was attacked by 600 Sikhs who later fled away. He was joined by 500 soldiers from Kunjpura under Daler Khan.

== Siege ==
Near Kunjpura, Mughal Ali Khan was attacked by Baghel Singh, Sahib Singh, Dyal Singh, Dana Singh and Laja Singh with 6,000 horsemen. Fierce fighting continued for the whole day and 500 men were killed on both sides. In the darkness of the night, Mughal Ali Khan and Daler Khan repaired the fort. The Sikhs immediately besieged them. Hostilities continued for 13 days. On the 14th day, the Sikhs defeated the enemy.

== Aftermath ==
Daler Khan advised Mughal Ali Khan to retire to Delhi. In a few days, he managed to reach Delhi safely. This siege sent shivers down the spine of the Mughal emperor Shah Alam II and the Maratha chief Janko Rao. Janko quickly moved towards Panipat and Karnal to fight the Sikhs.

== See also ==
- Nihang
- Martyrdom and Sikhism
