= Hariana =

- Town
- Hariana

Punjabi,English transcription(s)
- Location in Punjab, India
- Coordinates: 31.64°N 75.84°E
- Country: India
- State: Punjab
- District: Hoshiarpur
- Founder: Haria Jatt
- Elevation: 300 m (980 ft)

Population (2025 estimate))
  - Total: 12,800

Languages
  - Official: Punjabi
- Time zone: UTC+5:30 (IST)

Hariana is a town and a municipal council in Hoshiarpur district in the Indian state of Punjab. It is about 100 km from Amritsar International Airport.

== History ==
Hariana was founded by a Jatt named Haria and Hariana is conjunction of 2 words Hari + ana meaning the abode of Haria Jatt later the town was sold to Naru Rajput and it became the seat of Chaudhri/Jagirdars of the area during Mughal era. in 1748 Sardar Krora Singh Virk of Karorsinghia Misl captured Hariana and made it his headquarters,later Sardar Baghel Singh of the same Misl made it his headquarters and the family possessed it till Maharaja Ranjit Singh took the area from them

== Demographics ==
As of 2001 India census, Hariana had a population of 7813. Males constitute 52% of the population and females 48%. Hariana has an average literacy rate of 76%, higher than the national average of 59.5%: male literacy is 79%, and female literacy is 73%. In Hariana, 11% of the population is under 6 years of age.

== Geography ==
The city of Hariana, Punjab, is located at the latitude and longitude of 31.64 °North and 75.84 °East, respectively. It has an average elevation of 300 meters above the sea level. The climate conditions here are varied according to the seasons. The summer season starts at this city from April and lasts up to June with maximum temperature can reaches up to 40°C. It is followed by the monsoon season during which the precipitation starts falling from mid July till the month of September. The region experiences maximum rain falls in July-August period with an average of 132 mm. Furthermore, winters arrive at this city during the end of November and last up to mid February. During this season, the temperature can down to 5°C, particularly in January. Hence, the months of October and November provide the best time to travel around Hariana, Hoshiarpur, Punjab

== Administration ==
As mentioned earlier in the demographic factors, there are more than 1894 houses in the city of Hariana. The responsibility of providing all the basic amenities to them is owned by the Municipal Council. In reality, Hariana Municipality is one of the oldest municipalities in the entire Punjab region. It was established in the year 1867 and later in 1924, it was declared as small town committee. After independence or especially after 1955, it has been functioning as a Class III municipality and it also contains a library. Furthermore, Hariana Municipality ensures that all the civic amenities should be available in the city such as street lighting, water & sanitation, road and transportation and many more.

== Culture ==
People in Hariana city of Punjab solemnize various festivals together. The most celebrated festival in this city, like all over in the state, is Baisakhi. It is a harvest festival, which is celebrated mainly by the farming communities. During this occasion, farmers take an early bath and reach the Temple or Gurdwara to thank the Almighty for the plentiful harvest and also pray for their prosperity in future. At this festival, men and women, who wear traditional Punjabi attires, move towards the field to celebrate this harvest festival. Apart from that, the festivals like Diwali and Holi are also celebrated with lots of enthusiasm and celebration.

== Famous Personalities ==
The land of Hariana has been an abode of many famous personalities who belonged to different fields. The city is named after Swami Hari Das who was the guru of the popular singer Tansen.Here there is the resting place of Baba Baghel Singh Ji a Well known Sikh Warrior Who Won Delhi Fighting besides Baba Jassa Singh Ahluwalia. In fact, this place was once the famous music gharana as Gujjar Mal Vasudev Raagi and Pandit Telu Ram were the singers as well as residents of Hariana. They had Hariana as their tehsil during the Mughal era when they made a Quila in an area called Malot located in proximity to this city. Besides that, this town has also provided many freedom fighters such as Lala Lachman Das, Sardar Partap Singh and Pandit Jagat Ram. There is a technical institute here named after freedom fighter Pt. Jagat Ram, which is called as J.R. Government Polytechnic Hoshiarpur. Hariana is also the birthplace of Late Ch. Kartar Singh, a great social worker and Mahatma Hans Raj, a famous Arya Samaji Leader.

== Places of Interest ==
The city of Hariana is widely popular for temples and guruduwaras located here. People from varied regions of Punjab state as well as neighbouring states visit these temples. However, majority of these visitors come to see Sitla Temple, which has the recognition of being the biggest temple in Hariana region. Other temples like Sati Mandir, Sita Ram Mandir, Meera Ji Da Baag, Gugga Pir Mandir, Dharam Sabha Mandir, Gebi Ram Ji Da Mandir, Lakh Data Ji Nkkiwal and Satya Narayan Mandir are also places of interest among the people. Besides that, Ram Lila of Hariana is also very famous mainly during the occasion of Dushera, a famous festival of the country. In fact, thousands of people come at this city to see the Ram Lila. Besides that, this place also attracts visitors for Hari Nam Sankirtan.

== Transport ==
The city of Hariana in Hoshiarpur District has both rail and road links from the state capital, Chandigarh and the major cities of Punjab. The state transport buses and private buses have their regular service through this city that makes convenient to the inhabitants in commuting from here to their desired destination. The presence of local transportation in the shape of taxis and auto-rickshaws also makes their traveling lot easier. As far as railway links are concerned, the nearest railway station to Hariana region is Hoshiarpur Railway Station which is around one kilometer distance. However, people can also consider Nasrala Railway Station that has roughly nine kilometers distance from this city. Apart from that, the nearest airport to Hariana is Ludhiana Airport, which is located around 78 km distance. Hariana at a glance State: Punjab District: Hoshiarpur Elevation: 300 meters Latitude: 31.64°N Longitude: 75.84°E Official Language: Punjabi Pin Code: 144208 STD Code: 01886

== Famous Trusts ==
There are many trusts and societies working for the welfare of the people in the city of Hariana, Punjab. Perhaps, the most famous of them is Smriti Janj Ghar, which was established by some non-political personalities. This trust is built in the memory of Late Sh. Muni Lal Sabherwal, Late Sh. Hira Lal and Late Sh. Rakesh Kumar Maingi who were killed by terrorists near village Bhikhowal. Apart from that, Hariana city also has a Children Welfare Society who offers its services to aid poor children living in this region. Sanatan Dharamsabha Hariana is also a famous trust serving for the welfare of the society.
