= Gurdwara Sis Ganj Sahib =

Sikh temple in Delhi, India

Gurudwara Sis Ganj Sahib
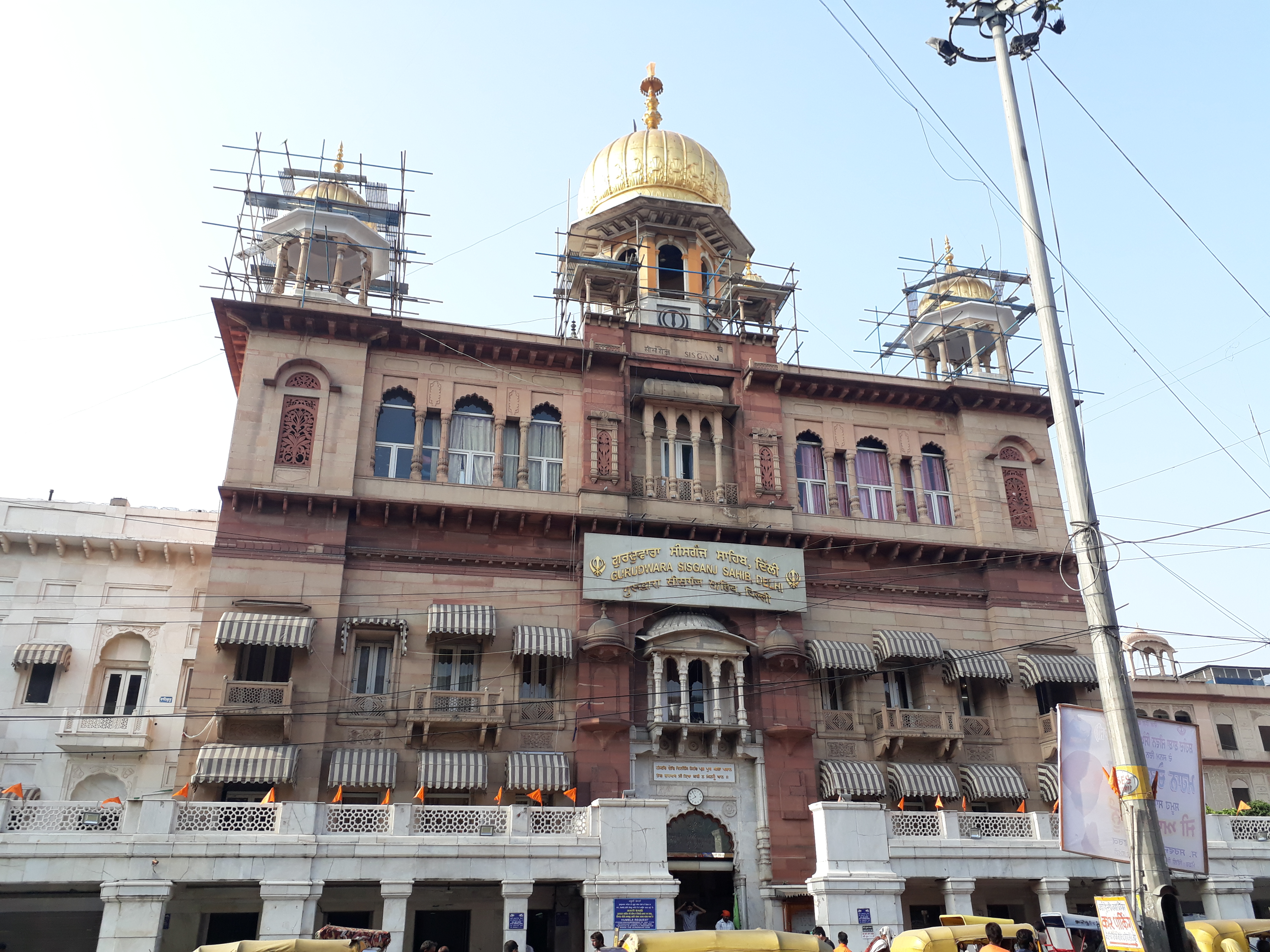
- Gurdwara Sis Ganj Sahib Delhi

Religion
- Affiliation: Sikhism

Location
- Location: Chandni Chowk, Old Delhi, India.
- State: Delhi
- Interactive map of Gurudwara Sis Ganj Sahib
- Coordinates: 28.6558°N 77.2325°E

Architecture
- Style: Sikh architecture, Islamic Architecture and Mughal Architecture
- Completed: built in 1783, current structure mostly built post 1930

Gurdwara Sis Ganj Sahib is one of the nine historical Gurdwaras in Delhi. It was first constructed in 1783 as a small shrine by Baghel Singh to commemorate the martyrdom site of the ninth Sikh Guru, Tegh Bahadur and was probably expanded after Indian Rebellion of 1857 or after Partition of India. Before its construction the Mughal Kotwali (Police Station and Jail) was situated here. After the Indian Rebellion of 1857 the Mughal Kotwali was demolished by the British and the land was given to the Sikhs as the maharaja of Patiala and other Sikh soldiers helped the British to defeat the Mughal soldiers by providing large numbers of ammunition and soldiers. Its current building was made by Rai Bahadur Narain Singh a contractor who build most of roads in Lutyens New Delhi construction under British Rule. Situated in Chandni Chowk in Old Delhi, it marks the site where the ninth Sikh Guru was beheaded on the orders of the Mughal emperor Aurangzeb on 11 November 1675. The Sikh regiment of the Indian army salute the Sis Ganj Gurudwara before saluting the president of India since 1979, the only instance of saluting twice in the Republic Day parade by a regiment of Indian army.

== History ==
=== Execution of Guru Tegh Bahadur ===
The ninth Sikh Guru, Guru Tegh Bahadur was beheaded here on 24 November 1675 on the orders of the Mughal Emperor Aurangzeb. However, before the Guru's body could be quartered and exposed to public view, it was taken under the cover of darkness by Lakhi Shah Vanjara who then burnt his own house to cremate Guru's body; today, at this site stands Gurdwara Rakab Ganj Sahib.

The severed head ("Sis" in Hindi or Punjabi) of Guru Tegh Bahadur was brought to Anandpur Sahib by Bhai Jaita, another disciple of the Guru. Another gurudwara by the same name, Gurudwara Sisganj Sahib at Anandpur Sahib in Punjab, marks this site, where, in November 1675, the head of the martyred Guru Teg Bahadur, brought by Bhai Jaita (renamed Bhai Jivan Singh according to Sikh rites), in defiance of the Mughal authorities, was cremated.

The trunk of the tree beneath which the head of the Guru was severed and the well used by him for taking bath during his prison term have been preserved in the shrine. Also, adjoining the gurudwara, stands the Kotwali (police station), where Guru was imprisoned and his disciples were tortured. Located close to it is the Sunehri Masjid (Chandni Chowk).

=== Construction of a shrine by Baghel Singh ===
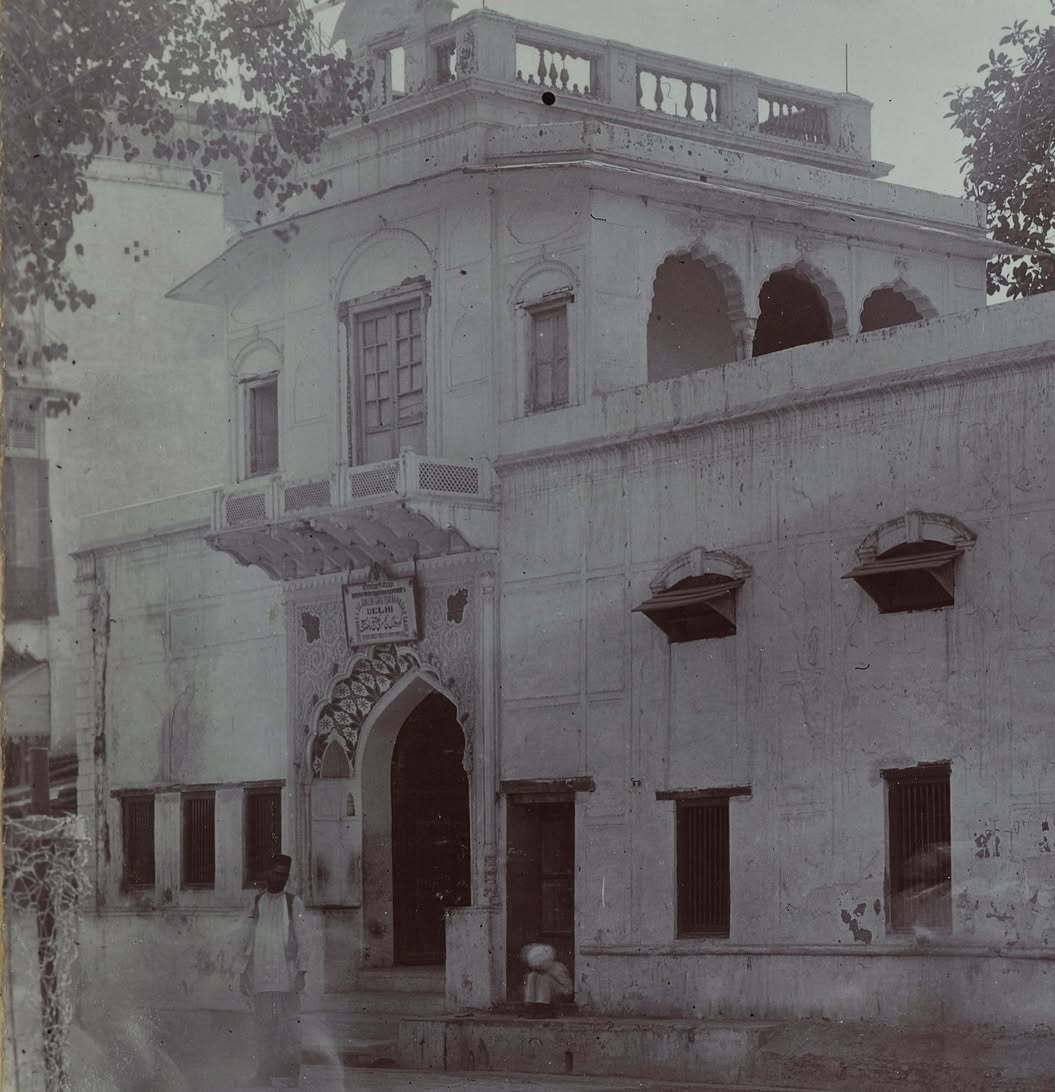
Photograph of Gurdwara Sis Ganj Sahib in Chandni Chowk, Delhi, ca.1913–16

On 11 March 1783, Sikh military leader Baghel Singh (1730–1802) of the Karora Misl marched into Delhi along with his army. He occupied the Diwan-i-Am, the Mughal emperor Shah Alam II made a settlement with them agreeing to allow Baghel Singh to raise gurudwaras on Sikh historical sites in the city and receive six annas in a rupee (37.5%) of all the octroi duties in the capital. Sis Ganj was one of the shrines built by him (with eight Sikh shrines connected to the Sikh gurus being constructed in the city by him), within the time span of eight months, from April to November 1783.

Baghel Singh did not actually know the exact location that the guru's beheading had taken place, only knowing that the place was somewhere near a mosque in Chandni Chowk. A local, elderly Muslim woman belonging to the water-carrier caste got in-contact with him and revealed that her father had actually been the one who had cleaned the site of the guru's execution after the event and he was an eye-witness to the execution itself. She explained that the guru at the time of his beheading had been seated upon a wooden chauki (seat) that faced in the eastern direction of the compound wall of the mosque. A part of this very wall was then removed and a shrine was then constructed in the compound.

=== Modern period ===
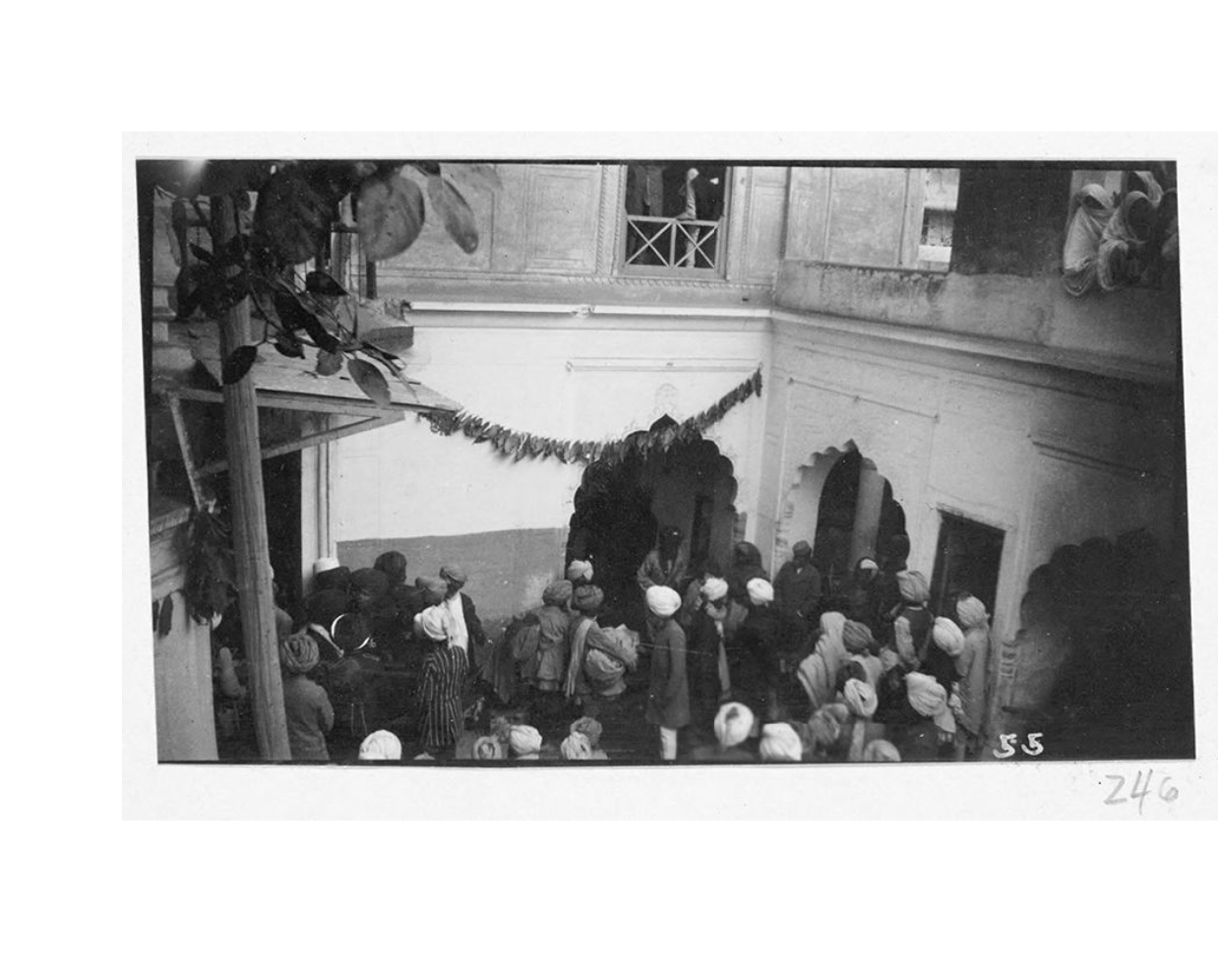
Photograph of a ceremony at Gurdwara Sis Ganj Sahib, Chandni Chowk, Delhi, by Gertrude Bell, January 1903

However, due to volatile political climate in the coming century, the site alternated between being a mosque and a gurudwara. It became a site of dispute between two communities, and litigation followed. Eventually, after prolonged ligation the Privy Council during British Raj ruled in the favour of the Sikh litigants and the present structure was added in 1930; gold gild of the domes was added in the coming years. The Mughal-era Kotwali was handed over to the Delhi Sikh Gurdwara Management Committee around 1971.

== Photo gallery ==
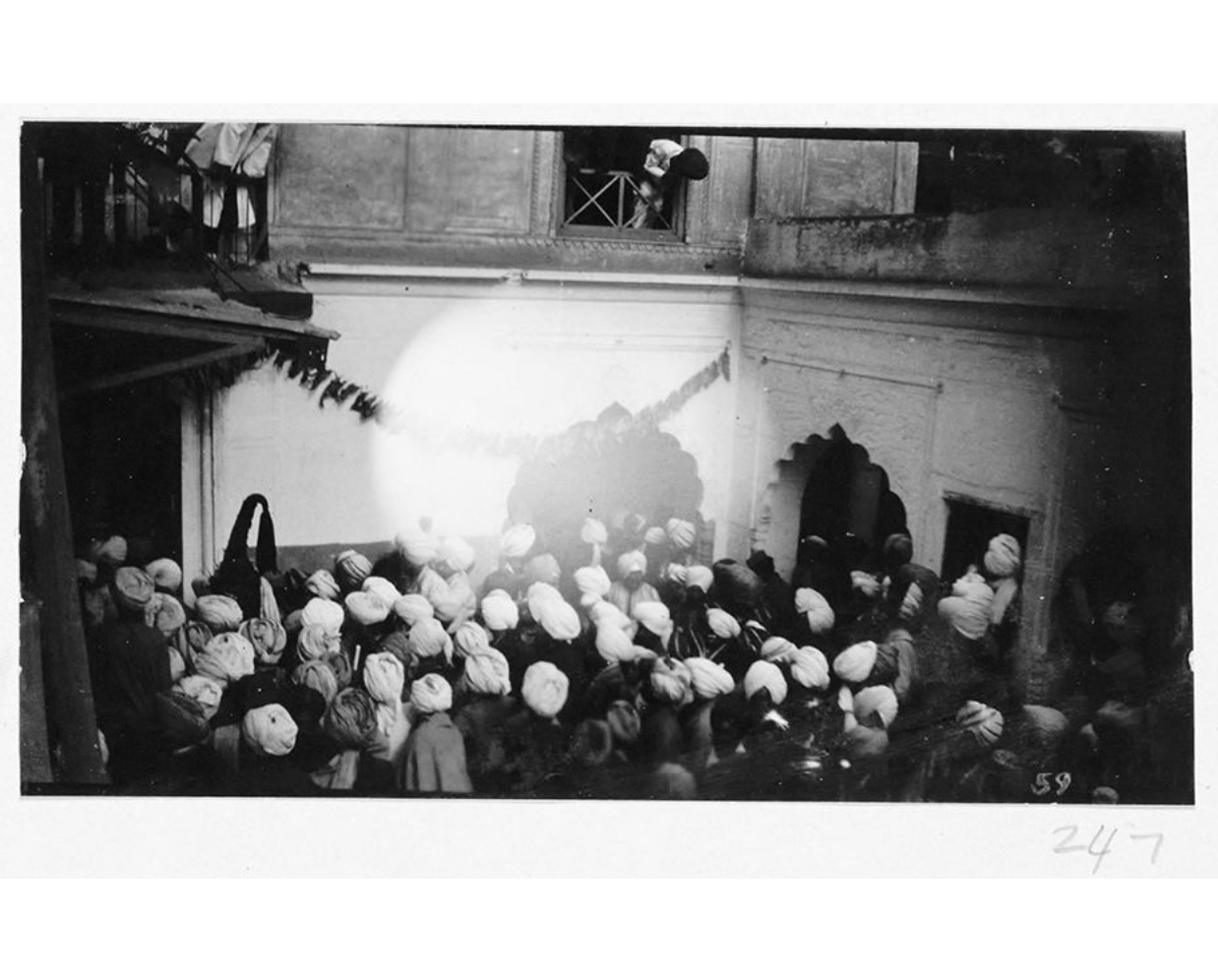
Photograph of a ceremony at Gurdwara Sis Ganj Sahib, Chandni Chowk, Delhi, by Gertrude Bell, January 1903

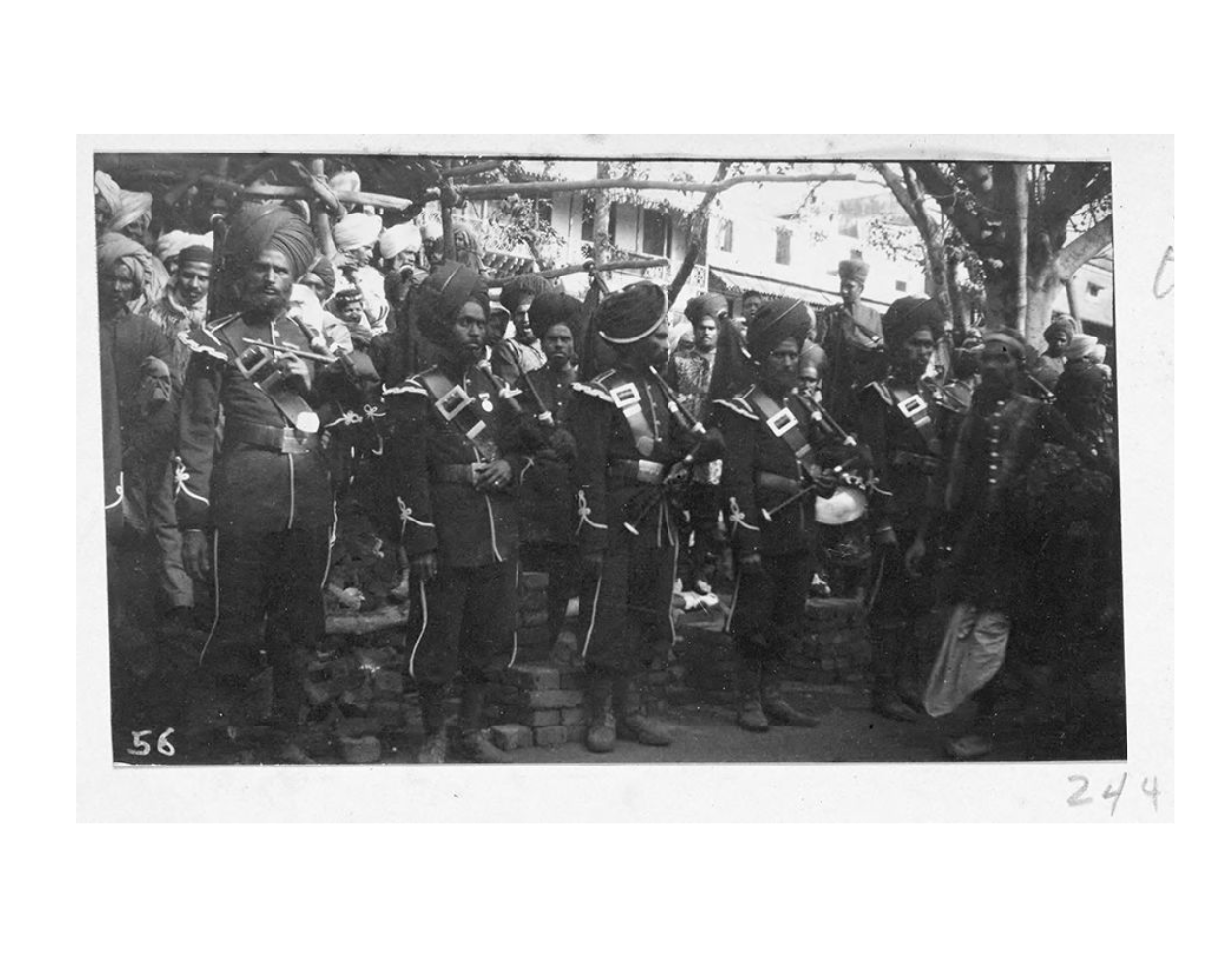
Photograph of a ceremony at Gurdwara Sis Ganj Sahib, Chandni Chowk, Delhi, by Gertrude Bell, January 1903

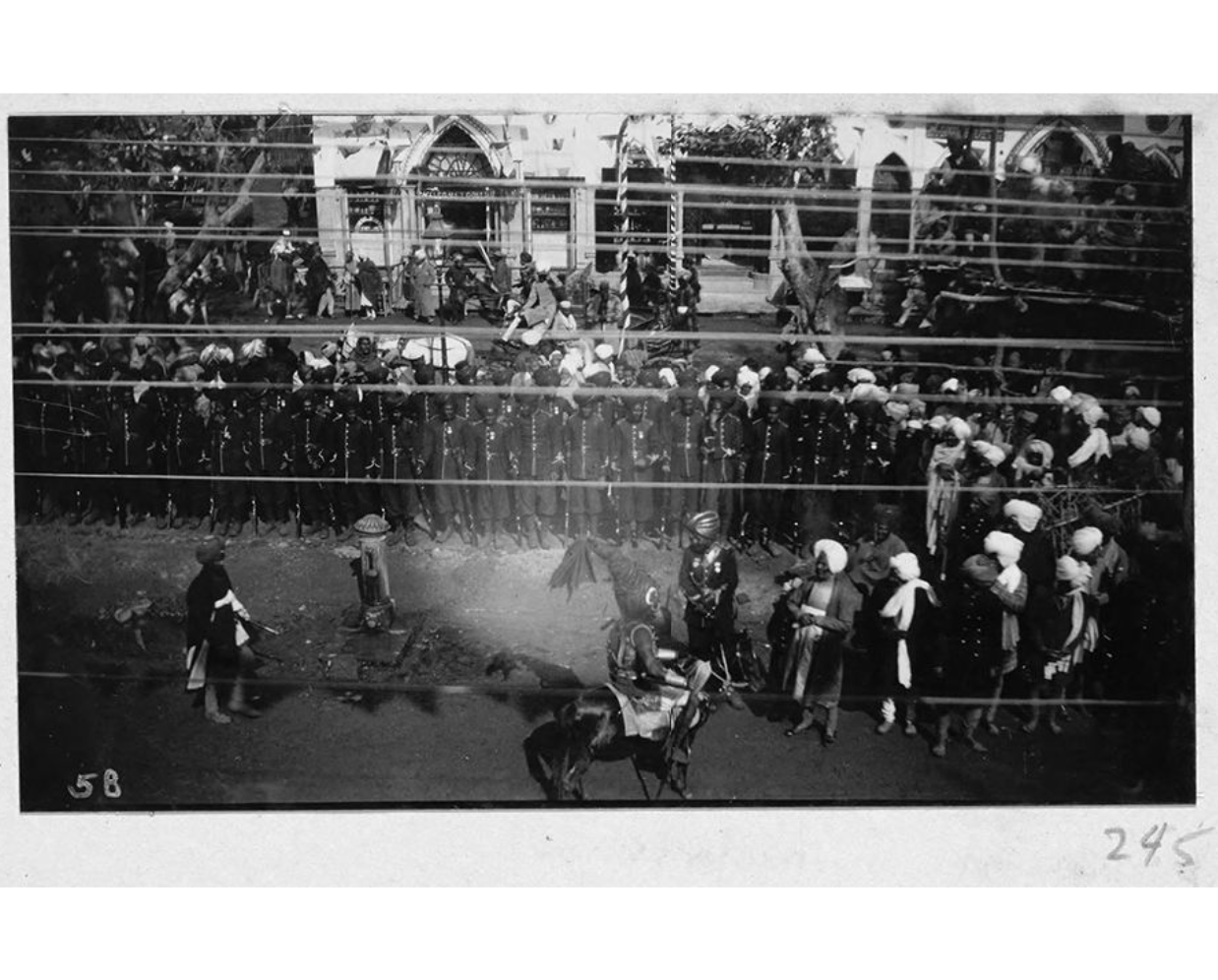
Photograph of a ceremony at Gurdwara Sis Ganj Sahib, Chandni Chowk, Delhi, by Gertrude Bell, January 1903

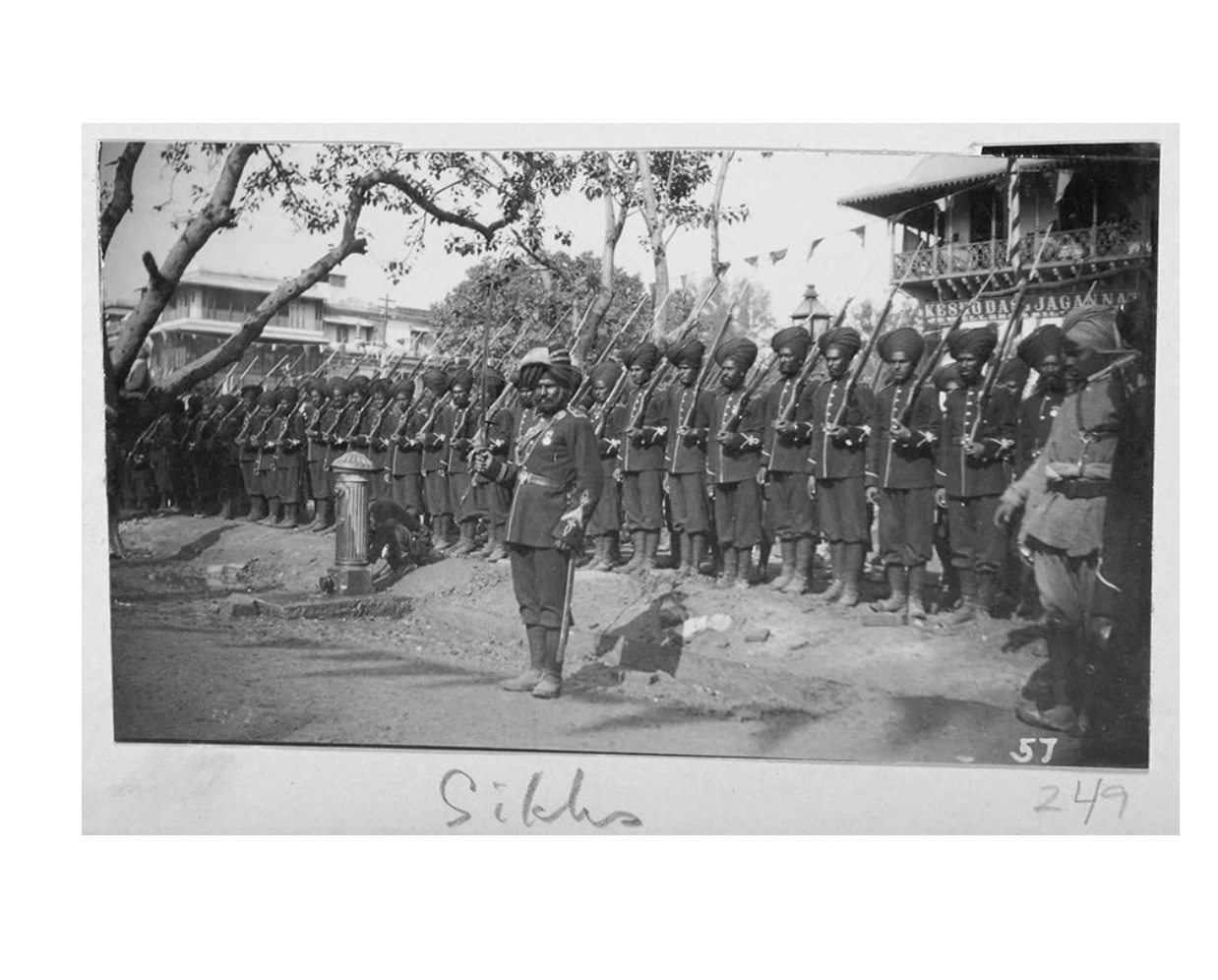
Photograph of Sikh soldiers at a ceremony at Gurdwara Sis Ganj Sahib, Chandni Chowk, Delhi, by Gertrude Bell, January 1903

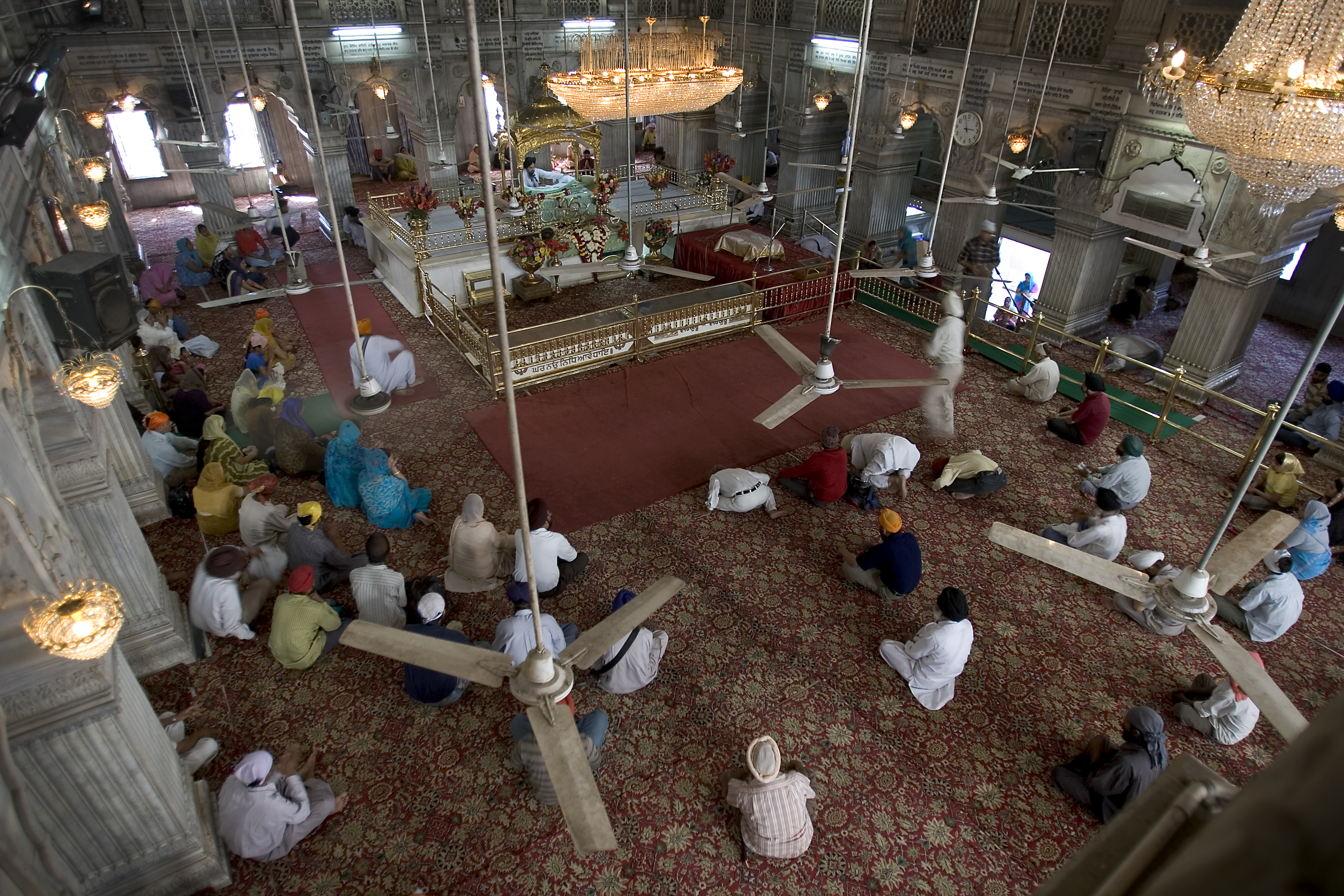
View of the Prayer hall from above

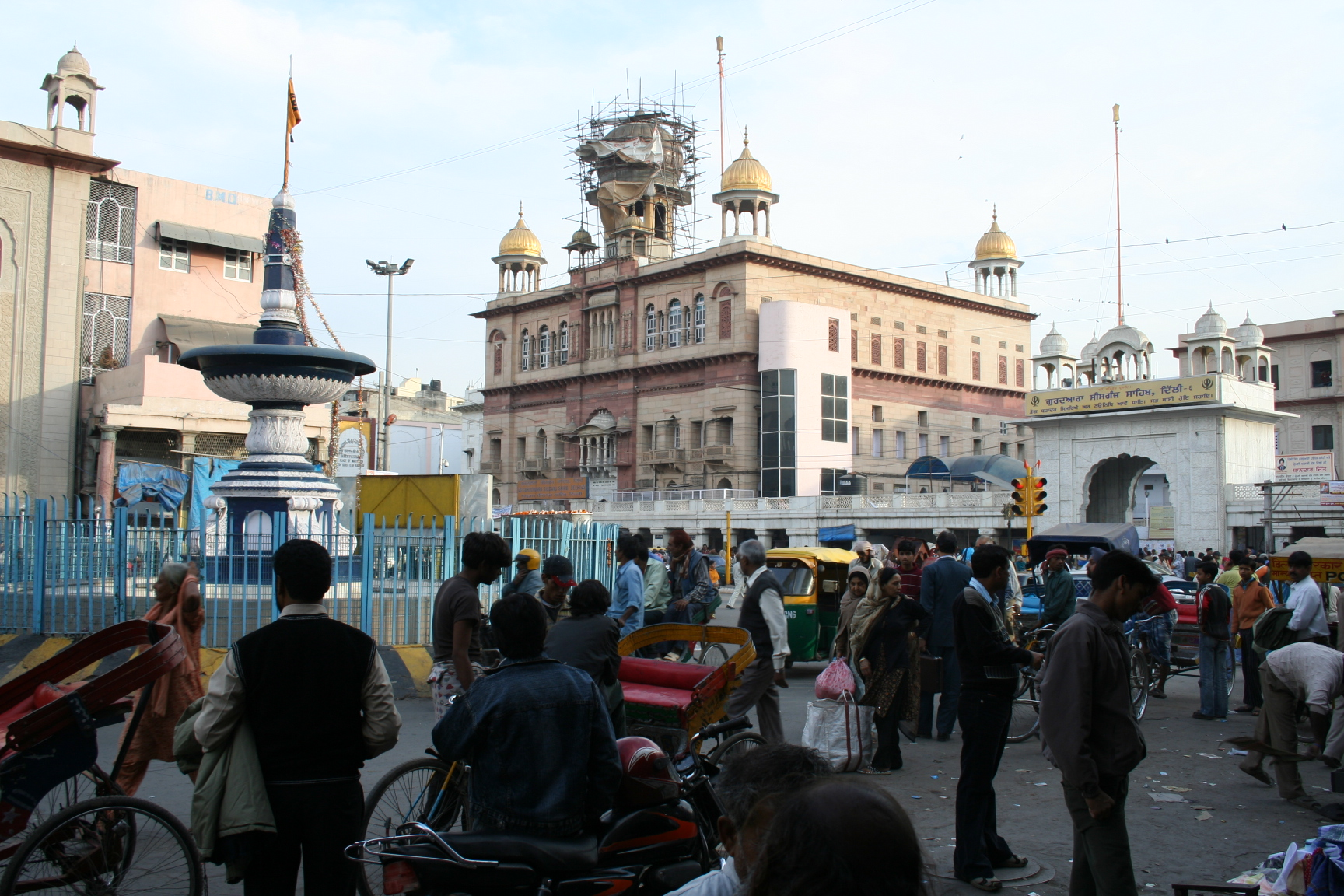
Gurdwara Sri Guru Sis Ganj Sahib in Chandni Chowk

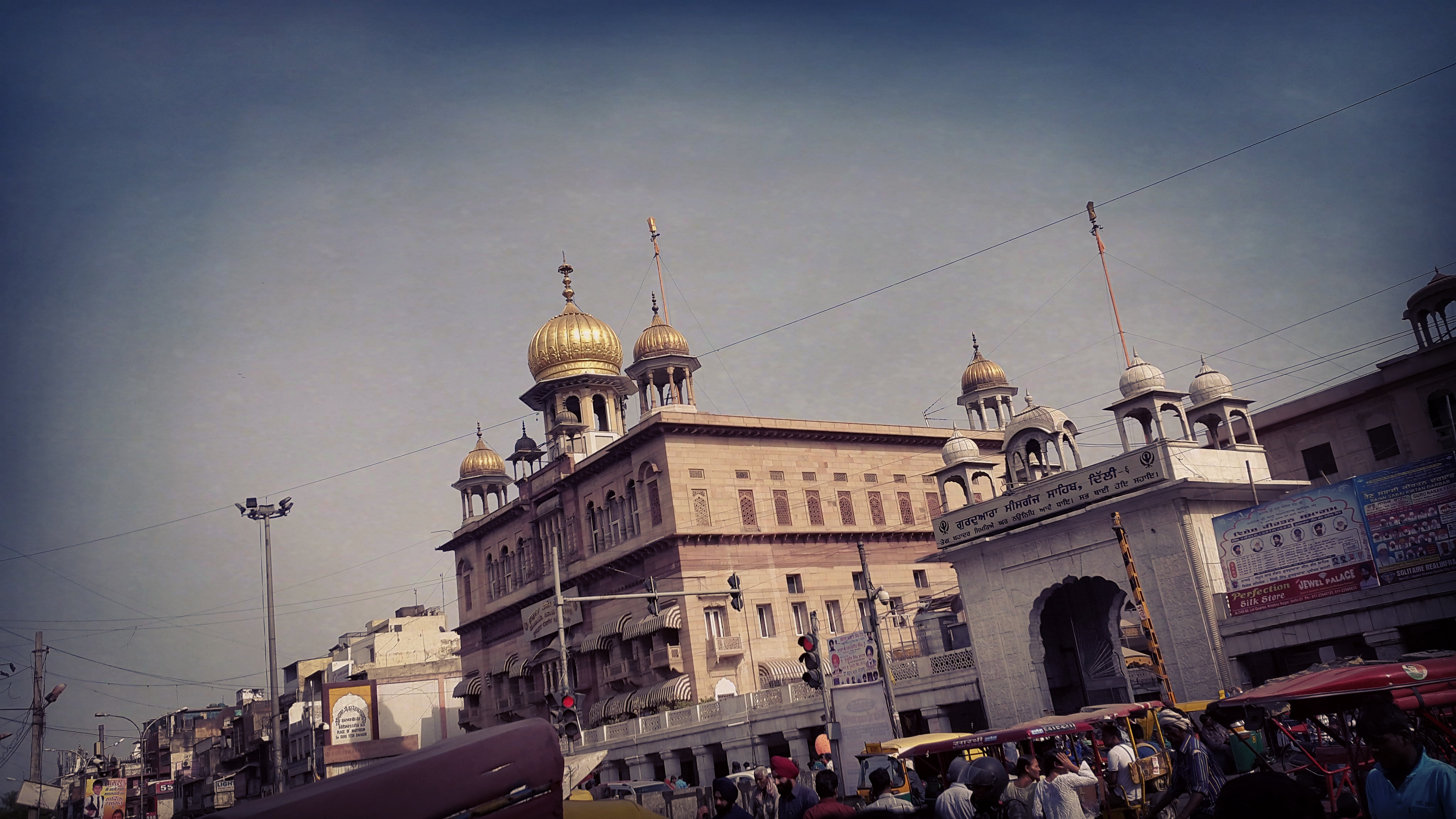
Sri Guru Sheesh Ganj Sahib Gurudwara

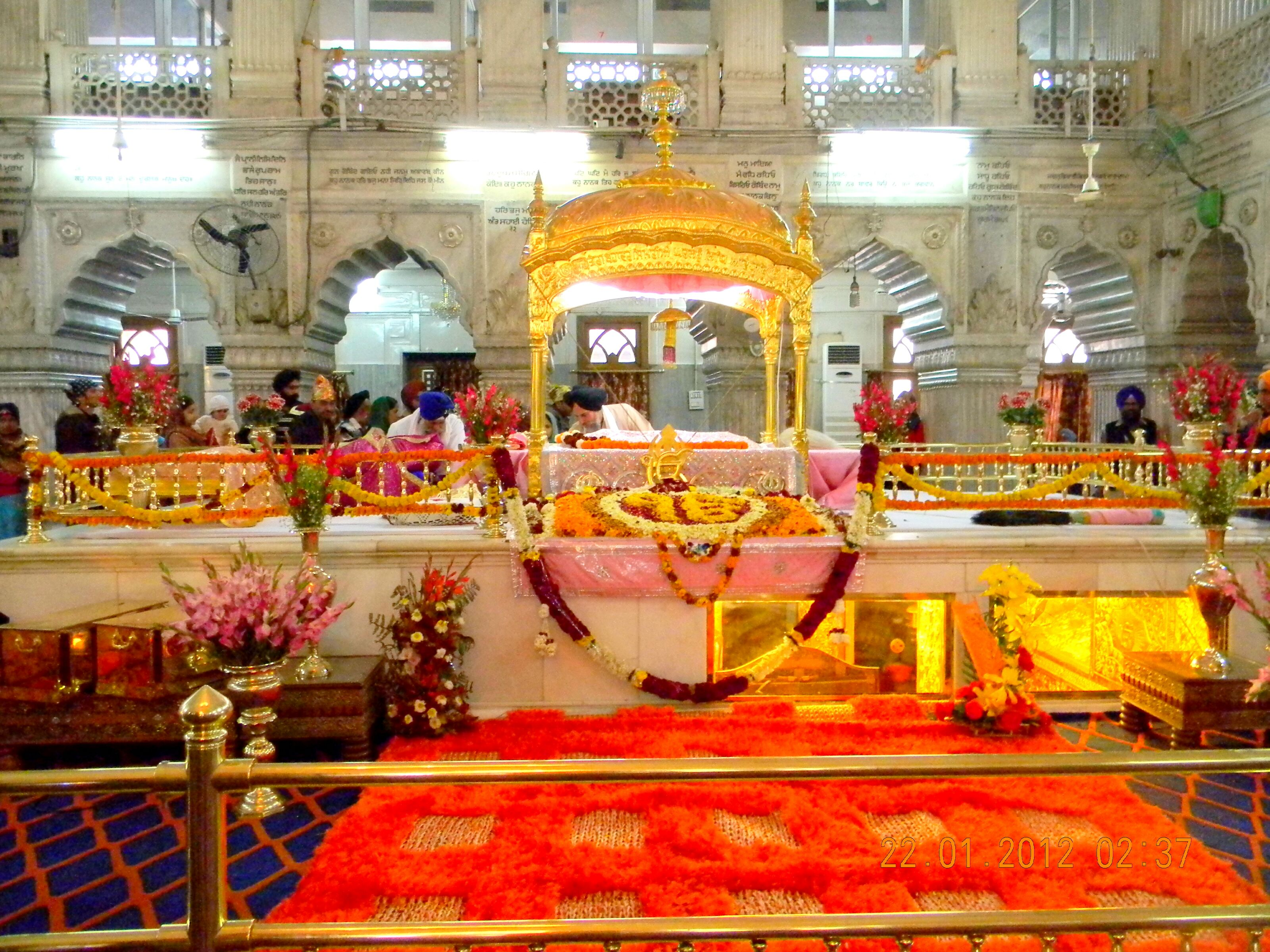
View of the front of the Darbar Sahib or Prayer Hall showing the Palki housing the Guru Granth Sahibji

== See also ==
- Golden temple
- Sikhism
- Gurdwara Rakab Ganj Sahib
