= Majnu Ka Tilla =

Majnu-ka-tilla New Aruna Nagar Colony, Samyeling
- Neighborhood of Delhi
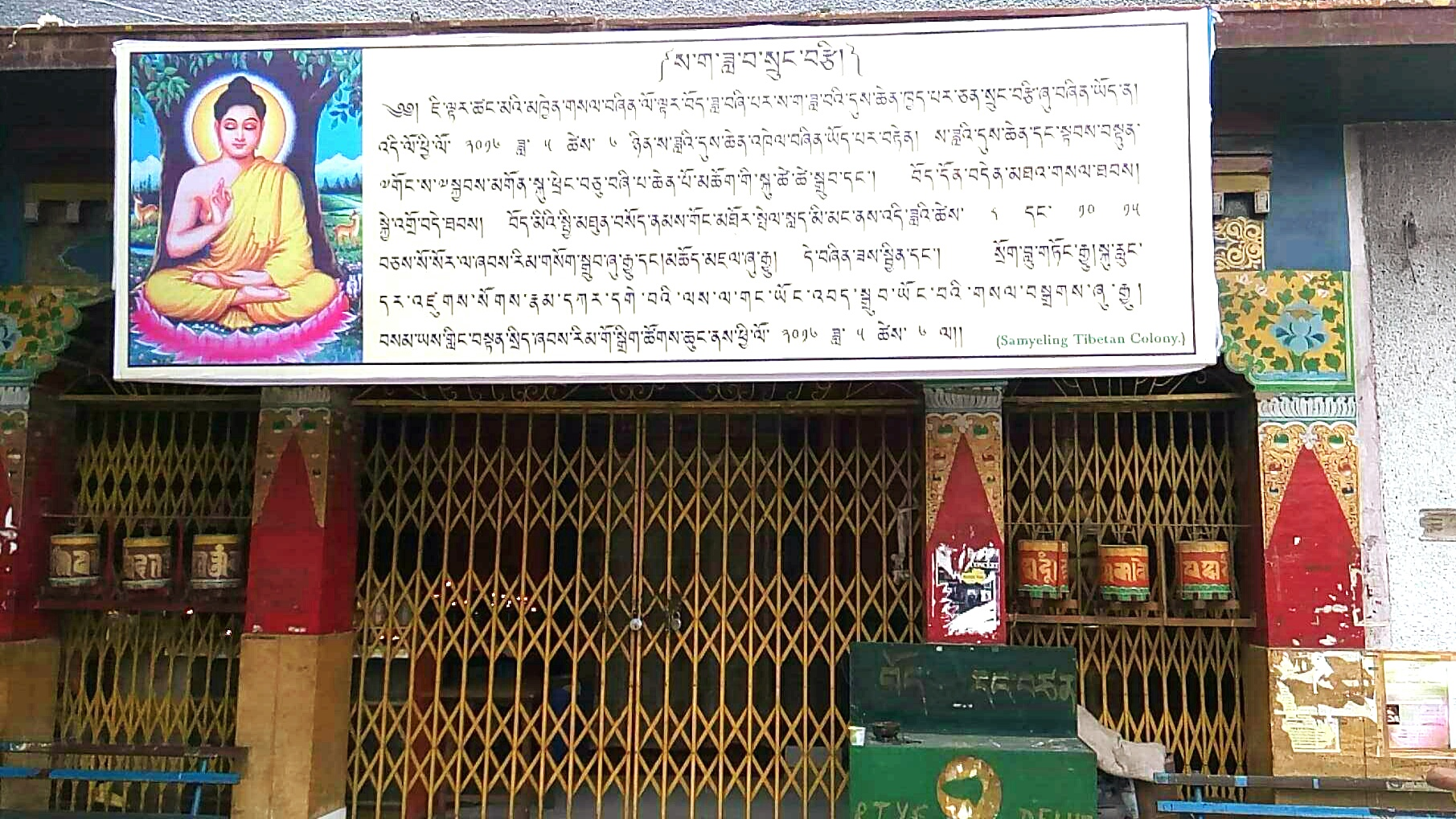
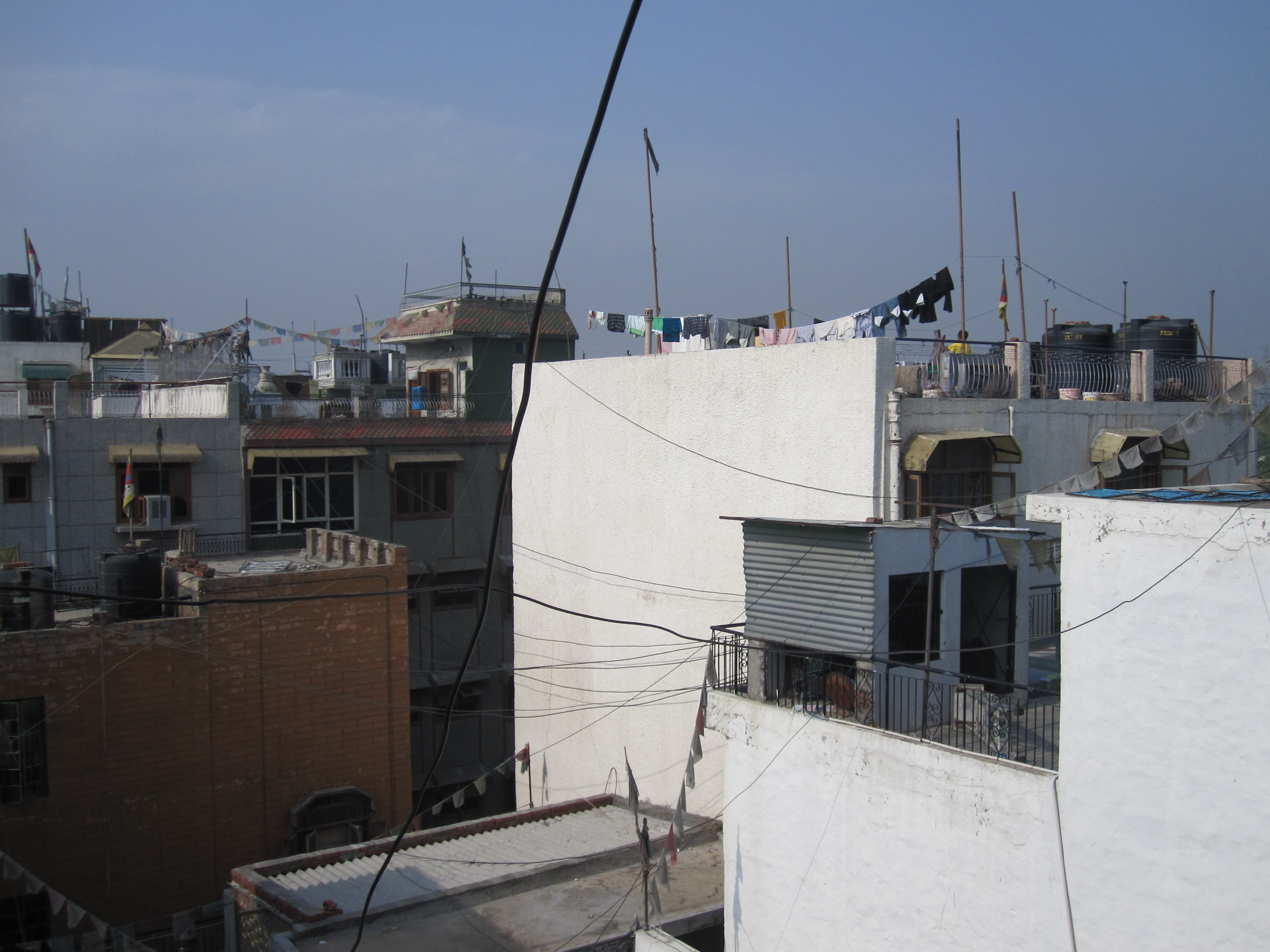
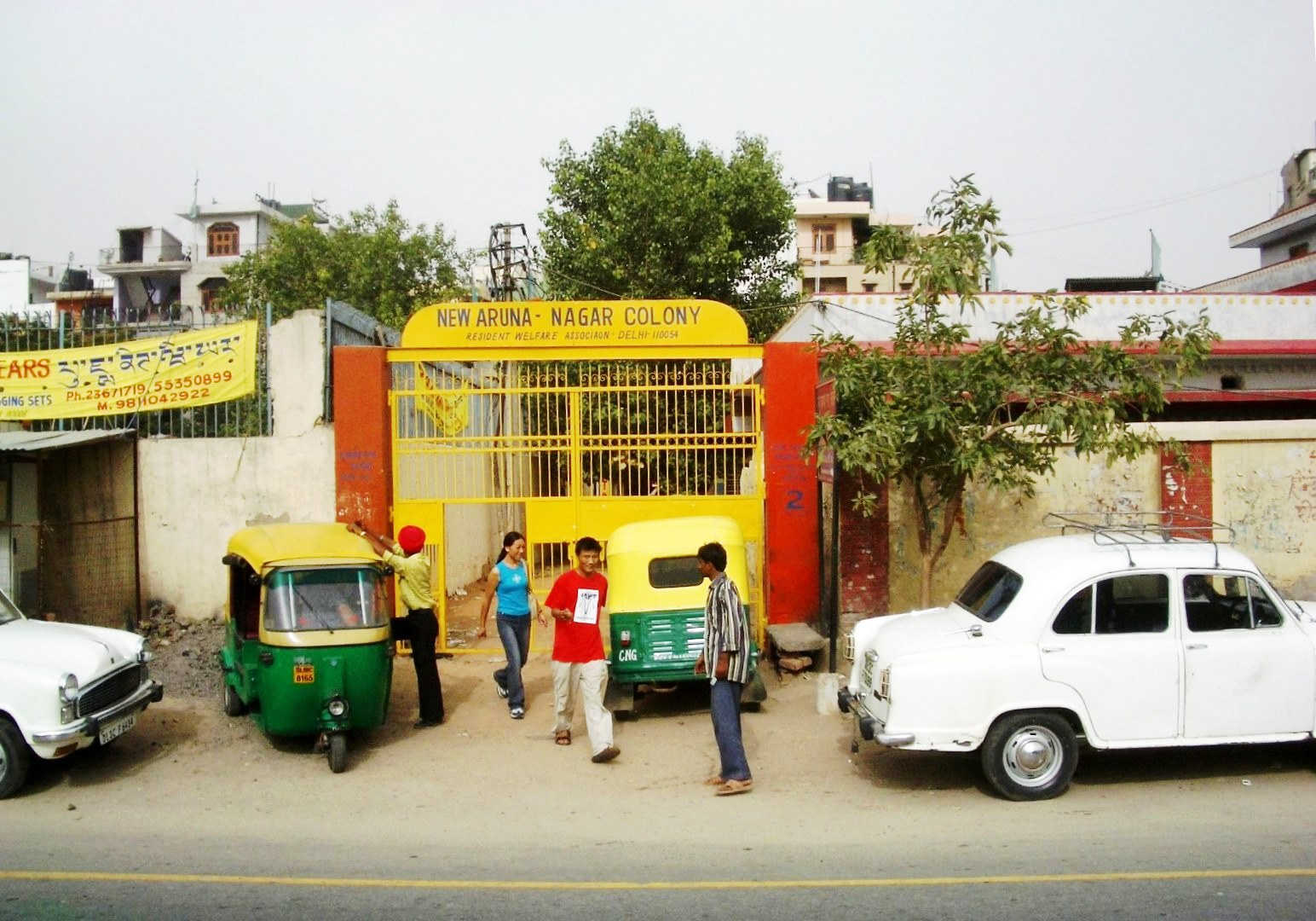
- A Buddhist monastery View from a rooftop Entrance to the settlement

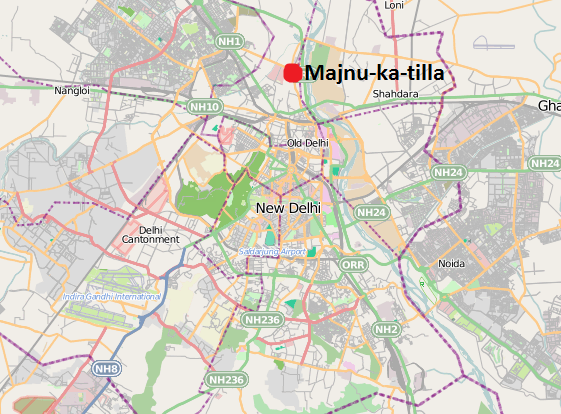
- Location of Majnu-ka-tilla in Delhi
- Coordinates: 28.70137°N 77.22816°E
- Country: India
- State: Delhi
- District: North Delhi
- Established: 1960

Population (2000)
  - Total: 2,500
- Time zone: UTC+5:30 (Indian Standard Time)
- Pincode(s): 110054
- Area code: +91 11

Majnu-ka-tilla (MKT) is a colony in Delhi, India that was established around 1950. (Note: Express India writes that it was founded in 1959, while The Times of India writes that it was founded in 1962.) Majnu-ka-tilla is officially called New Aruna Nagar Colony, Chungtown, and Samyeling. It is part of North Delhi district and is located at the bank of the Yamuna River (NH-1) near ISBT Kashmiri Gate.

== History ==
=== 15th-18th century: Sikh period ===
The historic name of the area literally means the hillock of Majnu, after the tilla or mound where during the reign of Sikandar Lodhi (r. 1489–1517) on Delhi Sultanate, a local Iranian Sufi mystic Abdulla, nicknamed Majnu (lost in love), met first Sikh Guru, Guru Nanak Dev Ji on 20 July 1505. Majnu ferried people across the Yamuna river for free as a service to God, his devotion resulted in the guru Ji staying here till the end of July.

The sixth Sikh guru, Guru Har Gobind (r. 1606-1644) also stayed here.

In 1783, Sikh military leader Baghel Singh Dhaliwal built the Majnu ka Tila Gurudwara to commemorate the stay of Guru Nanak Dev.

Today it is one of oldest extant Sikh shrines in Delhi and the surrounding estate of donated by early 19th-century Sikh emperor, Ranjit Singh.

=== 19th-20th century: British colonial period ===
Majnu Ka Tilla area has three main residential settlements with total 3000–3500 homes, Aruna Nagar, New Aruna Nagar and Old Chandrawal village, which was built up in the early 1900s, when British government settled labourers involved in the construction of the Central Secretariat buildings, during the construction of the New Delhi. The next round of settlement came post-independence in 1958-59 when Aruna Nagar was developed by the Land and Development wing of the Ministry of Urban Development as it disburses 925 plots of 40 sq. yard each, to people resettled here from various parts of North Delhi. The Tibetan refugee camp later named New Aruna Nagar developed after 1960.

=== 1950 onwards: Tibetan refugee settlement ===
Just as Aruna Nagar was developing, the 1959 Tibetan uprising took place in March, most residents of Majnu-ka-tilla left Tibet in 1959–60, when the Dalai Lama too went into exile to Dharamshala. Soon, a small Tibetan refugee camp up across the road, on the Yamuna riverbed. The land was allotted by the Government of India to the refugees in 1960. After the Sino-Indian War in 1962, many of the refugees who had previously settled temporarily near the Indo-Chinese border shifted here. Today, it is home to second generation of Tibet refugees and is also known as Samyeling, through colloquially as "Little-Tibet" or "Mini-Tibet".

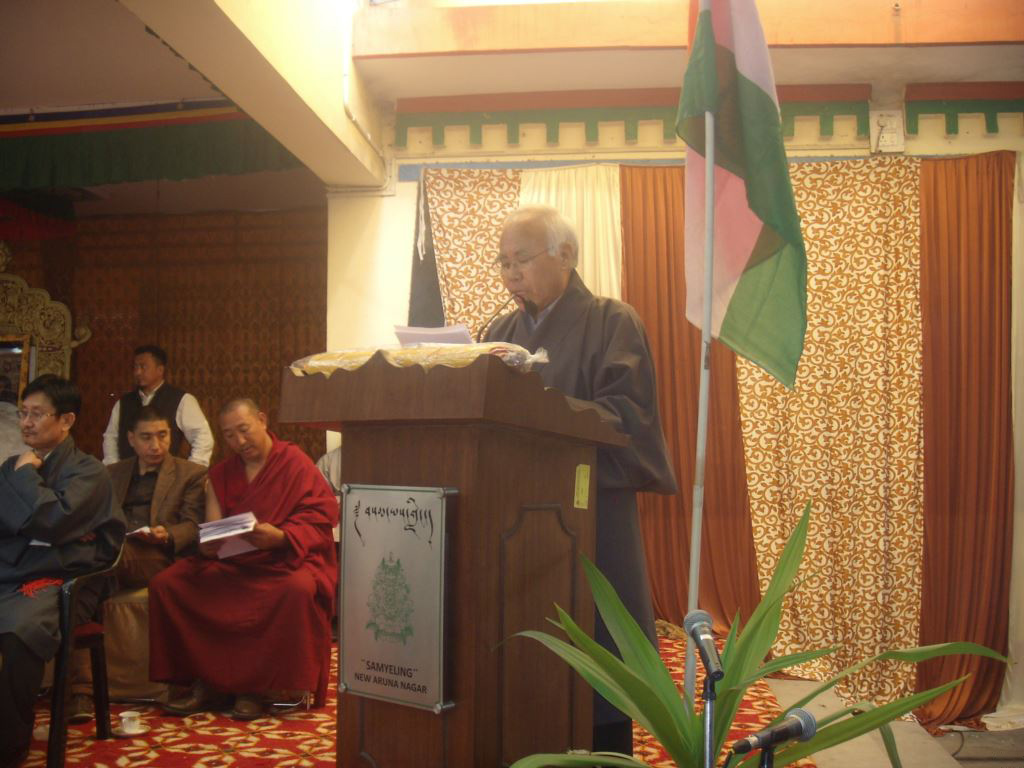
Tempa Tsering, Representative of 14th Dalai Lama to New Delhi and member Tibetan Government in Exile, speaking at a gathering, Majnu Ka Tilla, 2013

The legal status of Majnu-ka-tilla has previously come into dispute. In 1995, residents were "given a formal assurance from the Centre" that they would be allowed to remain at the site until the international dispute over Tibet was settled. In June 2006, the colony was served a court-issued notice indicating that it would be demolished in connection with the Delhi government's road expansion and Yamuna River beautification plan. At least two buildings were demolished in connection with this order. As of 2012, however, a court order had avoided eviction, regularising the status of the colony. In March 2013, Government of Delhi included New Aruna Nagar (Tibetan refugee camp) in its list of 895 "to-be-regularised colonies".

The refugee colony experienced widespread flooding in 2010 rainy season, as a result many of the residents took reinforcement measure in their buildings. On 20 June 2013, during the North India floods, the Yamuna river breached its banks and inundated numerous houses in the low-lying area. They remained partially submerged for several days, and people shifted to upper floors or to relief camps. The floods also lead to power outages and water shortages, raising concerns of health hazards.

== Economy ==
The economy of Majnu-ka-tilla centres around hotels, guest-houses and restaurants. Another important aspect of the economy is home rentals as a large population is cramped in closely built houses, several floors high and approachable through narrow bylanes. In addition, there is a market of retail stalls, including bookshops, curio shops, metalsmiths, and a beauty parlor; internet cafes, and travel agencies. The neighborhood is extremely popular among foreign and domestic tourists. The location is close to popular universities of Delhi like Delhi University and Ambedkar University. Thus students comprises a large tourists demography of this area.

== Culture ==
Majnu-ta-killa houses a monastery and Buddhist temple, preaching the Tibetan-Buddhism. The Saka Dewa, Losar, Birthday of Dalai Lama are most famous festivities celebrated here.

== Demographics ==
The colony had approximately 2,500 residents in 378 family groups as of 2000. Residents have strong ethnic identification: in one survey of young adult recent arrivals from Tibet and young adult children of Tibetan refugees in Majnu-ka-tilla, all identified as 100% Tibetan, nearly all wanted to marry Tibetans, and around 60% said that 80% or more of their friends were Tibetan.

== Administration ==
Administratively, it falls under the Civil Lines subdivision of the North Delhi district of NCT Delhi.

== Transport ==
The area lies on a stretch of the National Highway 1, which is part of the historic Grand Trunk Road and the Outer Ring Road of Delhi. It is at a walkable distance from ISBT Kashmere Gate. It is approachable through the Kashmeri Gate station of the Delhi Metro, lies on the Red (New Bus Adda-Rithala), Violet (Escorts Mujesar - Kashmere Gate) and Yellow Lines (Samaypur Badli - HUDA City Centre). It is a transfer station between the Red Line on the highest upper level and the Yellow Line on the lowest level. The Vidhan Sabha metro station is 1.5 km away.
