= Gurdwara Mata Sundri =

Gurdwara in Delhi, India

Gurdwara Mata Sundari

Religion
- Affiliation: Sikhism

Location
- Interactive map of Gurdwara Mata Sundari
- Administration: Delhi Sikh Gurdwara Management Committee

Architecture
- Style: Sikh architecture

Gurdwara Mata Sundri is considered to be one of the major historical Gurudwara of the Sikh; it is a landmark on the Mata Sundri road in the heart of Delhi. It is situated behind JP Nayak Hospital, the Gurudwara is a tribute to Mata Sundri, the wife of the 10th Guru – Guru Gobind Singh.

Mata Sundri was considered to be the first wife of the tenth Guru Gobind Singh (1666–1708). The Delhi Gurdwara Committee constructed an imposing shrine on the site of the Haveli, where Mata Sundri stayed after the departure of the Guru to Deccan While some claim that Sangat (public) raised a shrine in her loving memory on the spot where she lived for half of her life. Most of the Sikhs believe that after the death of Guru Gobind Singh at Nanded in October 1708, she nurtured and guided the Khalsa for forty years after the Guru's death. Sikhs followed her instructions and respected her, looked up to her for guidance. Mata Sundri Kaur left for her heavenly abode in 1747 at this place where now the temple resides and her last rites were performed at the place of Gurdwara Bala Sahib.

== History ==
Mata Sundri was the daughter of Bhai Ram Saran, a Kumarav Khatri of Bijvara, in present-day Hoshiarpur, district of the Punjab. She is alleged to be the same person as Mata Jito, As a child, Sundri was extremely beautiful, so her parents gave her this name according to her looks. Since her father knew Guru Tegh Bahadur, it was then decided that she would marry to Guru Gobind Singh at Anandpur(Punjab)on 4 April 1684 (allegedly). On 26 January 1687, at Paonta, she gave birth to Ajit Singh, the eldest son of Guru Gobind Singh. But due to the battles between Guru Gobind Singh and the Mughal Emperor Aurangzeb, Mata Sundri's son died. Later on it is known that Mata Sundri adopted a child because he resembled to her late son Ajit Singh.

Guru Gobind Singh Ji went to Deccan from Talwandi Sabo (a place in Bathida District of Punjab State), Mata Sundri came to Delhi and stayed at the Haveli (house) of Bhai Jawahar Singh for some time. In 1708, Guru Gobind died at Nanded in October 1708. Some Sikhs believe that Guru Gobind Singh left for his heavenly abode at Nanded (a place in Maharashtra State). From 1727 onwards the holy mother stayed in newly constructed building, then called Mata Sundri's Haveli and now called Mata Sundri's Gurudwara. After which Mata Sundri herself guided the troubled community through this transition, as it is evident from extracted hukumnamas (written orders) issued with her seal and authority between 1717 and 1730. The grateful public raised in her memory a shrine on the spot where she lived half of her life

== Architecture ==
The Temple is built in brick and lime mortar, on the farther end of the hall is a marble-paved gallery. The carved weed beam of the gallery bears an inscription in Gurmukhi script in bold letters. There is a marble slab in the center which surrounded by the inscribed sacred emblem of the Sikhs. It has a standard square-domed sanctums, arched copings and a traditional styled entrance perfectly characterizes the religious structure of Gurudwara Mata Sundri.
