= Mubad =

Indian poet

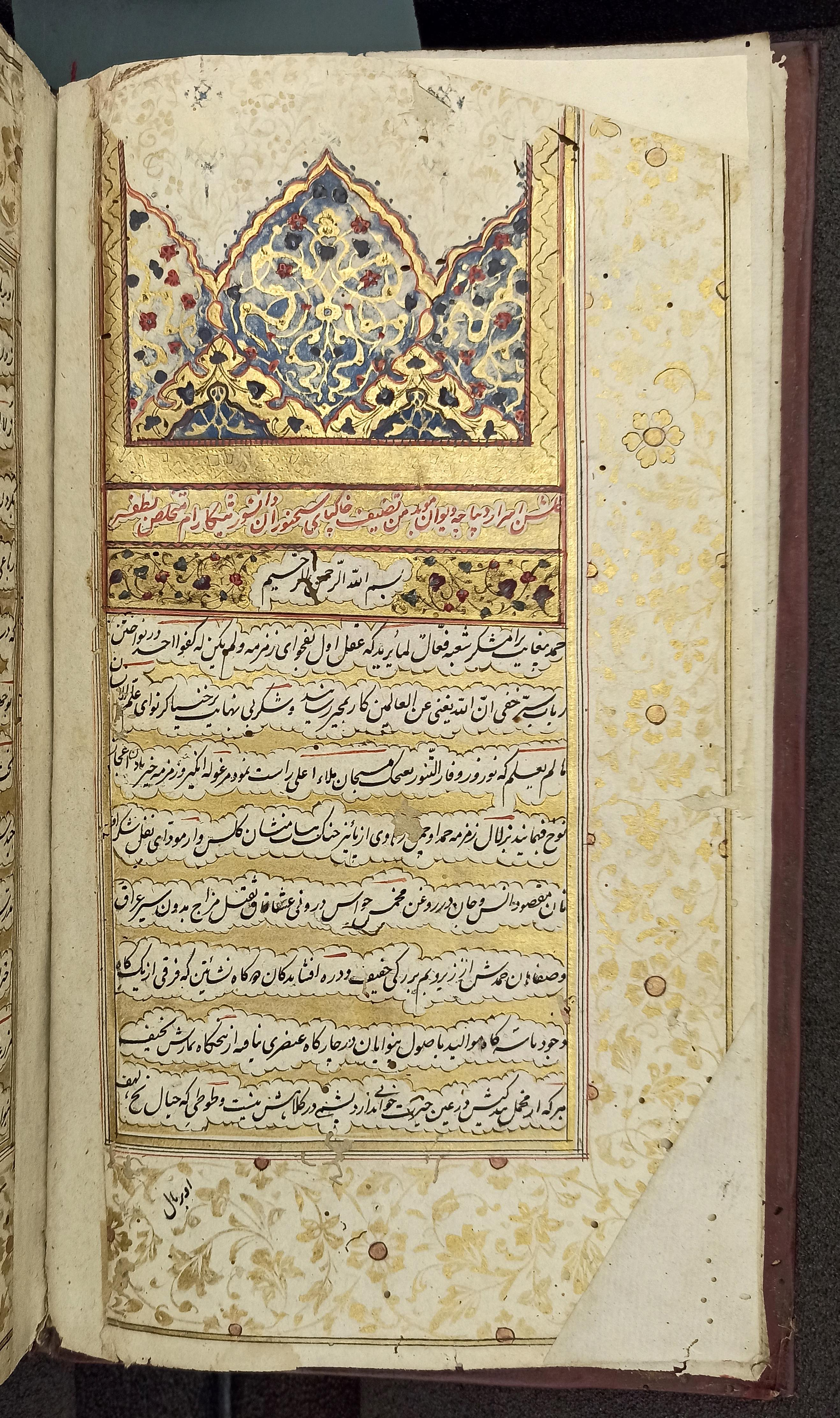
Frontispiece of the Diwān of Mūbad (British Library Or. 324)

Mūbad (موبد) was an Indian poet, originally from Kashmir, who wrote in Persian and settled in Lucknow in the first half of the eighteenth century. Originally called Zindah Rām Pandit, he had two sons, both of whom took service in the court of Shah Alam II. One son, named Sītā-Rām 'Umdah, died in AH 1173. Mūbad himself was a pupil of Mīrzā Girāmī, son of 'Abd al-Ghanī Beg Qabūl. His most famous work is the Diwān-i Mūbad, an extensive collection of poems. The copy in the British Library, registered under the number Or. 324, contains chronograms relating to contemporty events in the reigns of Shah Alam II and Alamgir II. This copy was purchased from the widow of Col. George William Hamilton (1807-1868).
