= Siege of Delhi (1804) =

Siege in the Second Anglo-Maratha War

- Part of the Second Anglo-Maratha War
Date	8–19 October 1804 (1 week, 4 days)
Location	Delhi, India 28°36′45″N 77°17′30″E
Result	Siege abandoned

Belligerents
British Empire: East India Company; Mughal Empire	Maratha Empire: Indore State

Commanders and leaders
David Ochterlony; Gerard Lake; Shah Alam II	Yashwantrao Holkar

Strength
c. 2,500	20,000 men

Casualties and losses
Unknown	296 killed 29 wounded

The siege of Delhi (8–19 October 1804) was conducted by the Maratha leader Maharaja Yashwantrao Holkar against the forces of the British East India Company, who were assisting the Mughals in defending Delhi during the Second Anglo-Maratha War. Holkar's main political objective was to bring the Mughal emperor under his control and thus with force of 60,000 cavalry and 15,000 infantry, Holkar confronted the British commanders Lt. Col.s Ochterlony and Burn who were in charge at Delhi. Ochterlony and Burn defied Holkar's attack with great determination where "The important gates - Ajmeri Gate, Kashmiri Gate, and Lahori Gate - saw stiff fighting." Holkar abandoned the siege after reinforcements led by Gerard Lake arrived on 18 October.
