= Mirza Jawan Bakht (born 1749) =

Mughal prince (1749–1788)

Jahandar Shah II جہاندار شاہ ثانی
- Wali Ahad of the Mughal Empire; Grand Vizier of the Mughal Empire; Shahzada of the Mughal Empire; Mirza
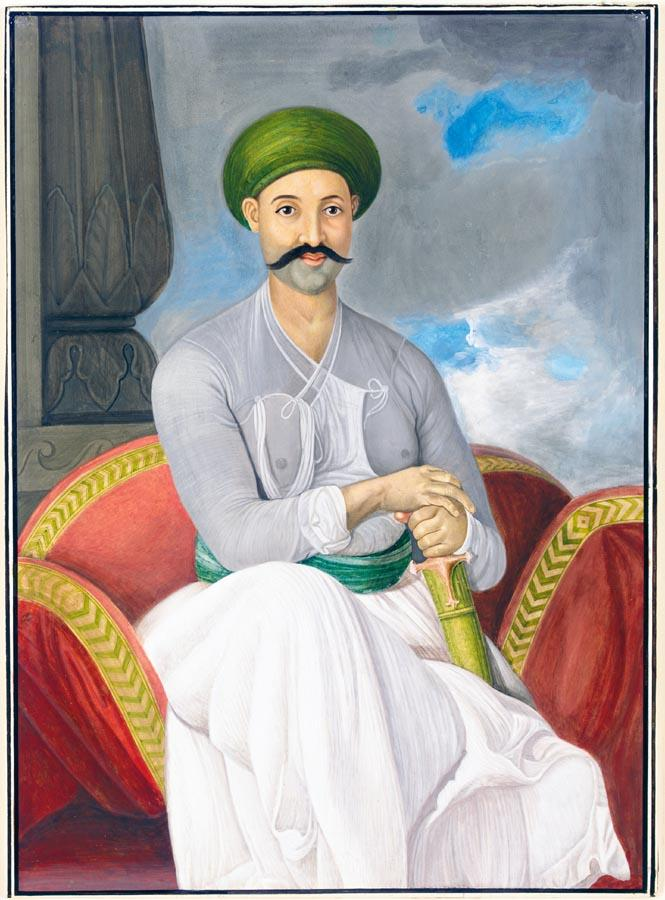
- Portrait by Charles Smith after one by Johan Zoffany, c. 1783

Heir-apparent of the Mughal Empire
- Reign: 1760–1784
- Coronation: 10 October 1760 at Red Fort, Delhi
- Predecessor: Shah Alam II
- Successor: Akbar II
- Born: 1749; Red Fort, Shahjahanabad, Delhi Subah, Maratha Empire (now in Delhi, India)
- Died: 31 May 1788 (aged 38–39); Benares, Awadh Subah, Maratha Empire (modern-day Uttar Pradesh, India)
- Burial: Benares, Oudh State, Mughal Empire (now in Uttar Pradesh, India)
- Spouse: Nawab Mulka-i-Afaq Qutlaq Sultan Begum; Jahanabadi Begum Sahiba; Zeb un-nisa Begum Sahiba; Mahal-i-Khas Sahiba; Halim un-nisa Khanum; Zahar un-nisa Khanum
- Issue: Mirza Muhammad Shagufta Bakht Bahadur; Khurram Bakht Bahadur
Names
- Shahzada Mirza Jawan Bakht Jahandar Shah Bahadur
- House: Mughal dynasty
- Dynasty: Timurid dynasty
- Father: Shah Alam II
- Mother: Nawab Taj Mahal Begum Sahiba
- Religion: Sunni Islam

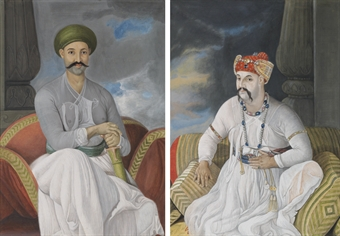
Portrait of The Nawab Vizier Asaf-ud-Daula, seated, full-length; and Portrait of Prince Mirza Jawan Bakht, heir apparent to the Mughal Emperor Shah Alam, seated, full-length

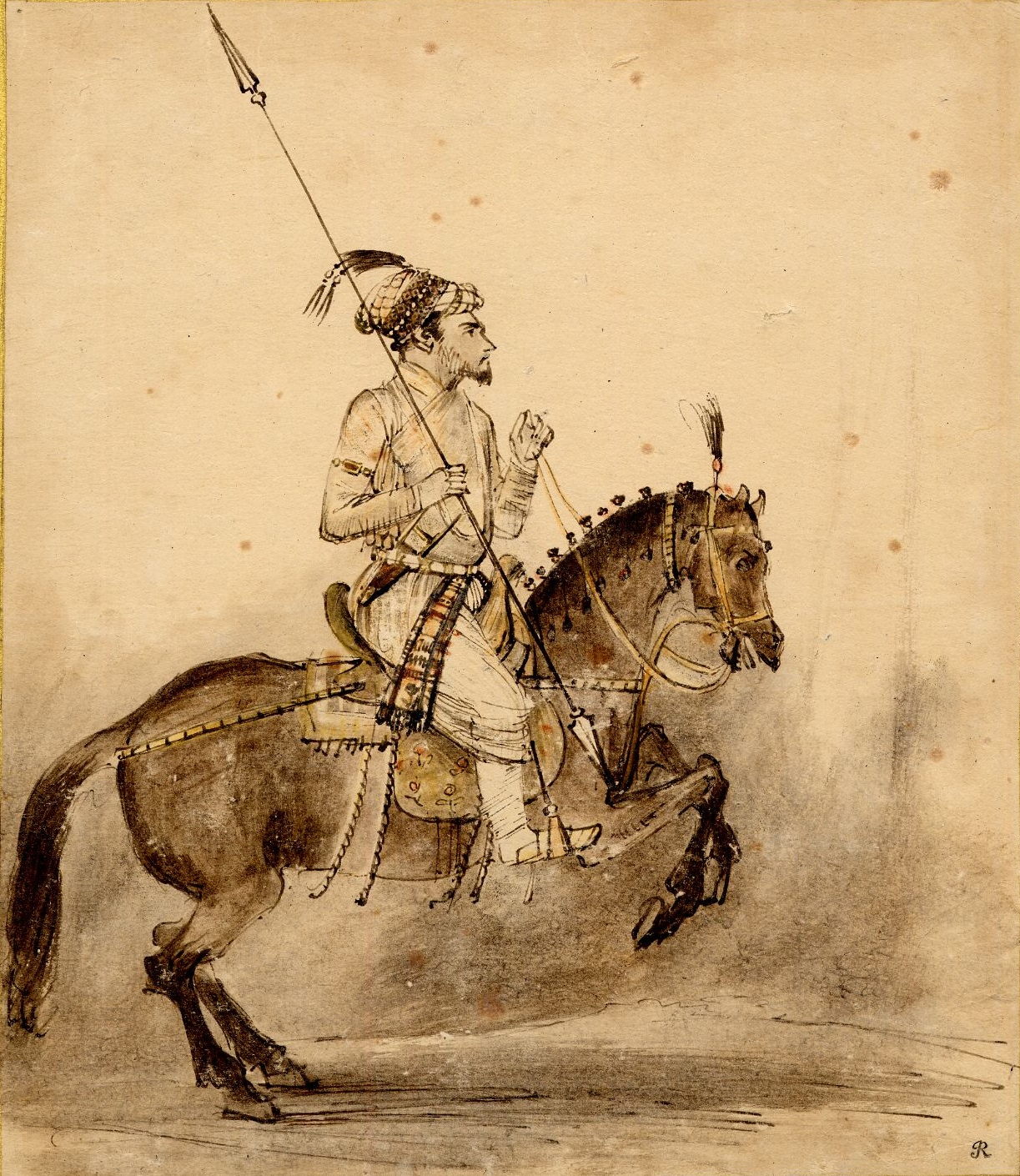
Prince Mirza Jawan Bakht coordinated and commanded various contingents of Mughal troopers, who cut off the supply lines of the Maratha Empire prior to the Third Battle of Panipat.

Shahzada Mirza Jawan Bakht Bahadur (Note: alternative spelling Mirza Javan Bakht, Mirza Jawan Bakht also known as Mirza Jahandar Shah) (Persian, Urdu: شہزادہ مرزا جوان بخت بہادر; 1749 – 31 May 1788 (Note: 25th Shaban 1202 A.H.)) was a Mughal prince and the eldest son of Emperor Shah Alam II and the grandson of Emperor Alamgir II. He was born in 1749 at the Red Fort, Delhi. Jawan Bakht was a very influential Timurid Prince of the Mughal Empire and he also briefly served as the Heir-apparent of the Mughal Empire.

== Early life ==
Prince Mirza Jawan Bakht grew up during very turbulent times in the Mughal Empire, his grandfather's relations with the Maratha backed Grand Vizier Imad-ul-Mulk had begun to worsen as the imperial Nawabs sought to re-centralize the empire.

The Vizier Imad-ul-Mulk was clearly a man of no principles and was commonly criticized for his extreme selfishness. He put all the imperial revenues into his own pocket and starved the Alamgir II's family for three days because Timur Shah Durrani had become the son-in-law of the emperor. Mirza Jawan Bakht often recalled the days he wandered around Delhi begging for food supplies and firewood during those three days.

Angered by the disrespect and arrogance exhibited by Imad-ul-Mulk, Ahmad Shah Durrani set out on another invasion and appointed Najib-ud-Daula as the new Grand Vizier of the Mughal Empire in accordance to the wishes of Alamgir II and Shah Waliullah. Ahmad Shah Durrani then returned to Kabul, while the experienced Najib-ud-Daula consolidated the remains of the Mughal Empire by uniting distant Faujdars, Nawab's and Nizams into a common cause against the Marathas.

Mirza Jawan Bakht was among the Mughal Princes in the service of Najib-ul-Daula, and received military training from his new mentor Hafiz Rahmat Khan.

Fearing the wrath of Ahmad Shah Durrani's new coalition the deposed Imad-ul-Mulk consolidated himself with an old ally the Maratha leader Sadashivrao Bhau and launched a ferocious attack which lasted 15 days and caused the defeat of Najib-ud-Daula and the Mughal Army in the imperial heartlands around Delhi. Najib-ud-Daula conceded defeat and ordered his forces to retreat northwards after being completely overrun.

Things got a lot worse when Imad-ul-Mulk persecuted Mirza Jawan Bakht's activist father Prince Ali Gauhar. When Ali Gauhar realized that Imad-ul-Mulk was planning to have him assassinated he fled eastwards and sought refuge with Ahmad Shah Bangash and Shuja-ud-Daula the Nawab of Awadh.

Imad-ul-Mulk then feared that the Mughal Emperor Alamgir II would recall Ahmad Shah Durrani, or use his son Prince Ali Gauhar, to dispossess him of his newfound power with the Marathas. Therefore, Imad-ul-Mulk plotted to murder the Mughal Emperor Alamgir II and his family. In November, 1759, the Mughal Emperor Alamgir II was told that a pious man had come to meet him, Alamgir II, ever so eager to meet holy men, set out immediately to meet him at Kotla Fateh Shah, he was stabbed repeatedly by Imad-ul-Mulk's assassins. The Mughal Emperor Alamgir II's death was mourned throughout the Mughal Empire.

== Shah Jahan III the usurper ==
After the assassination of Alamgir II in 1759, the Peshwa under the sway of Sadashivrao Bhau had reached the peak of its short-lived power particularly when their involvement in the assassination had become eminent when he discussed abolishing the Mughal Empire and placing Vishwasrao on the throne in Delhi by bribing or deposing Imad-ul-Mulk.

However, Sadashivrao Bhau then personally chose Shah Jahan III as the new Mughal Emperor and began a campaign of plundering the Jewels and ornaments of the Mughal imperial court, he also defaced mosques, tombs and shrines that the Mughals had built in Agra and Delhi, he then desecrated the imperial Moti Masjid and looted its exquisite jeweled decorations into booty for the ravaging Marathas. Sadashivrao Bhau's domination over the Mughal Empire had a profound impact on the divided and degenerative Muslim aristocracy and hierarchy, many began to look up to Ahmad Shah Durrani as their savior.

Mirza Jawan Bakht is known to have witnessed the looting and this event completely changed his opinion regarding the legitimacy and the immoral authoritarianism of the Maratha renegades.

== Third Battle of Panipat ==
Prince Mirza Jawan Bakht coordinated and commanded various contingents of Mughal troopers, who cut off the supply lines of the Marathas prior to the Third Battle of Panipat and eventually overthrew the usurping Jahan Shah III after the victory of the coalition of Ahmad Shah Durrani and proclaimed Shah Alam II as the rightful ruler of the Mughal Empire

== Mirza Jawan Bakht regent of the Mughal Empire ==
After the Battle of Buxar, Shah Alam II's absence from Delhi meant that his son Prince Mirza Jawan Bakht and Najib-ul-Daula, were the actual representatives of the emperor for the next 12 years. As the Administrator of Delhi and the imperial heartlands including Agra, Najib-ul-Daula, was unprepared to halt the Jat peasant uprisings led by the deviant Suraj Mal. During one massive assault Jat renegades and their leaders overran the Mughal garrison at Agra they plundered the city and the two great silver doors to the entrance of the famous Taj Mahal were looted and thoughtlessly melted down by Suraj Mal in 1764. Since then many Mughal Faujdars and commanders such as Sayyad Muhammad Khan Baloch vowed to avenge the ruins of the Mughal Empire caused by the tyrannical Jat's and during an ingenious counterattack Suraj Mal was defeated and executed by the Mughal Army.

The Jats then sacked Jaipur and invited the Marathas in 1766, Ahmad Shah Abdali tried to reinforce Delhi by organizing another campaign against the Sikhs, who killed Zain Khan Sirhindi, the Sikh renegades were ultimately defeated by the Durrani forces.

In the year 1768 the Marathas pillaged Bharatpur, and the Mughal Army began to crumble once again mainly due to the death of Najib-ul-Daula. Mirza Jawan Bakht and Hafiz Rahmat Khan never trusted Najib-ul-Daula's manipulative son Zabita Khan, who was often compared with the unpopular Imad-ul-Mulk.

== Arrival of Shah Alam II ==
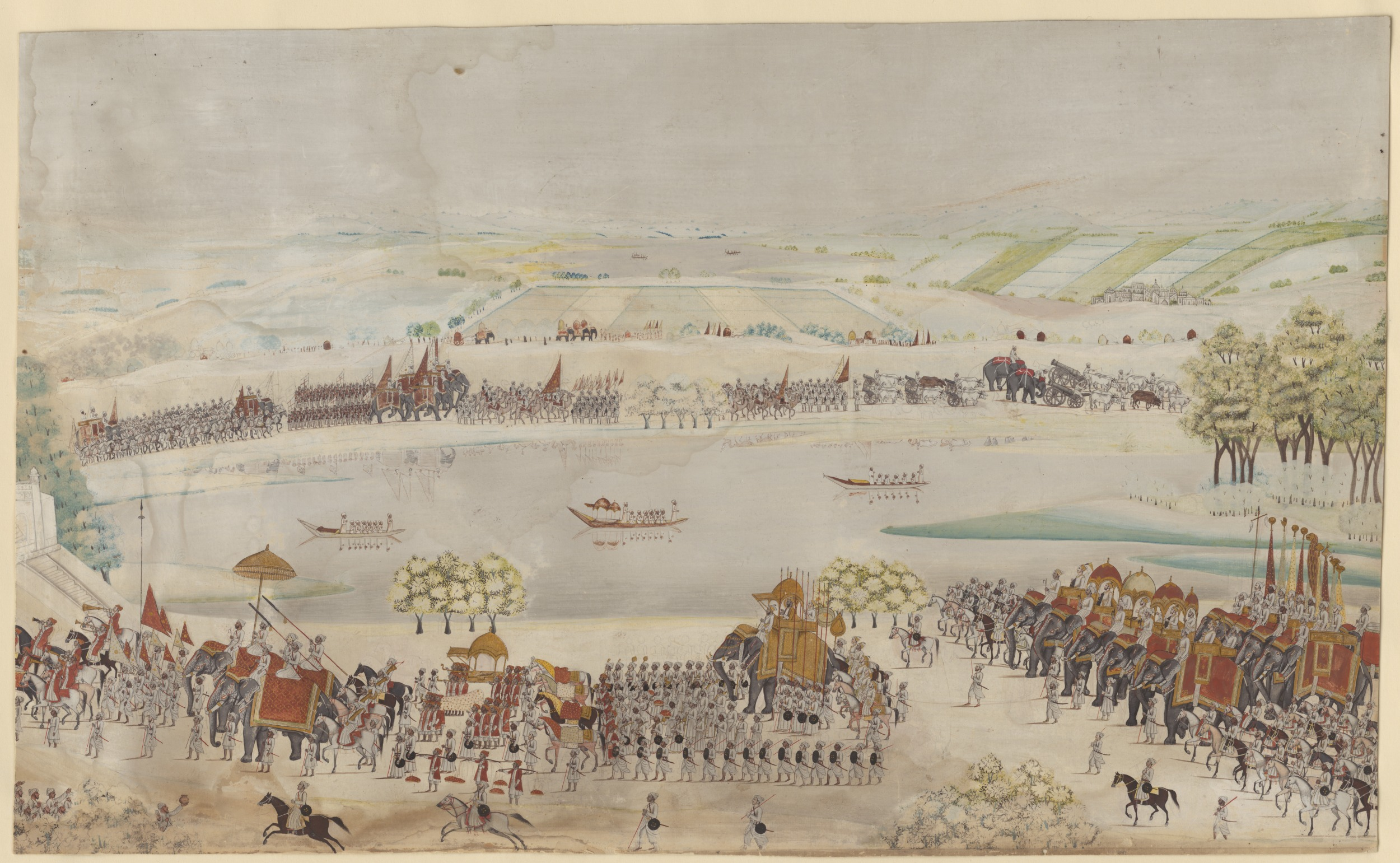
The Mughal Army of Shah Alam II arrives in Delhi.

Soon after the emperor's arrival in Delhi, Zabita Khan began to align himself with Jat rebels and in response to this particular alliance Mirza Najaf Khan, Mirza Jawan Bakht and his armies attacked Zabita Khan, who fled from his position and the chief of the Rohillas, but was restored once again after negotiating peace with Shah Alam II. Zabita Khan caused even greater tribulations when he intentionally attacked and provoked the weakened Marathas, who then overran and set ablaze a large portion of Rohilkhand and captured Najafgarh. The Marathas were defeated soon after at Asadpur, when Hafiz Rahmat Khan successfully gained reinforcements by his longtime ally by Shuja-ud-Daula, together their combined forces expelled the Marathas out of Rohilkhand and Delhi also.

=== Mirza Jawan Bakht, champion of the new Mughal Army ===
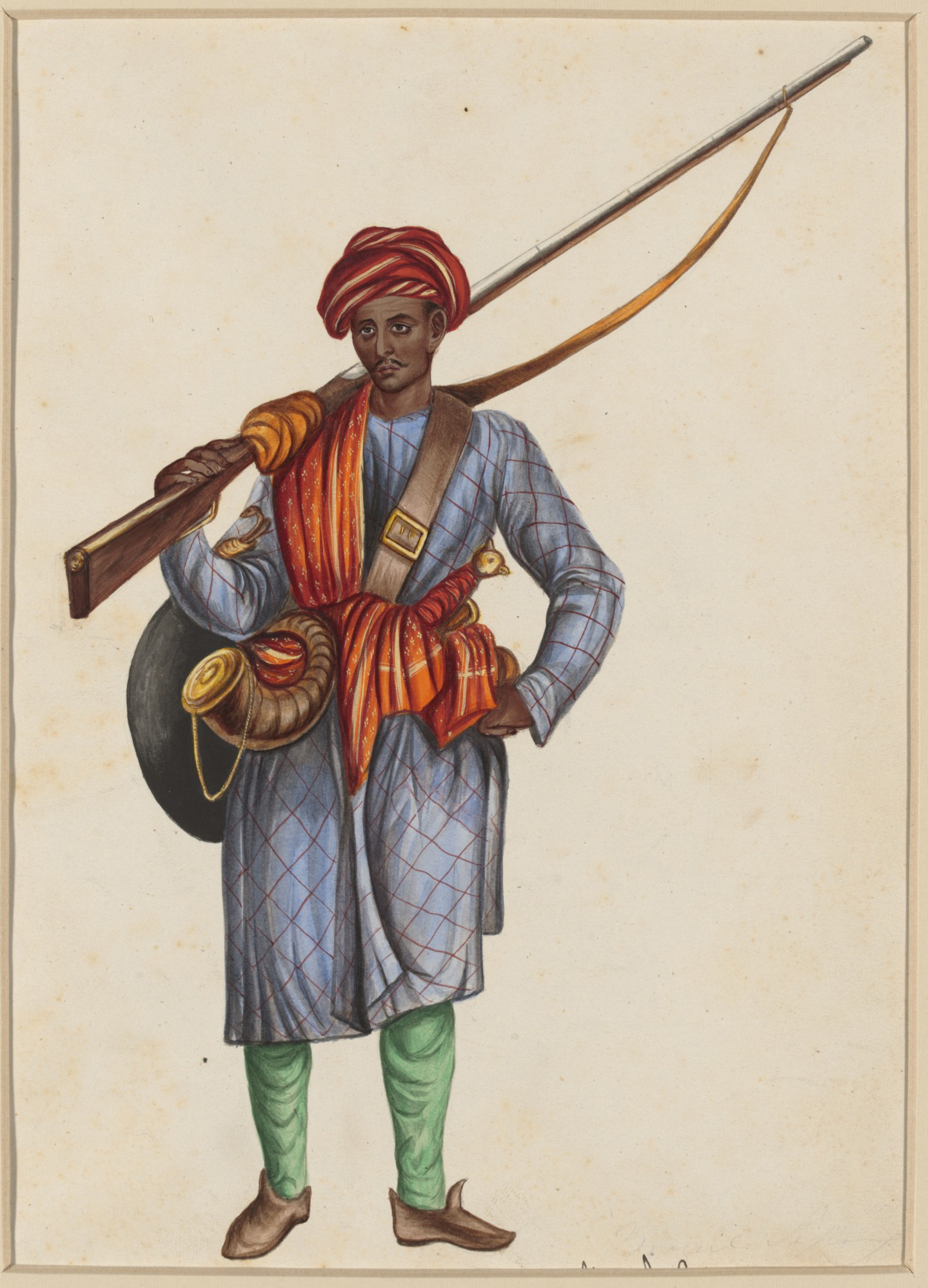
A Mughal infantryman, under the command of Mirza Najaf Khan, well capable of defending the Mughal Empire.

One of his first acts was to strengthen and raise a new Mughal Army, under the command of Mirza Najaf Khan capable of defending the Mughal Empire. This new army consisted of infantrymen who successfully utilized both Flintlocks and Talwars in combat formations, they utilized elephants for transportation and were less dependent on artillery and cavalry. Mirza Najaf Khan is also known to have introduced the more-effective Firelock muskets through his collaboration with Mir Qasim, the Nawab of Bengal.

The new Mughal Army carried the standard of Mirza Jawan Bakht, and soon controlled a vast territory that stretched from the Satluj Valley in the west to the territories around Allahabad in the east, from Srinagar in the north to Gwalior in the south, however times were troubled and the Mughal Empire was surrounded by enemies on every side.

=== Coup by Ghulam Qadir ===
After Prince Mirza Jawan Bakht's fruitless attempts to halt Ghulam Qadir and his renegade forces, Ghulam Qadir with his renegade Sikh and Hindu allies entered the imperial palace and forced Shah Alam II to appoint him as the Grand Vizier of the Mughal Empire. Petty, avaricious and insane the eunuch ravaged the palaces in search of the Mughal treasure believed to be worth Rs 250 million. Unable to locate even a fraction of that sum and angered by the Mughal Emperor's attempts to eliminate him and his Sikh allies, Ghulam Qadir had Shah Alam II blinded on August 10, 1788. A drunken ruffian, Ghulam Qadir behaved with gross brutality to the emperor and his family. Three servants and two water-carriers who tried to help the bleeding emperor were beheaded and according to one account, Ghulam Qadir would pull the beard of the elderly Mughal Emperor Shah Alam II. After ten horrible weeks, during which Ghulam Qadir stripped the princesses of the royal family naked and forced them to dance naked before him (after which they jumped into Yamuna river to drown) and the honour of the royal family and prestige of the Mughal Empire reached its lowest ebb, Mahadaji Shinde intervened and killed Ghulam Qadir, taking possession of Delhi on 2 October 1788.

Unable to gather any assistance from his cousin Zaman Shah Durrani and isolated by the subjects of Shah Alam II, Mirza Jawan Bakht refused to ally himself with the powerful Maratha chieftain Mahadaji Shinde, the Mughal Prince suddenly died mortified in May 1788, while gathering relief forces in Agra.

== See also ==
- Alamgir II
- Shah Alam II
- Third Battle of Panipat
