= Shah Alam II =

Mughal emperor (r. 1760–1788, 1788–1806)

Shah Alam II شاه عالم دوم
- Padishah; Al-Sultan Al-Azam
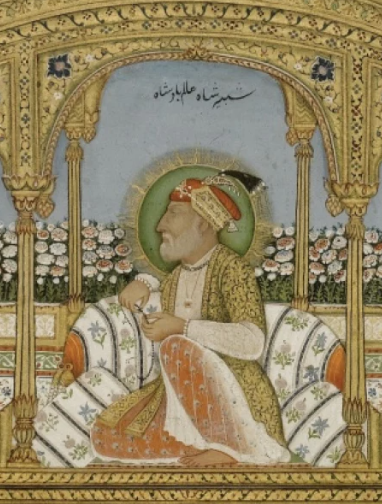
- Shah Alam after his blinding, by Khairallah c. 1793

Mughal emperor
- First reign: 10 October 1760 – 31 July 1788
- Predecessor: Shah Jahan III
- Successor: Jahan Shah
- Second reign: 16 October 1788 – 19 November 1806
- Predecessor: Jahan Shah
- Successor: Akbar II
- Born: Mirza Ali Gauhar; 25 June 1728; Shahjahanabad, Delhi Subah, Mughal Empire (present-day Old Delhi, Delhi, India)
- Died: 19 November 1806 (aged 78); Shahjahanabad, Delhi Subah, Maratha Empire
- Burial: Moti Masjid, Mehrauli, Delhi, India
- Spouses: Taj Mahal; Jamil-un-Nissa Begum; Mubarak Mahal; Murad Bakht Begum; Qudsia Begum; Azizan, Malika-i-Alam; Shahabadi Mahal; Nawab Mahal; Nazakat Mahal
- Issue: Akbar II; Mirza Jahandar Shah; Mirza Jahan Shah, Farkhunda Akhtar; Mirza Sulaiman Shikoh; Mirza Sikandar Shikoh; Mirza Izzat Baksh; Mirza Jamshed Bakht; Begum Jan Begum; Aziz-un-Nissa Begum; Rufa-ul-Nissa Begum; Aliat-un-Nissa Begum; Saadat-un-Nissa Begum; Akbarabadi Begum; Dil Afroz Banu Begum
Names
- 'Abdu'llah Jalal ud-din Abu'l Muzaffar Hamid ud-din Muhammad 'Mirza Ali Gauhar Shah-i-'Alam II (عبدالله جلال الدین ابوالمظفر هم الدین محمد میرزا علی گوهر شاه علم دوم)
- House: Mughal dynasty
- Dynasty: Timurid dynasty
- Father: Alamgir II
- Mother: Zinat Mahal
- Religion: Sunni Islam (Hanafi)
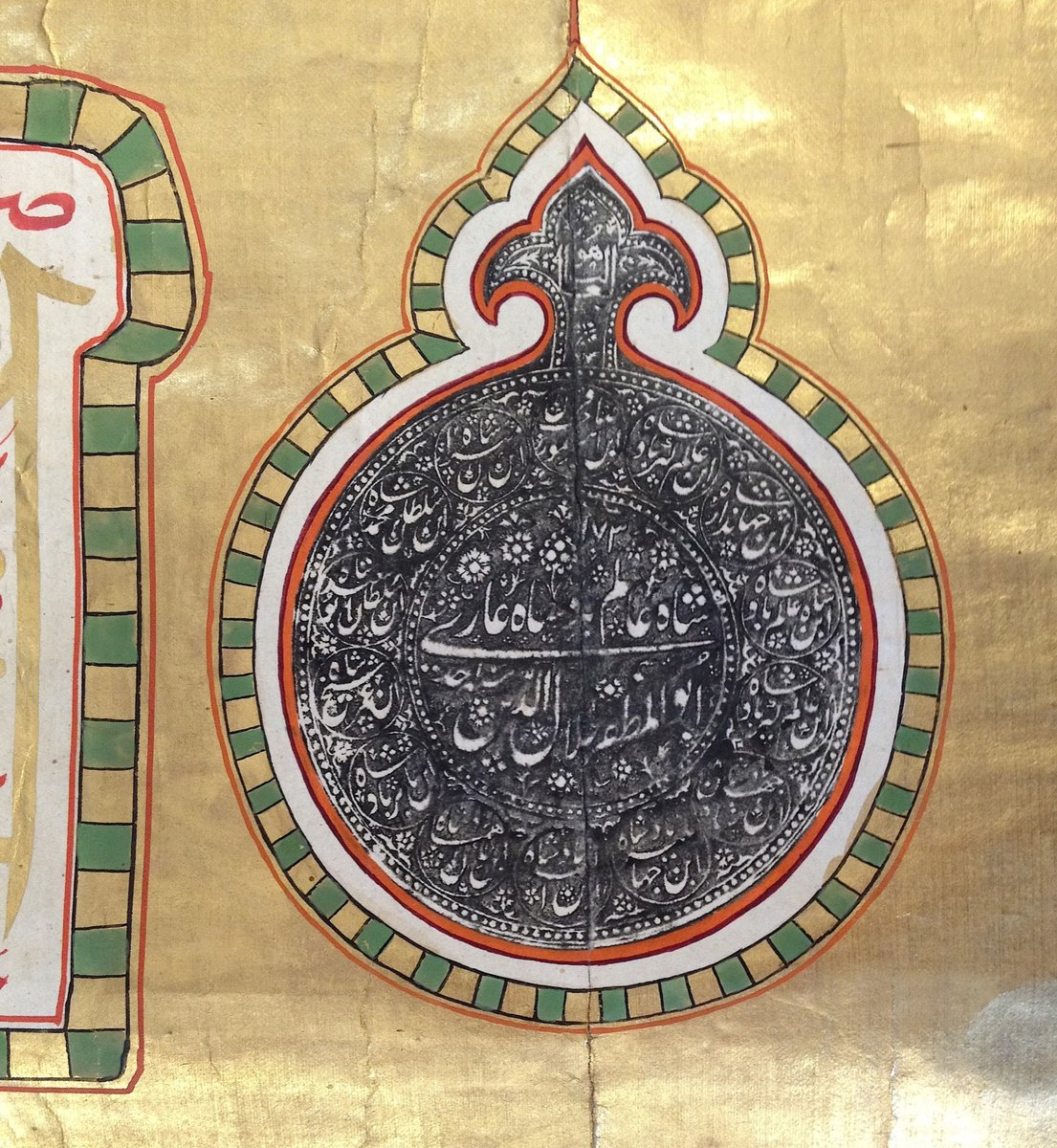
- Seal
- Military career
- Conflicts: Third Battle of Panipat; Bengal War; Battle of Delhi (1764); Battle of Buxar; Battle of Delhi (1771); Battle of Purana Qila; Battle of Delhi (1783); Capture of Delhi (1788); Siege of Delhi (1804)

Shah Alam II (Persian: شاه عالم دوم, Persian pronunciation: [ʃɑːh ʔɑː.ˈlam]; 25 June 1728 – 19 November 1806), also known by his birth name Ali Gohar, or Ali Gauhar, was the seventeenth Mughal emperor and the son of Alamgir II.

The reign of Shah Alam saw a number of invasions, the first and foremost by Ahmed Shah Abdali in 1761, which led to the third battle of Panipat between the Maratha Empire and the Afghans under Abdali. The invading forces of Abdali then drove out the Marathas led by Sadashivrao Bhau, deposed Shah Jahan III, the puppet Mughal emperor of Imad-ul-Mulk, and installed Shah Alam II as the rightful emperor (1760 – 1772).

Despite his rightful claims to the throne, Shah Alam II was unable to return to Delhi until 1772, under the protection of Mahadaji Scindia of Gwalior. He fought against the East India Company at the Battle of Buxar (1764), and was forced to grant the British the rights to collect taxes in Bengal, Bihar and Orissa. During his reign the Mughal authority saw a brief revival in northern India under the capable general Mirza Najaf Khan, but after his death in 1782, the Mughal power collapsed for one last time. In 1788, when Shah Alam was a prisoner of Ghulam Qadir, he was blinded. His power was so depleted during his later reign that it led to a saying in the Persian language, 'The empire of Shah Alam is from Delhi to Palam' (Persian: سلطنت شاه عالم، از دهلی تا پالم, saltanat-e-šâh âlam, az dihli tâ pâlam), Palam being a suburb of Delhi. In 1803 the British captured Delhi after their victory in the Second Anglo-Maratha War, with Shah Alam becoming their pensioner.

Shah Alam II authored his own Diwan of poems and was known by the pen-name Aftab. His poems were guided, compiled and collected by Mirza Fakhir Makin. He also composed the Ajaib-ul-Qasas, which is considered one of the earliest and most prominent books of prose in Urdu.

== Early life ==
Ali Gohar was born to Shahzada (Prince) Aziz-ud-Din, son of the deposed Mughal Emperor Jahandar Shah, on 25 June 1728. Alongside his father, he grew up in semi-captivity in the Salatin quarters of the Red Fort. However, unlike the majority of Mughal princes growing up in similar circumstances, he is not recorded to have become a decadent prince by the time his father became emperor, and therefore was naturally given high appointments in the course of his father's reign.

Upon his father's accession, he became the Wali al-Ahd (Crown Prince) of the empire, and became his father's principal agent, though almost all power lay in the Wazir Imad-ul-Mulk's hand. His quarrels with that amir, and fear for his own life, caused him to flee from Delhi in 1758.

=== Escape from Delhi ===
Prince Ali Gauhar, afterwards Emperor Shah Alam II, had been the heir apparent of his father Alamgir II. Prince Ali Gauhar's father had been appointed Mughal Emperor by Vizier Imad-ul-Mulk and Maratha Peshwa's cousin Sadashivrao Bhau.

Prince Ali Gauhar organized a militia and made a daring escape from Delhi. He appeared in the Eastern Subah in 1759, hoping to strengthen his position by attempting to regain control over Bengal, Bihar and Odisha.

Very soon however, Najib-ud-Daula forced the usurper Imad-ul-Mulk to flee from the capital by gathering a large Mughal Army outside Delhi. He used the army to depose the recreant Shah Jahan III. Najib-ud-Daula and Muslim nobles then planned to defeat the Marathas by maintaining correspondence with the powerful Ahmad Shah Durrani. After Durrani decisively defeated the Marathas, he nominated Ali Gauhar as the emperor under the name Shah Alam II.

=== Bengal War ===
In 1760, after Shah Alam's militia gained control over pockets in Bengal, Bihar and parts of Odisha, Prince Ali Gauhar and his Mughal Army of 30,000 intended to overthrow Mir Jafar and Imad-ul-Mulk as they tried to capture or kill him by advancing towards Awadh and Patna in 1759. But the conflict soon involved the intervention of the assertive East India Company.

The Mughals clearly intended to recapture their breakaway Eastern Subah led by Prince Ali Gauhar, who was accompanied by a Militia consisting of persons like Muhammad Quli Khan, Kadim Husein, Kamgar Khan, Hidayat Ali, Mir Afzal and Ghulam Husain Tabatabai. Their forces were reinforced by the forces of Shuja-ud-Daula, Najib-ud-Daula and Ahmad Khan Bangash. The Mughals were also joined by Jean Law and 200 Frenchmen and waged a campaign against the British during the Seven Years' War.

Prince Ali Gauhar successfully advanced as far as Patna, which he later besieged with a combined army of over 40,000 in order to capture or kill Ramnarian, a sworn enemy of the Mughals. Mir Jafar was in terror at the near demise of his cohort and sent his own son Miran to relieve Ramnarian and retake Patna. Mir Jafar also implored the aid of Robert Clive, but it was Major John Caillaud, who dispersed Prince Ali Gauhar's army in 1761 after four major battles including Battle of Patna, Battle of Sirpur, Battle of Birpur and Battle of Siwan.

After negotiations assuring peace Shah Alam II was escorted by the British to meet Mir Qasim the new Nawab of Bengal, who was nominated after the sudden death of Miran. Mir Qasim soon had the Mughal Emperor's investiture as Subedar of Bengal, Bihar and Odisha, and agreed to pay an annual revenue of 2.4 million dam. Shah Alam II then retreated to Allahabad and was protected by the Shuja-ud-Daula, the Nawab of Awadh from 1761 until 1764. Meanwhile, Mir Qasim's relations with the East India company began to worsen. He initiated reforms that withdrew the tax exemptions enjoyed by the East India Company, he also ousted Ramnarian and created firelock manufacturing factories at Patna with the sole purpose of improving the newly reformed Mughal Army.

Angered by these developments, the East India Company sought to oust Mir Qasim. Court intrigues encouraged by the East India Company forced Mir Qasim to leave Bengal, Bihar and Odisha. Mir Qasim on his part encouraged Shuja-ud-Daula the Nawab of Awadh and Shah Alam II to engage the British.

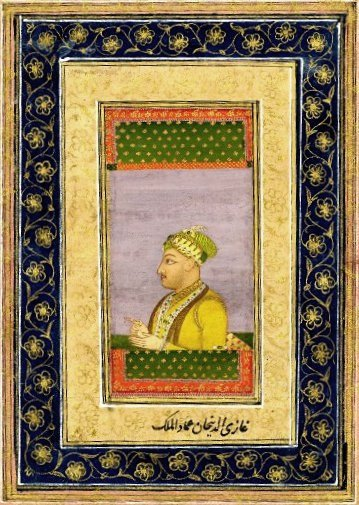
Imad-ul-Mulk was the regent imposed by the Maratha Confederacy in 1757, who assassinated Alamgir II and prominent members of the imperial family, within the Maratha controlled city of Delhi; Shah Alam II managed to escape to safety with the Nawab of Awadh.

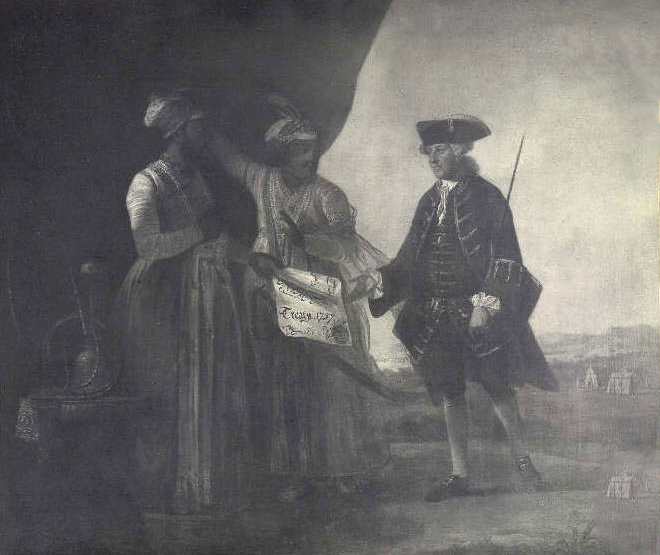
Mir Jafar, his son Miran and Ramnarian refused to submit to Shah Alam II, who initiated the Bengal War causing the eventual intervention of the East India Company.

== Emperor from Allahabad ==
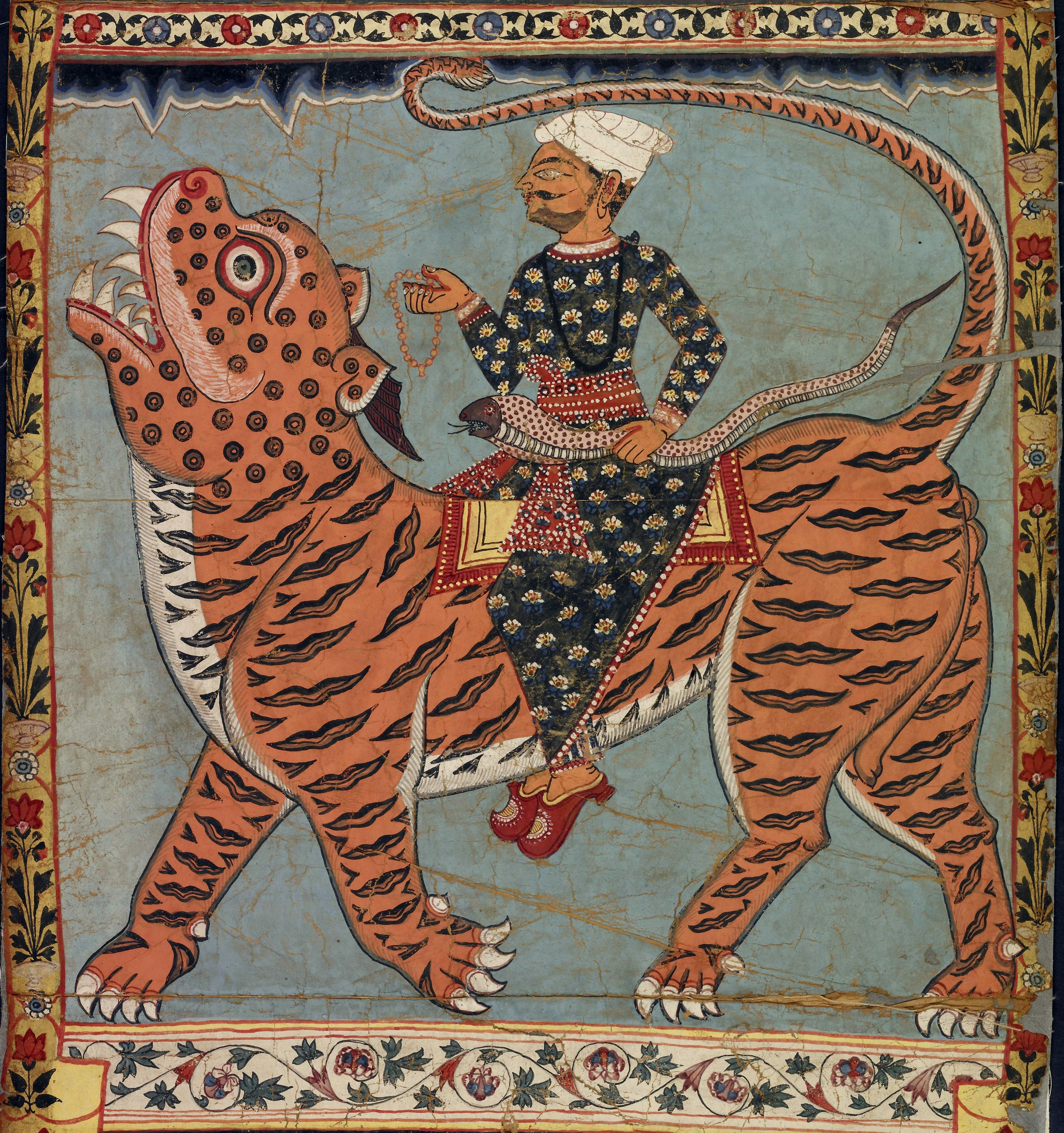
Mughal era illustration of Pir Ghazi of Bengal, during the 18th century.

Shah Alam II was acknowledged as the emperor by the Durrani Empire. His rule extended to the 24 Parganas of the Sundarbans, Mir Qasim, Nawab of Bengal and Murshidabad (and Bihar),Raja of Banares, Nizam of Hyderabad, Nawab of Ghazipur, Sultan of Mysore, Nawab of Kadapa and Nawab of Kurnool, Nawab of the Carnatic of Arcot and Nellore, Raja of Kashmir, Nawab of Junagarh, Nawab of Rohilkhand of Lower Doab and Upper Doab, and Nawab of Bahawalpur.

=== Battle of Buxar ===
The Battle of Buxar was fought on 22 October 1764 between the combined armies of Mir Qasim, the Nawab of Bengal; Shuja-ud-Daula the Nawab of Awadh; the Mughal Emperor Shah Alam II and the forces under the command of the East India Company led by Hector Munro. The battle was fought at Buxar, a town located on the bank of the Ganges river then within the territory of Bengal, and was a decisive victory for the East India Company.

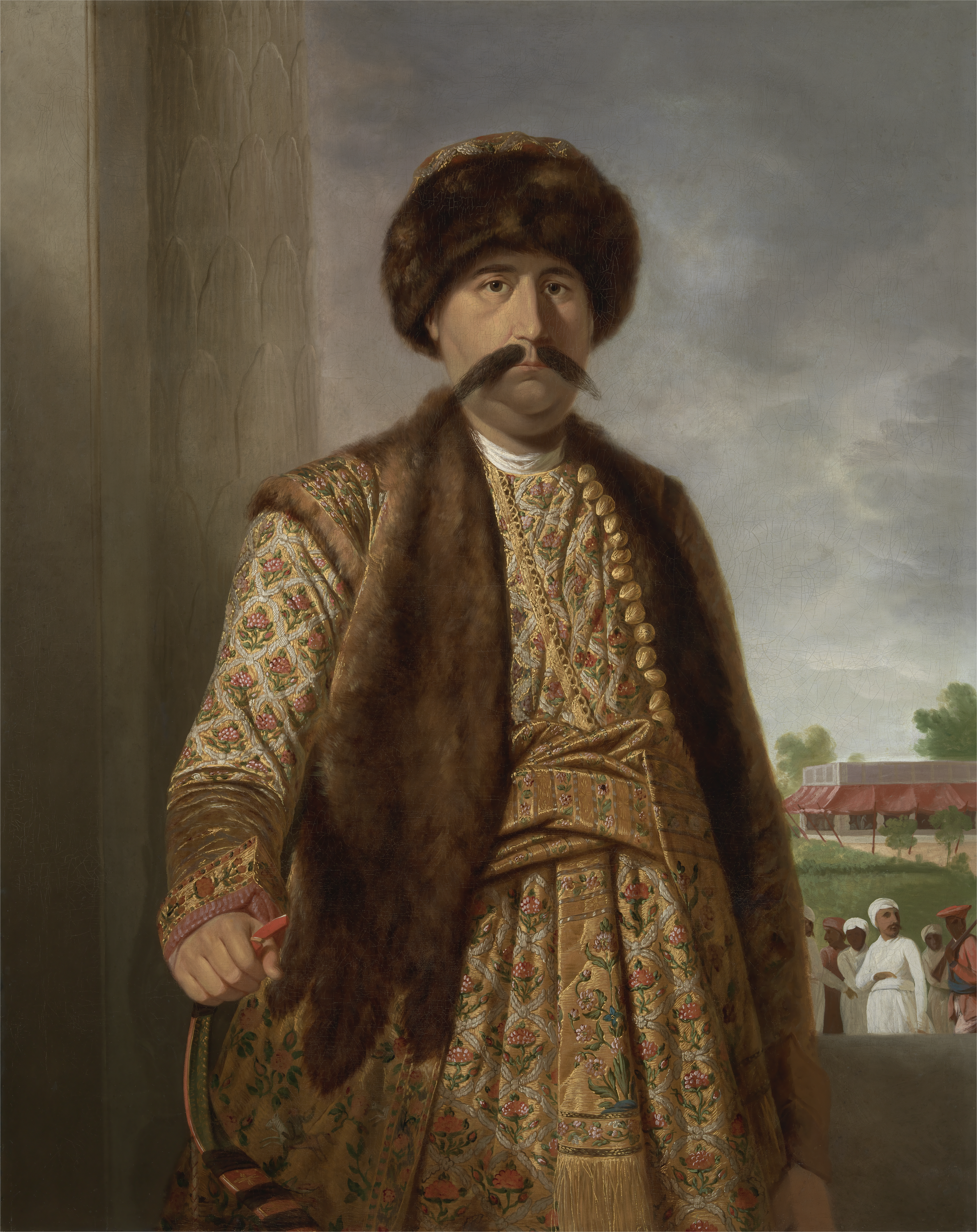
Shuja-ud-Daula served as the leading Nawab Vizier of the Mughal Empire, during the Third Battle of Panipat and the Battle of Buxar

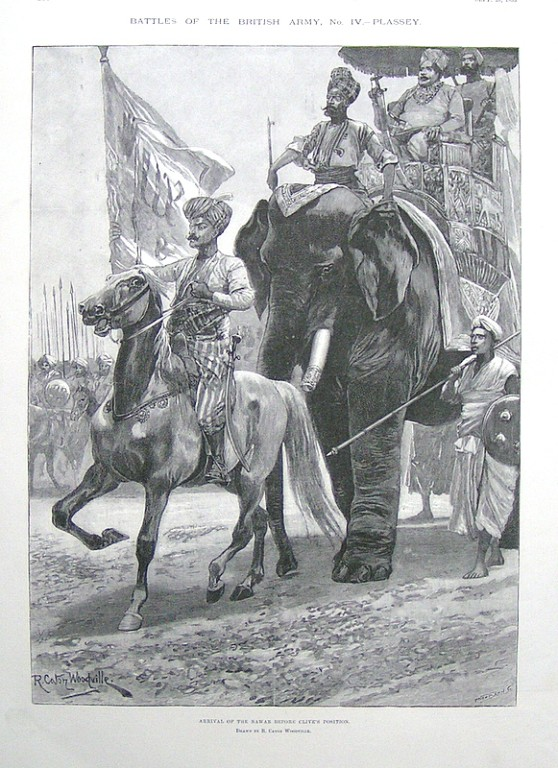
Nawab of Bengal, Mir Qasim defected to Shah Alam II.

=== Treaty of Allahabad ===
Soon after the Battle of Buxar, Shah Alam II, a sovereign who had just been defeated by the British, sought their protection by signing the Treaty of Allahabad in the year 1765. Shah Alam II was forced to grant the Diwani (right to collect revenue) of Bengal (which included Bihar and Odisha) to the East India Company in return for an annual tribute of 2.6 million rupees to be paid by the company from the collected revenue. Tax exemption status was also restored to the company. The company further secured the districts of Kora and Allahabad which allowed the East India Company to collect tax from more than 20 million people. The East India Company thus became the Imperial tax collector in the former Mughal province of Bengal. The Company appointed a deputy, Nawab Muhammad Reza Khan to collect revenue on their behalf.

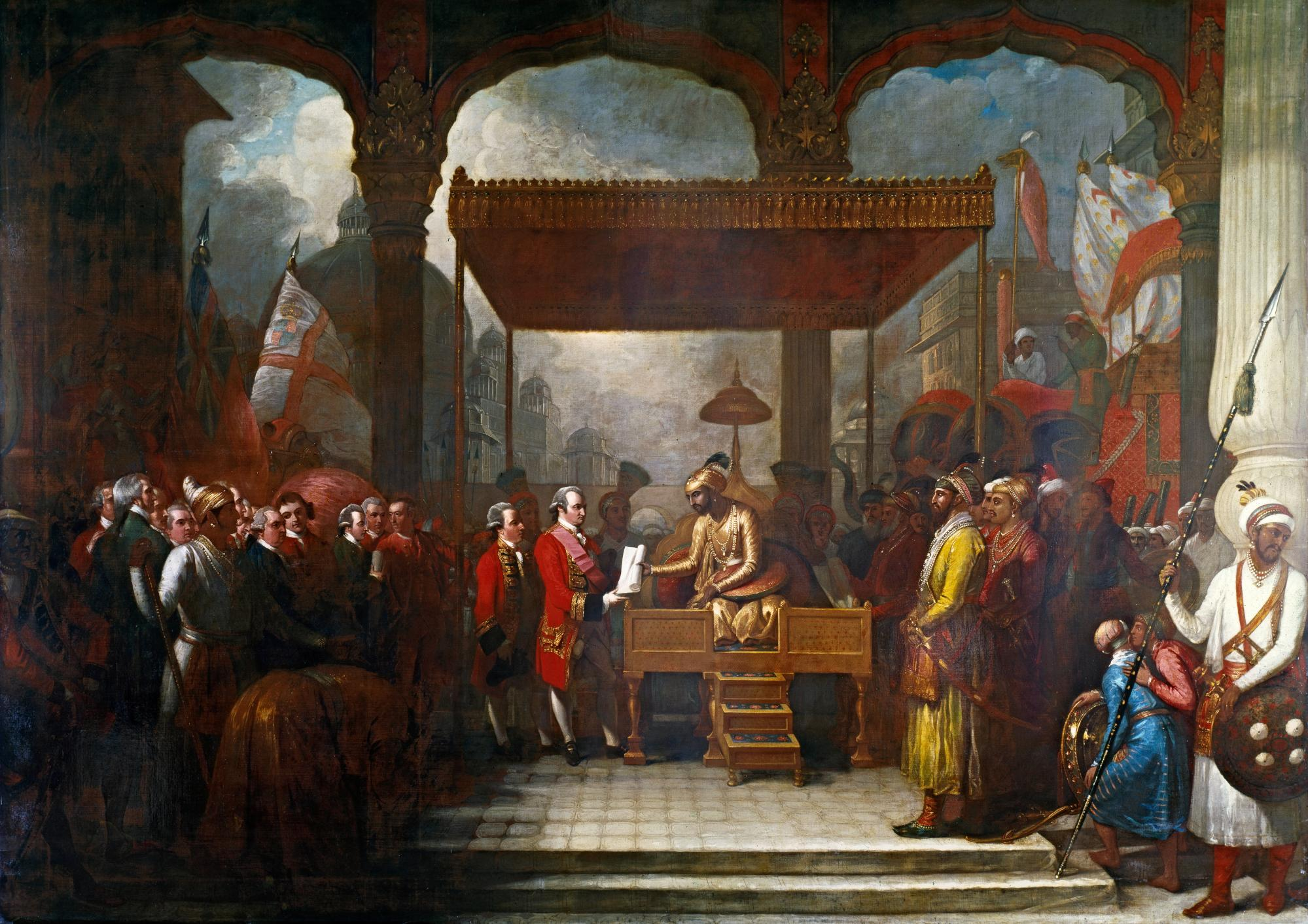
Shah Alam II granting Robert Clive the "Diwani rights of Bengal, Behar and Odisha" in return for the annexed territories of the Nawab of Awadh after the Battle of Buxar, on 12 August 1765 at the Benares.

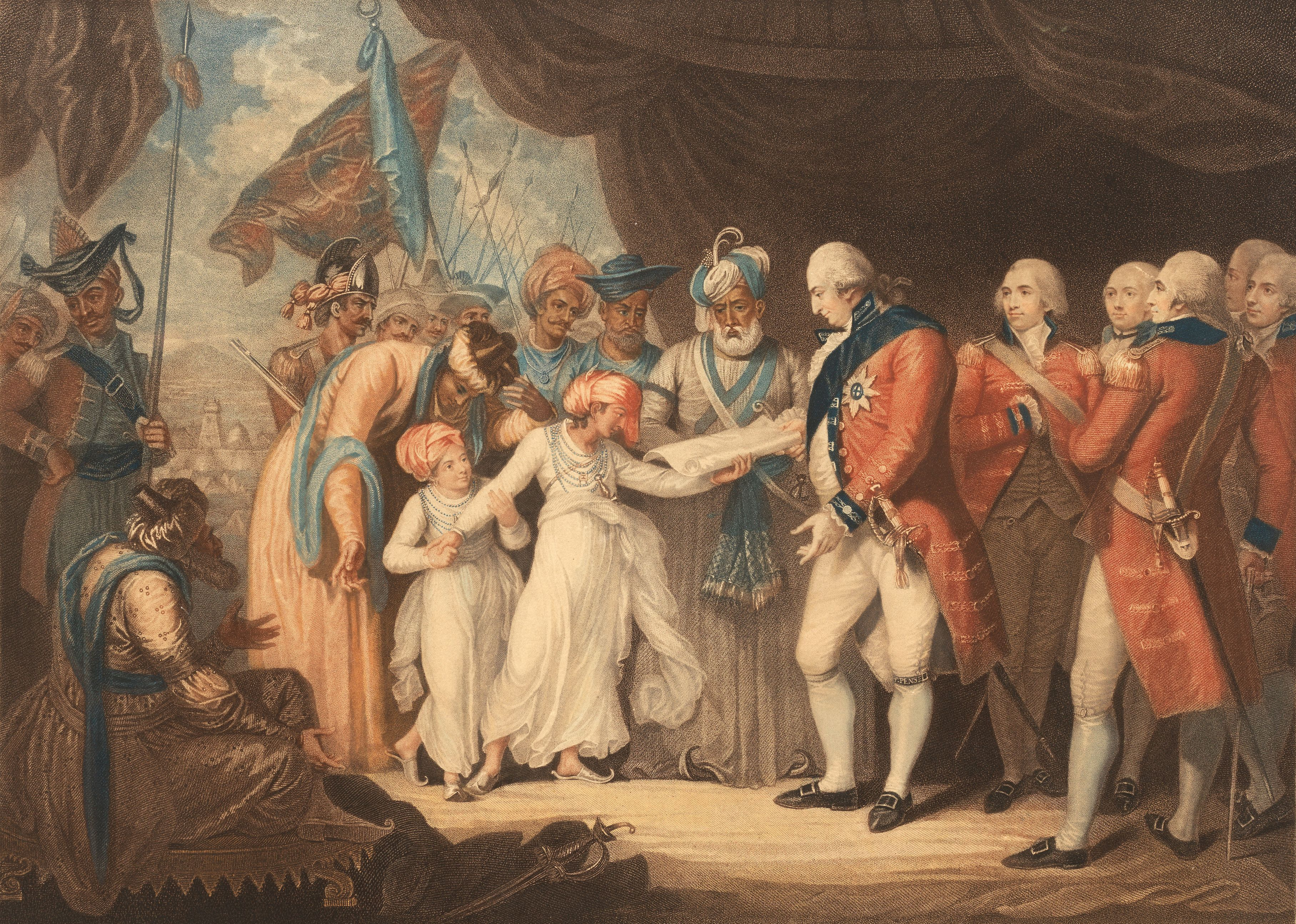
Wallajah was a very influential subject of the "Great Mogul" he was friendly attitude towards the British East India Company, he was well known and his influence widespread throughout the country. (Here he is seen as witness that two of Tipu Sultan sons being taken hostage to Vellore, during the Third Anglo-Mysore War).

=== Absence from Delhi ===
Shah Alam II's absence from Delhi was due to the terms of the treaty he had signed with the British. But his son and heir apparent Prince Mirza Jawan Bakht and Najib-ul-Daula, represented the emperor for the next 12 years in Delhi.

== Return to Delhi ==
Shah Alam II resided in the fort of Allahabad for six years. Warren Hastings, the head of East India Company got appointed as the first Governor of Bengal in 1774. This was the period of "Dual rule" where East India Company enacted laws to maximise collection of revenue and the Mughal Emperor appointed Nawab looked after other affairs of the province. East India Company later discontinued the tribute of 2.6 million Rupees and later also handed over the districts of Allahabad and Kora to the Nawab of Awadh. These measures amounted to a repudiation of the company's vassalage to the emperor as Diwan (tax collector). In 1793 East India Company was strong enough and abolished Nizamat (local rule) completely and annexed Bengal. Weakened Shah Alam II agreed to the consultation of the East India Company, who advised him never to trust the Marathas.

In the year 1771 the Marathas under Mahadaji Scindia returned to northern India and even captured Delhi. Shah Alam II, was escorted by Mahadaji Scindia and left Allahabad in May 1771 and in January 1772 reached Delhi. Along with the Marathas they undertook to win the crown lands of Rohilkhand and defeated Zabita Khan, capturing the fort of Pathargarh with its treasure. The emperor returned to the throne in Delhi in 1772, under the protection of Mahadaji Scindia of Gwalior. The emperor became a client of the Gwalior State whose Peshwa demanded tribute, which the Moguls are known to have paid so as to avoid any further conflict with the Confederacy. Later conflict arose between Shah Alam and Mahadaji over the spoils captured from defeating Rohillas. Mahadaji besieged Delhi and bombarded the fort itself. However he was forced to abandon siege and go back to Pune after receiving the news of the death of Peshwa, leaving Shah Alam in complete control of the city.

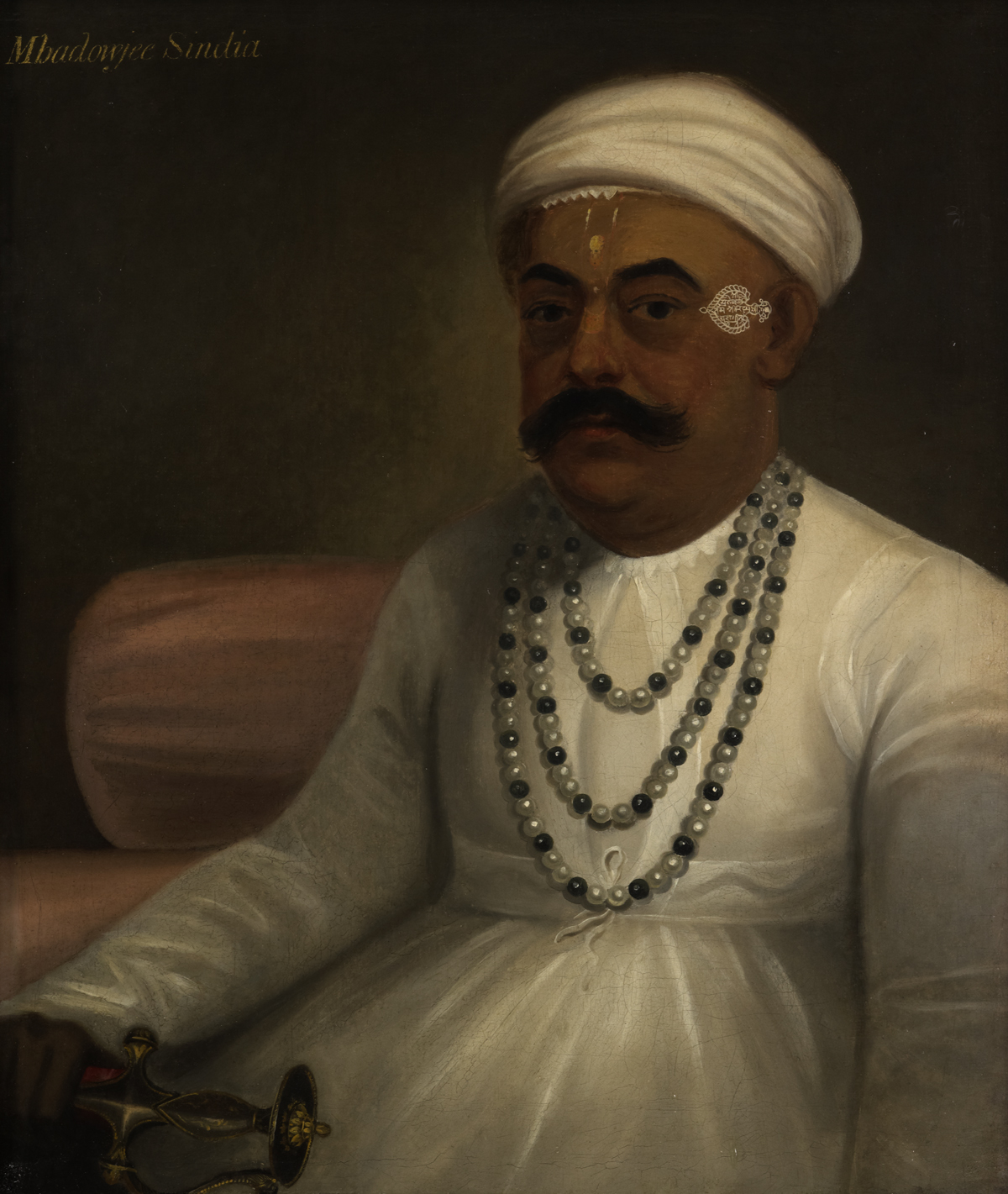
Mahadaji Scindia restored Shah Alam to Mughal throne in Delhi in 1771 and became the Naib Vakil-i-Mutlaq (Deputy Regent of the Empire).

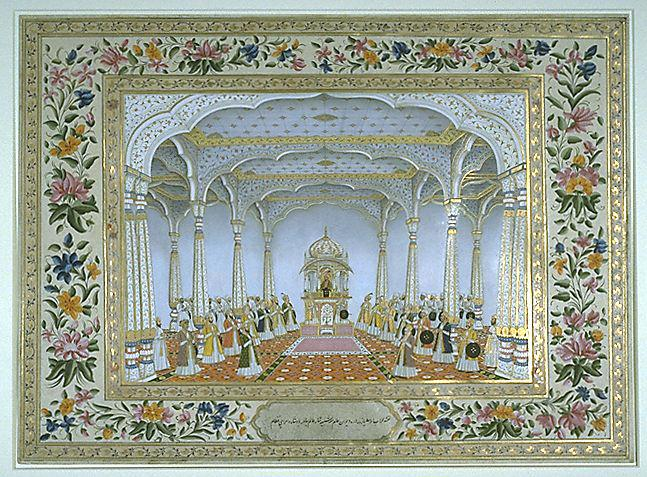
The Royal Chamber in the Public Audience Hall in the Middle of Yazdah Darreh, with the Ruler, Alam Bahador Badshah, and the Great Commanders, a page from the Lady Coote Album.

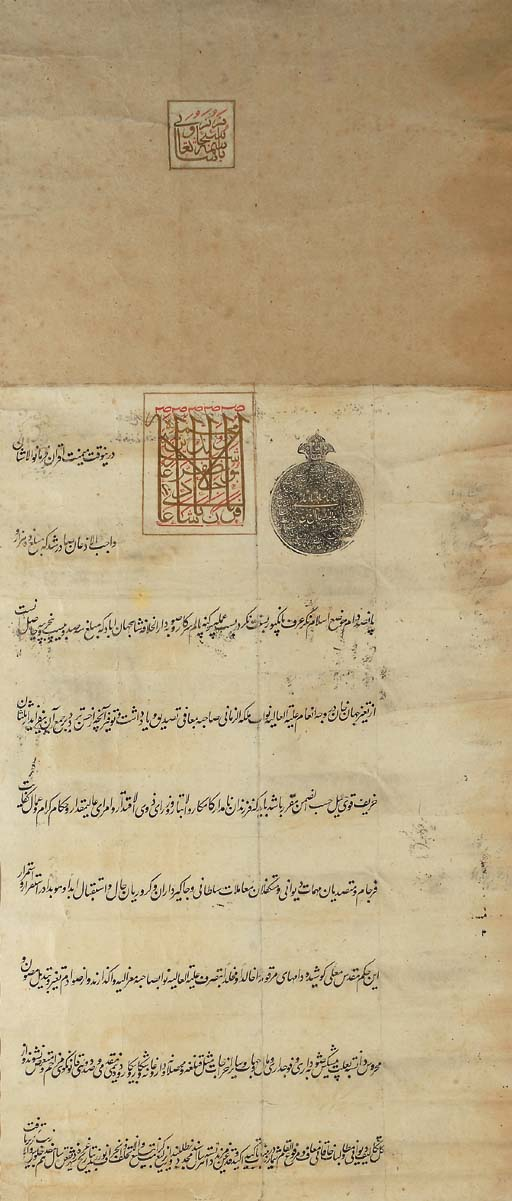
A Firman issued by the Mughal Emperor Shah Alam II, dated 1776.

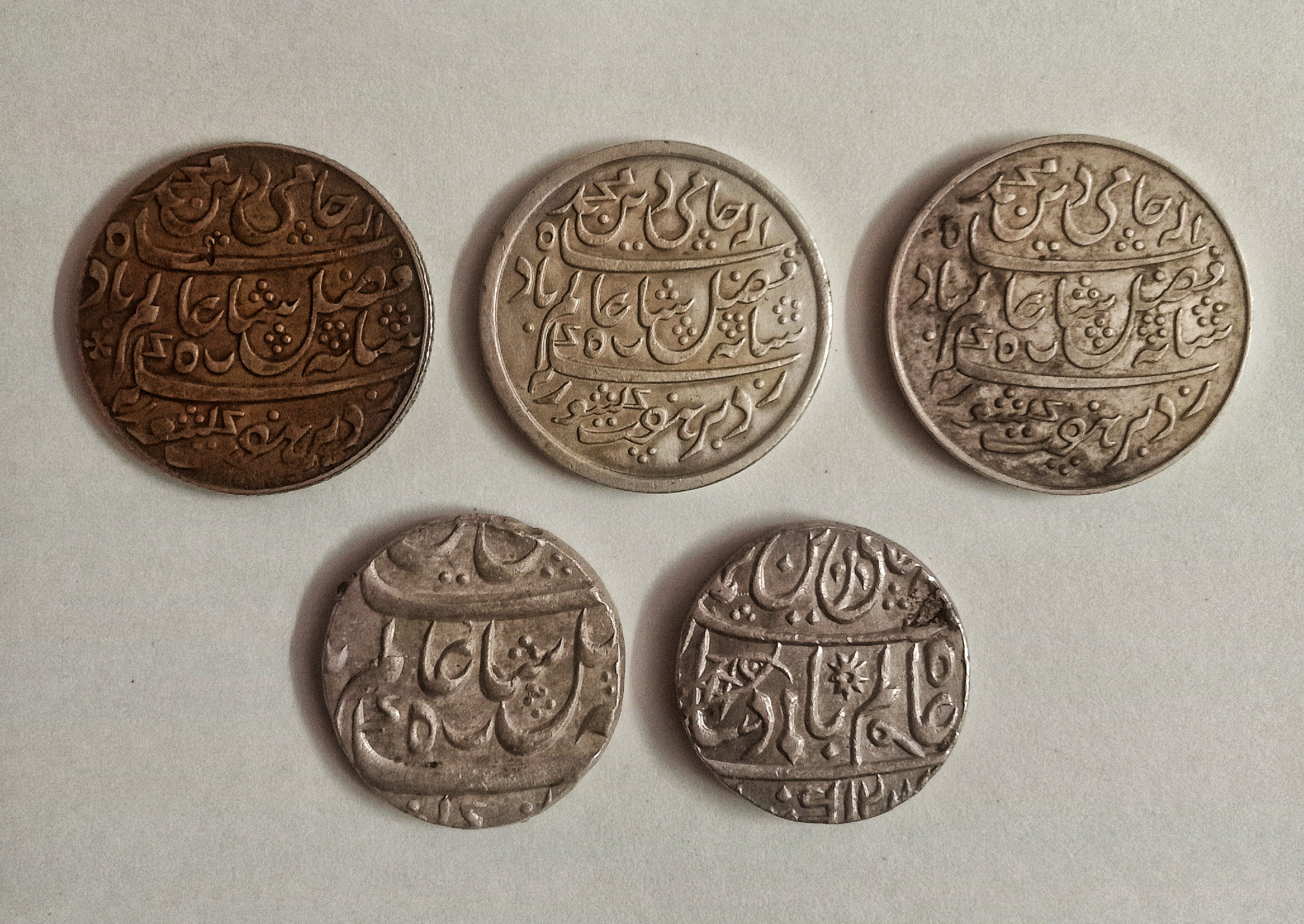
Silver Rupee coins of the Bengal Presidency, struck in the name of Mughal emperor Shah Alam II; From top left: Rupee of George Saunders' issue of 1819 (Calcutta), Broad rimmed Rupee of Farrukhabad, Narrow rimmed Rupee of Farrukhabad, Rupee of Murshidabad from the 1780s, Rupee of Muhammadabad Benaras with the inverted mace symbol and rare fish mint mark.

=== Reformation of the Mughal Army ===
One of his first acts was to strengthen and raise a new Mughal Army, under the command of Mirza Najaf Khan. This new army consisted of infantrymen who successfully utilised both Flintlocks and Talwars in combat formations, they used elephants for transportation and were less dependent on artillery and cavalry. Mirza Najaf Khan is also known to have introduced the more-effective Firelock muskets through his collaboration with Mir Qasim, the Nawab of Bengal.

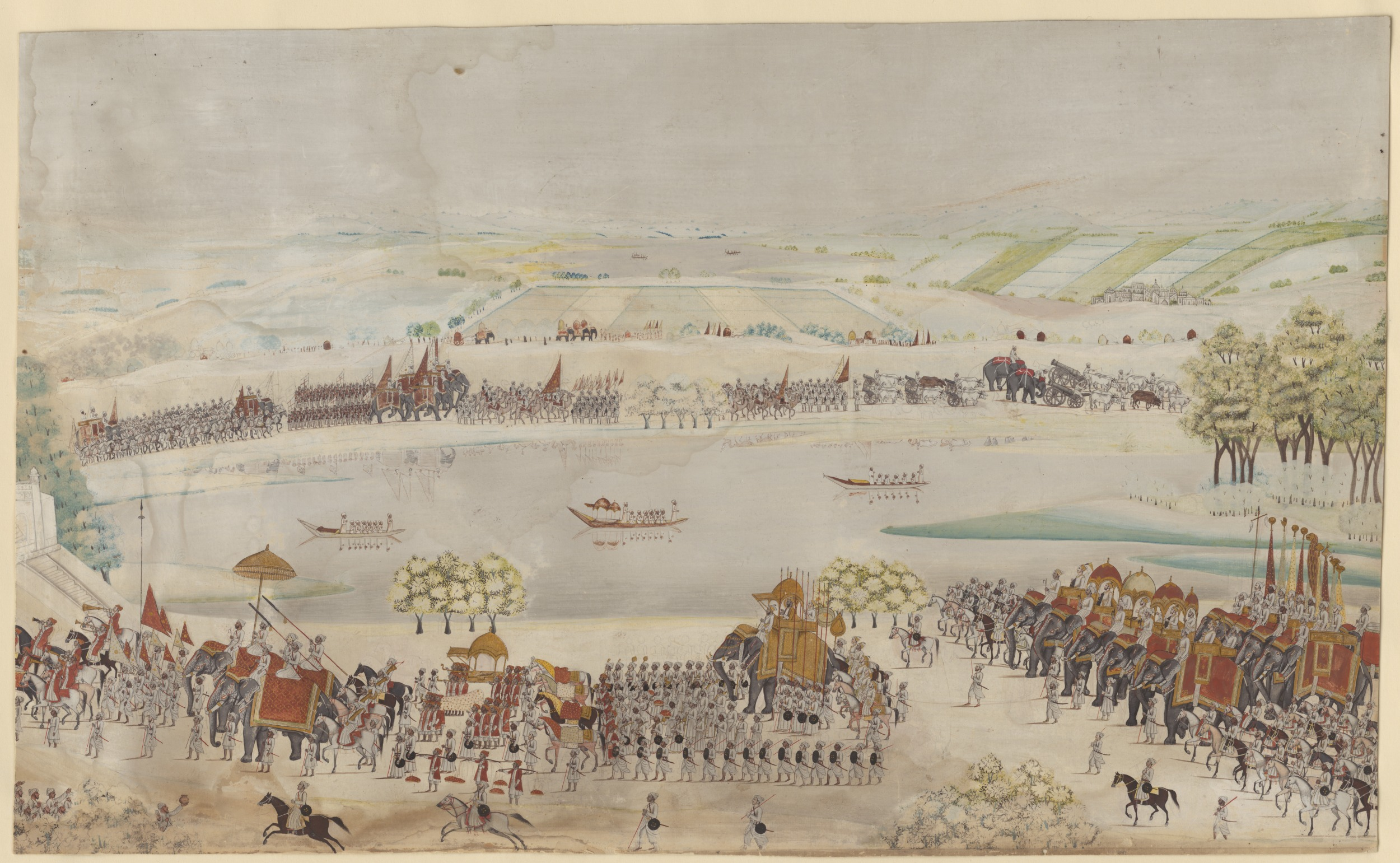
The newly reestablished Mughal Army during the reign of Shah Alam II.

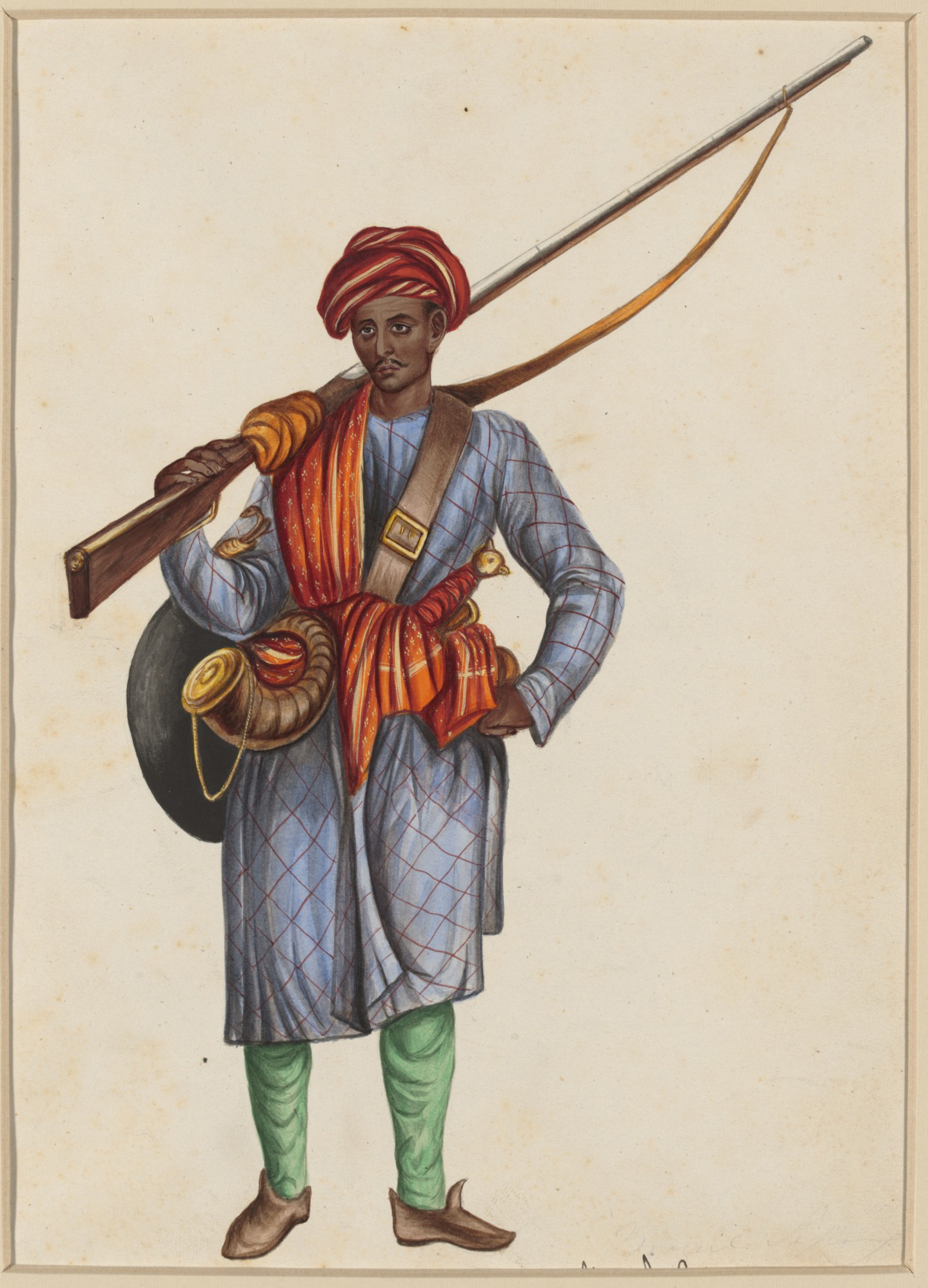
A Mughal Sepoy.

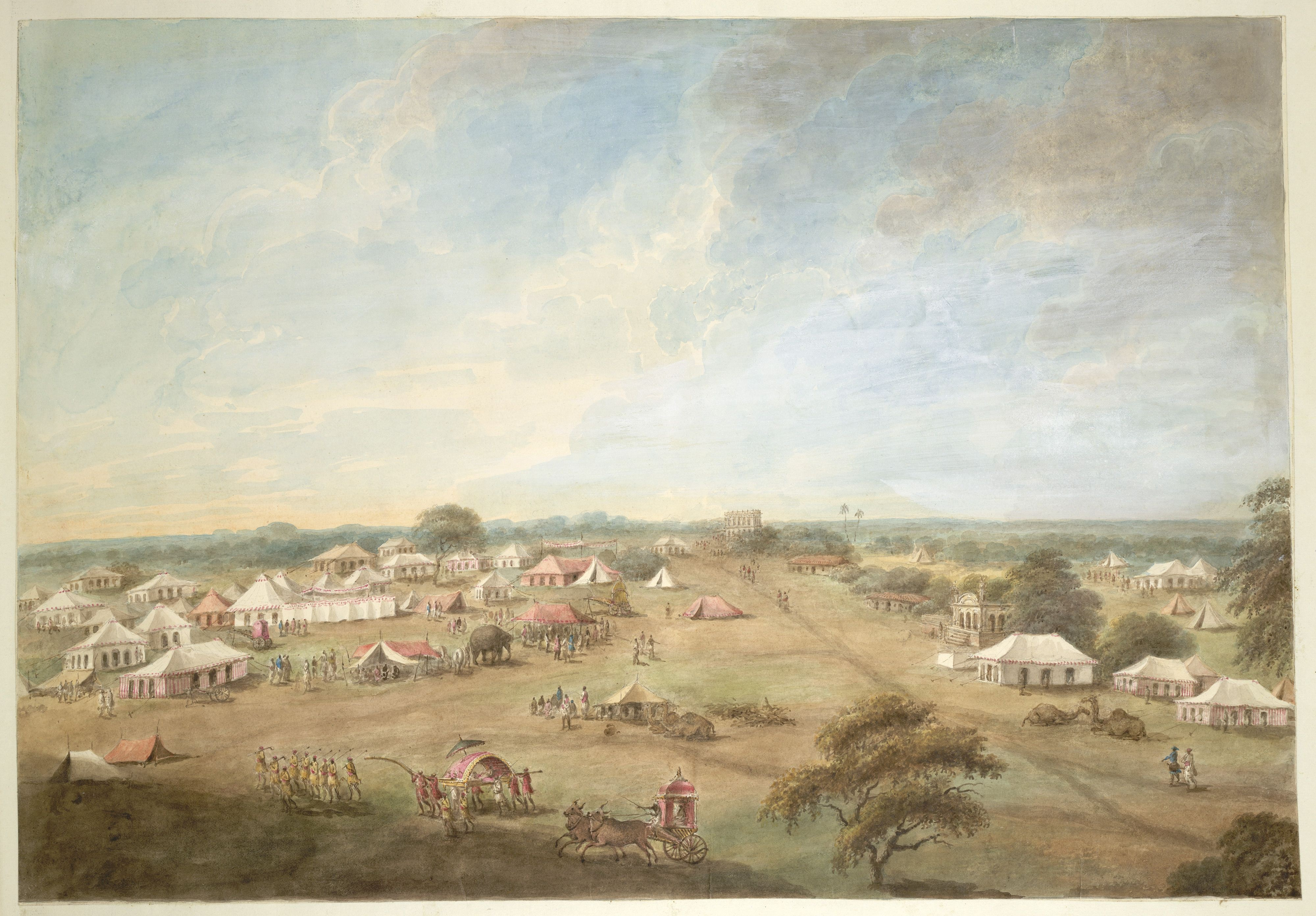
Large Mughal Army encampments during the reign of the Mughal Emperor Shah Alam II.

=== Foreign relations ===
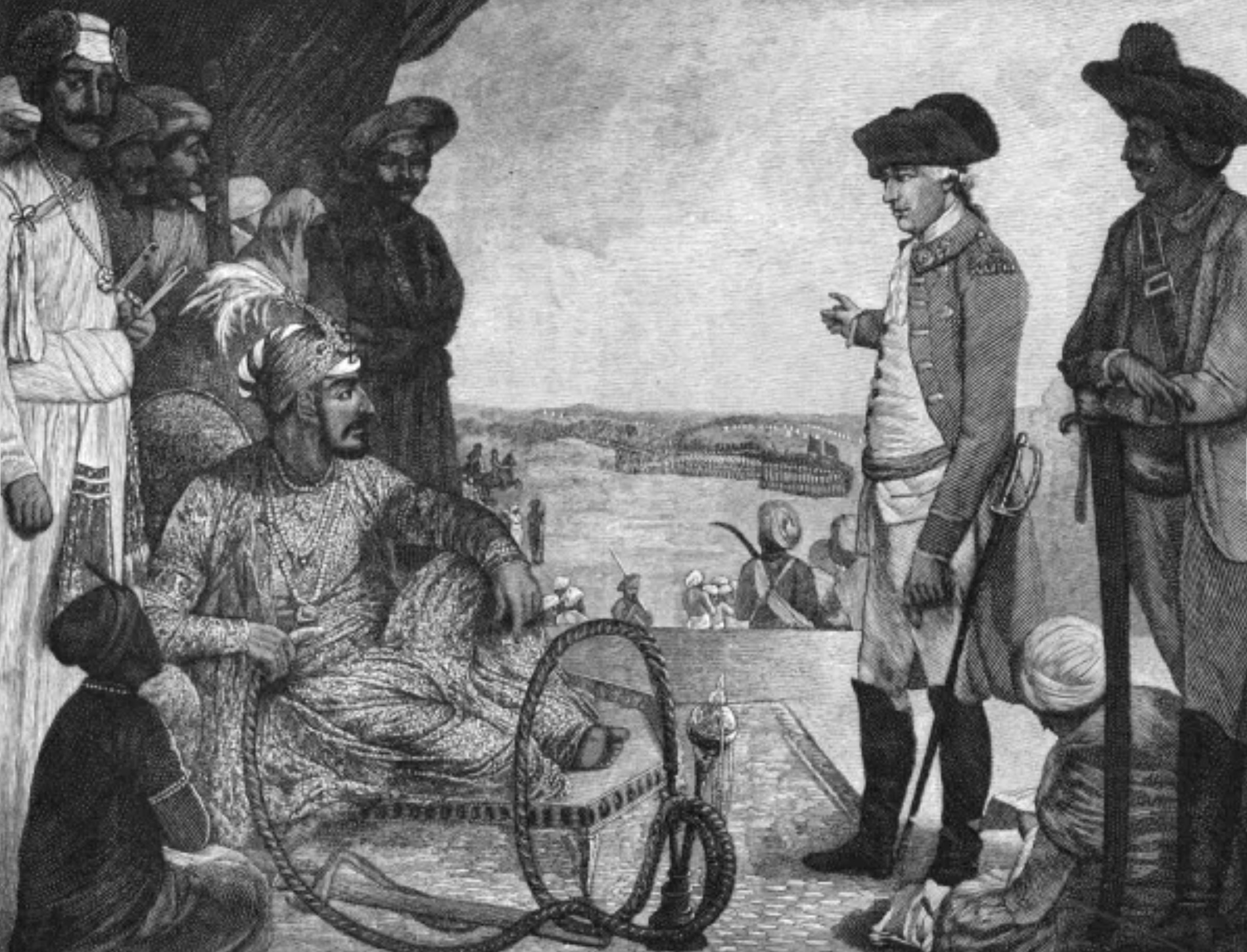
1894 illustration of Shah Alam II reviewing the British East India Company's troops in 1781

Shah Alam II, was well supported by Jean Law de Lauriston and 200 Frenchmen during his campaign to regain the Eastern Subahs (during the Seven Years' War). The brainchild of the campaign was Ghulam Husain Tabatabai, who had gained much administrative and military experience from both the French and the Dutch.

After Shah Alam II's defeat in the Battle of Buxar, the French once again reached out to emperor under Pierre André de Suffren in the year 1781, who initiated a plan to capture Bombay and Surat from the Maratha Confederacy and the British, with the co-operation of Mirza Najaf Khan, this action would eventually lead to Asaf Jah II to join Shah Alam II and the French and assist Hyder Ali to capture Madras from the East India Company. The internal conflicts within the Mughal imperial court would not allow the emperor to make such a bold move against the British.

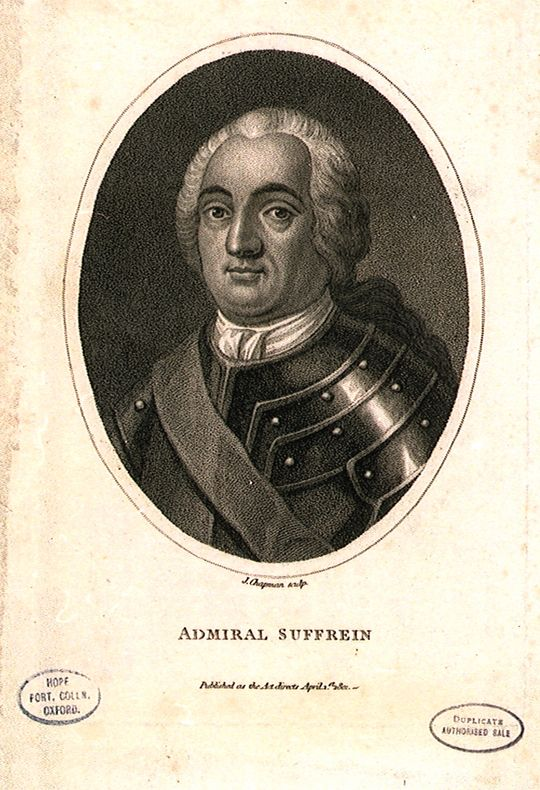
Pierre André de Suffren ally of Hyder Ali and also Shah Alam II.

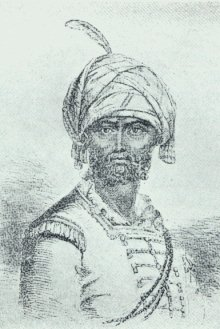
Hyder Ali was bestowed the title Shams ul-Mulk and Amir ud-Daula by Shah Alam II, his pro-French policies were a continuation of the Mughal Empire's policies during the Seven Years' War.

== Political turmoil ==
=== Jats ===
Jats rose in retaliation of religious intolerance pursued by Aurangzeb. The Jat kingdom of Bharatpur waged many wars against Mughal Delhi and in the 17th and 18th century carried out numerous campaigns in Mughal territories including Agra. Mughals were defeated by the Marathas in 1757; and Mughal possessions and territories were annexed by the Jats led by Suraj Mal.

During one massive assault, Jats laid siege to Agra in 1761, after 20 days on 12 June 1761 the Mughal forces at Agra surrendered to the Jats. Jats plundered the city and carried the bounty, including the two great silver doors to the entrance of the Taj Mahal. which were carried off and melted down by Suraj Mal in 1764.

Suraj Mal's son Jawahar Singh, further extended the Jat power in Northern India and captured the territory in Doab, Ballabgarh and Agra. Jats kept the Agra fort and other territories closer to Delhi under their control from 1761 till 1774 CE.

=== Sikhs ===
Sikhs had been in perpetual war against Mughal intolerance, specially after beheading of the Sikh Guru — Guru Teg Bahadur by the Mughals. Simmering Sikhs rose once again in the year 1764 and overran the Mughal Faujdar of Sirhind, Zain Khan Sirhindi, who fell in battle and ever since the Sikhs perpetually raided and took the bounties from the lands as far as Delhi practically every year.

The Marathas took Delhi in 1771 before Shah Alam II arrived. Mirza Najaf Khan had restored a sense of order to the Mughal finances and administration and particularly reformed the Mughal Army. In 1777 Mirza Najaf Khan decisively defeated Zabita Khan's forces and repelled the Sikhs after halting their raids.

In 1778, after a Sikh incursion into Delhi, Shah Alam ordered their defeat, the Mughal Grand Vizier, Majad-ud-Daula marched with 20,000 Mughal troops against the Sikh army into hostile territories, this action led to the defeat of the Mughal Army at Battle of Muzzaffargarh and later at Battle of Ghanaur, due to the mounted casualties Shah Alam II reappointed Mirza Najaf Khan, who soon died of natural circumstances leaving the Mughal Empire weaker than ever.

In the year 1779, Mirza Najaf Khan carefully advanced his forces who successfully routed the treasonous Zabita Khan and his Sikh allies who lost more than 5,000 men in a single battle and never returned to threaten the Mughal Empire during the commander Mirza Najaf Khan's lifetime. Najaf Khan as prime minister, granted sovereign rights to the Sikhs as agreement.

In the year 1783, Farzana Zeb un-Nissa had saved Delhi from a possible invasion by a force of 30,000 Sikh troops, under Jassa Singh Ahluwalia, Jassa Singh Ramgarhia, and Baghel Singh,

The Mughal Empire disintegrated to such an extent that Shah Alam II was only left with Delhi city to rule. In 1783, Jassa Singh Ahluwalia and Baghel Singh laid siege to the city. After entering Red fort, Jassa Singh Ahluwalia sat on the Mughal throne on behest of Baghel Singh and a title of Badshah Singh was given to him. Begum Samru requested Baghel Singh to show mercy on Shah Alam II. Baghel Singh accepted and stated his demands such as 30,000 of his troops to stay in Delhi and the Mughal Empire would pay for their maintenance. Other demands were the construction of at least 5 Gurdwaras and annual tax payment of 13.5%. The demands were agreed upon by Shah Alam II with a written agreement. Since Sikhs refused to accept authority of the Mughal court due to politics, Mahadji Scindia was given the regency with an agreement that Sikhs will not plunder the crown lands and they will be paid 1/3 of the Delhi revenue annually instead.

== Downfall ==
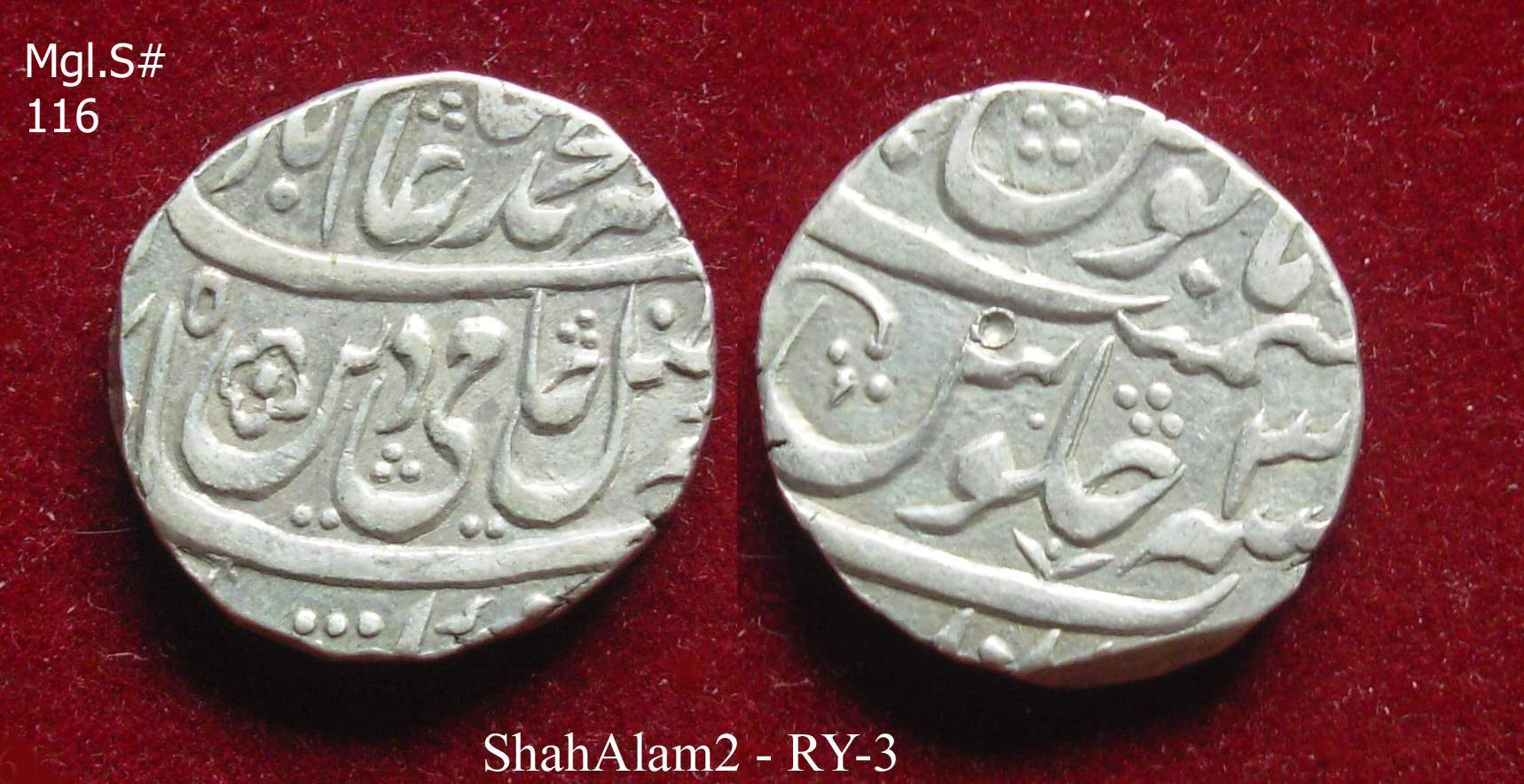
A silver Rupee struck in the name of Shah Alam

After the defeats at Muzaffargarh and later at Ghanaur, Majad-ud-Daula was arrested by the orders of Shah Alam II, who then recalled Mirza Najaf Khan. This led to the former Grand Vizier's arrest for causing miscalculations and collaborating with the enemies of the emperor. The traitor was imprisoned and a sum of two million dam in stolen revenue recovered from him. It was Shah Alam II's poor judgement and vacillation that led to his own downfall. Mirza Najaf Khan had given the Mughal Empire breathing space by having a powerful, well managed army in its own right. In 1779 the newly reformed Mughal Army decisively defeated Zabita Khan, the rebels lost 5,000 men including their leader and therefore did not return during the lifetime of Mirza Najaf Khan. Upon the general's death, Shah Alam's bad judgement prevailed. The dead man's nephew, Mirza Shafi whose valour had been proven during various occasions, was not appointed commander in chief. Shah Alam II instead appointed worthless individuals whose loyalty and record were questionable at best. They were soon quarrelling over petty matters. Even the corrupt and treasonous former Grand Vizier, Majad-ud-Daula was restored to his former office, he later colluded with the Sikhs and reduced the size of the Mughal Army from over 20,000 to only 5,000 thus bringing the Mughal Emperor Shah Alam II at the mercy of his enemies.

The respect toward the house of Timur is so strong that even though the whole subcontinent has been withdrawn from its authority, that no ordinary prince ever intends to take the title of sovereign...and Shah Alam II is still seated on the Mughal throne, and everything is still done in his name.

— Benoît de Boigne, (1790).

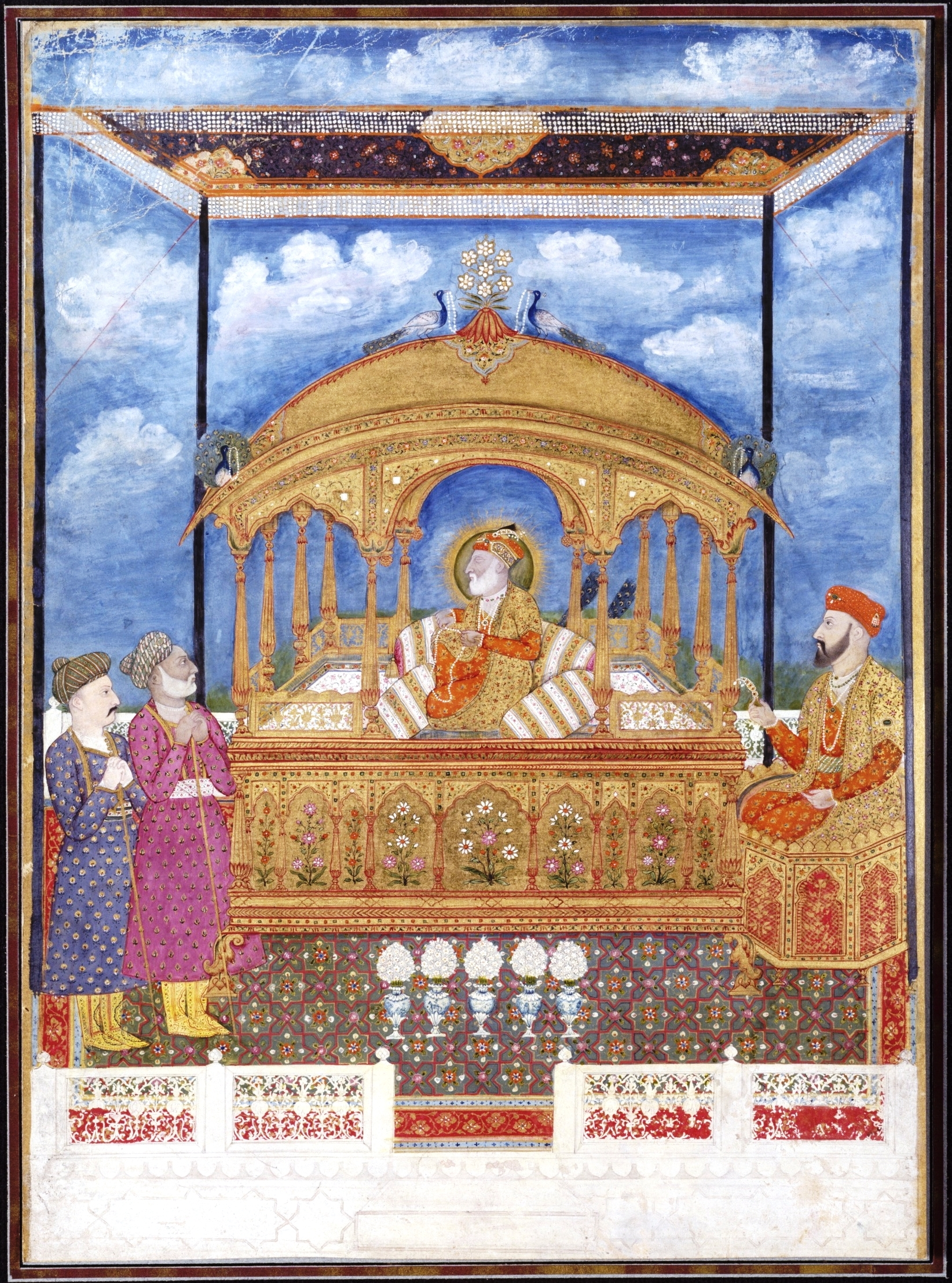
Shah Alam II blinded by Ghulam Qadir

=== Prisoner of Ghulam Qadir ===
Nawab Majad-ud-Daula was followed by a known enemy of the Mughals, the grandson of Najib Khan, Ghulam Qadir, with his Sikh allies forced Shah Alam II to appoint him as the Grand Vizier of the Mughal Empire. Ghulam Qadir ravaged the palaces in search of the Mughal treasure believed to be worth Rs. 250 million. Unable to locate such a sum and angered by the Mughal Emperor's attempts to eliminate him and his Sikh allies, Ghulam Qadir himself blinded Shah Alam II with an Afghani knife on 10 August 1788. Ghulam Qadir behaved with brutality to the emperor and his family. Three servants and two water-carriers who tried to help the bleeding emperor were beheaded and according to one account, Ghulam Qadir would pull the beard of the elderly Mughal Emperor. After ten weeks, during which Ghulam Qadir stripped the princesses of the royal family naked and forced them to dance naked before him (after which they jumped into Yamuna river to drown) and the honour of the royal family and prestige of the Mughal Empire reached its lowest ebb, Mahadaji Scindia intervened and killed Ghulam Qadir, taking possession of Delhi on 2 October 1788. He restored Shah Alam II to the throne and acted as his protector. Mahadaji Scindia sent the ears and eyes of Ghulam Qadir to Shah Alam.

=== Client of Mahadji Scindia of Gwalior State ===
Thankful for his intervention, he honoured Mahadji Scindia with the titles of Vakil-ul-Mutlaq (Regent of the Empire) and Amir-ul-Amara (Head of the Umara). He made a deal with the Peshwa granting tribute to Pune in return for the protection provided by Mahadji Scindia of the Scindia dynasty.

After killing Ghulam Qadir and restoring Shah Alam II to the throne, a Gwalior state garrison permanently occupied Delhi in 1788 and ruled in north India for the next two decades until they were usurped by the East India Company following the Second Anglo-Maratha War in 1803.

== Second reign ==
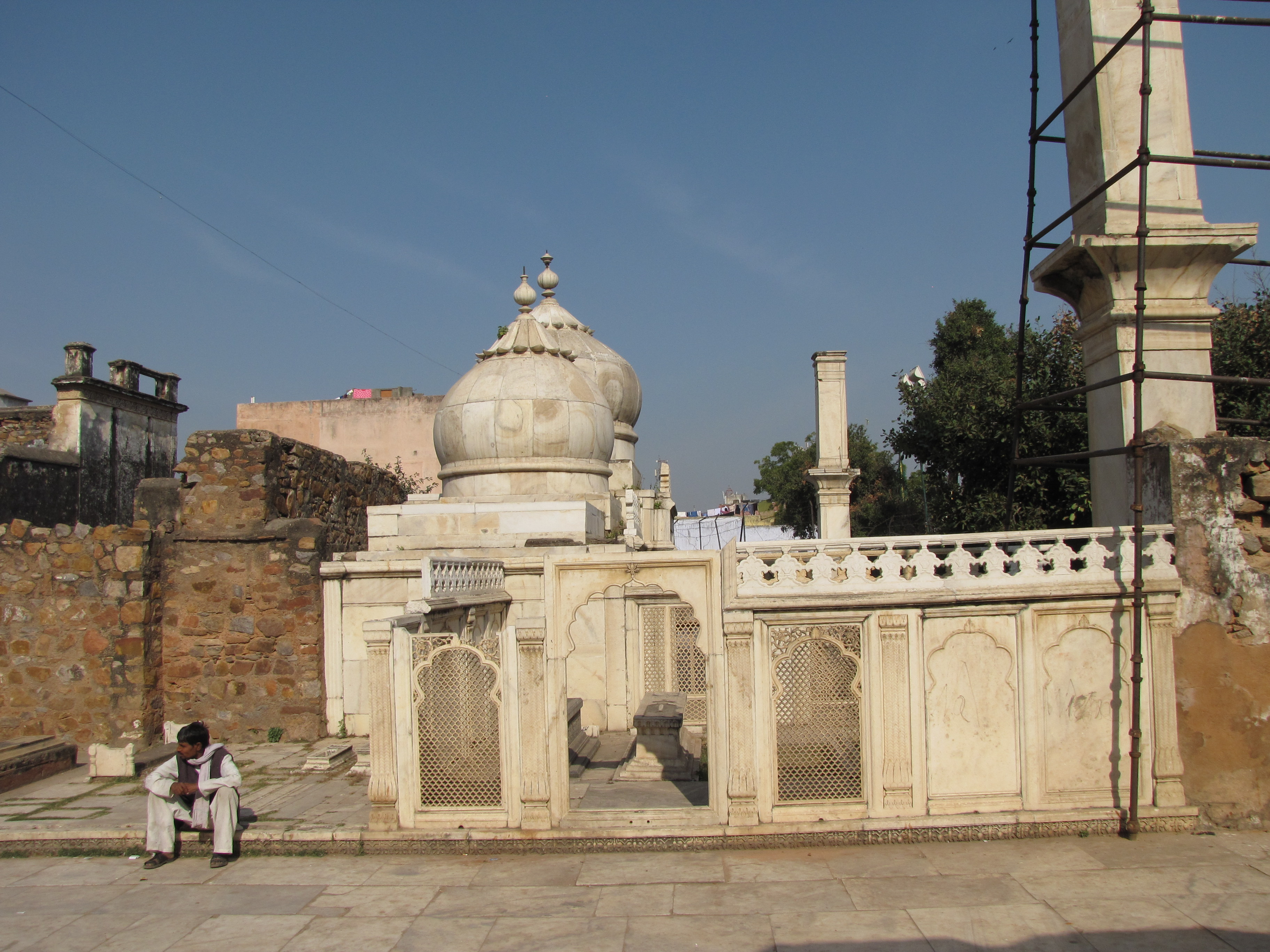
The tomb of Shah Alam II, in Mehrauli, Delhi.

The French threat in Europe and its possible repercussions in India caused the British to strive to regain the custody of Shah Alam II. The British feared that the French military officers might overthrow Maratha power and use the authority of the Mughal emperor to further French ambition in India.

Shah Alam II also corresponded with Hyder Ali and later with his son Tipu Sultan during their conflicts with the East India Company during the Anglo-Mysore Wars and was very well informed about the expansionist agenda of the British.

After the Battle of Delhi (1803), during the Second Anglo-Maratha War, on 14 September 1803 British troops entered Delhi ending the Maratha rule on the Mughals, bringing Shah Alam, then a blind old man, seated under a tattered canopy, under British protection. The Mughal Emperor no longer had the military power to enforce his will, but he commanded respect as a dignified member of the House of Timur in the length and breadth of the country. The Nawabs and Subedars still sought formal sanction of the Mughal Emperor on their accession and valued the titles he bestowed upon them. They struck coins and read the khutba (Friday sermons) in his name. The Marathas in 1804 under Yashwantrao Holkar tried to snatch Delhi from the British in Siege of Delhi (1804), but failed.

== Death ==
Shah Alam II died of natural causes on 19 November 1806. His grave lies in a marble enclosure adjoined to the Moti Masjid, next to the dargah of the 13th century Sufi saint Qutbuddin Bakhtiar Kaki, in Mehrauli, Delhi. Also in the enclosure are the tombs of Bahadur Shah I (also known as Shah Alam I), and Akbar Shah II.

== In popular culture ==
- In the 1994 Hindi TV series The Great Maratha, Shah Alam's character was portrayed by Rishabh Shukla.

== Gallery ==
Map of India in 1765, before the fall of Nawabs and Princely states nominally allied to the emperor (mainly in Green).

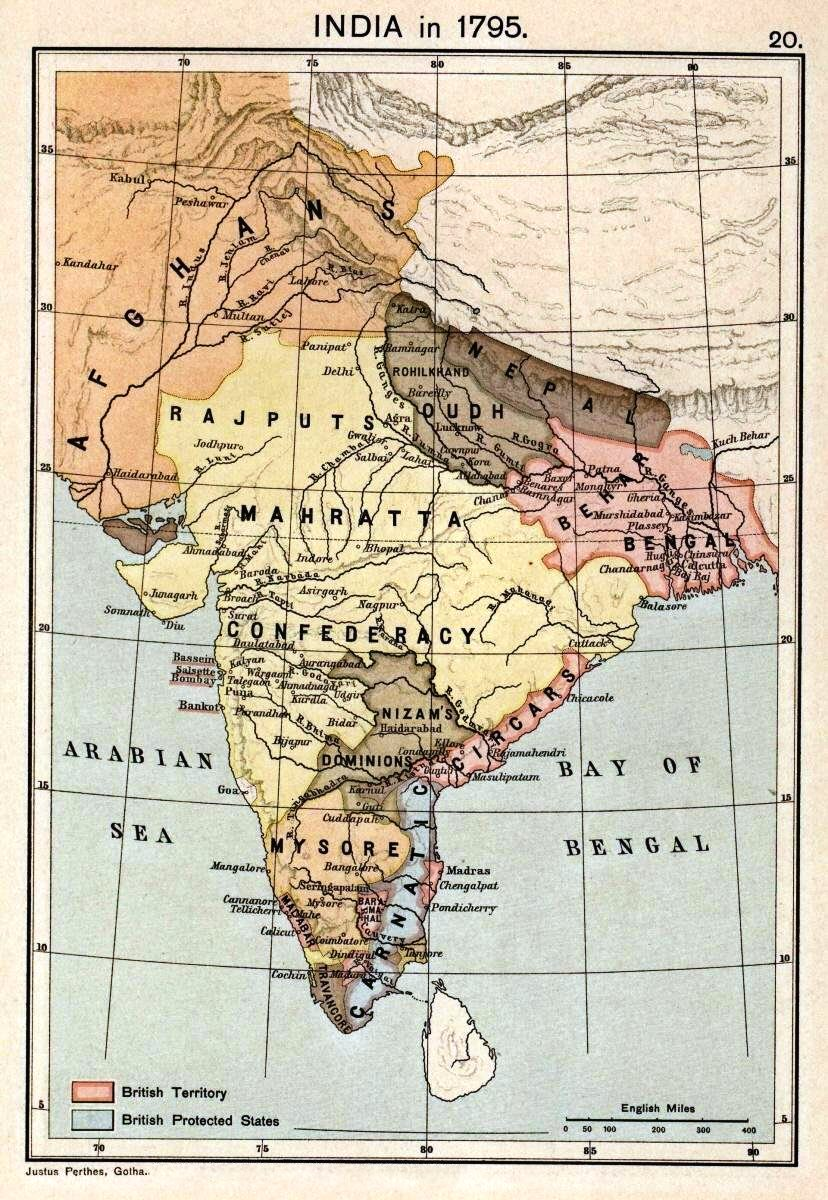
Map of India in 1795, 11 years before the death of Shah Alam II

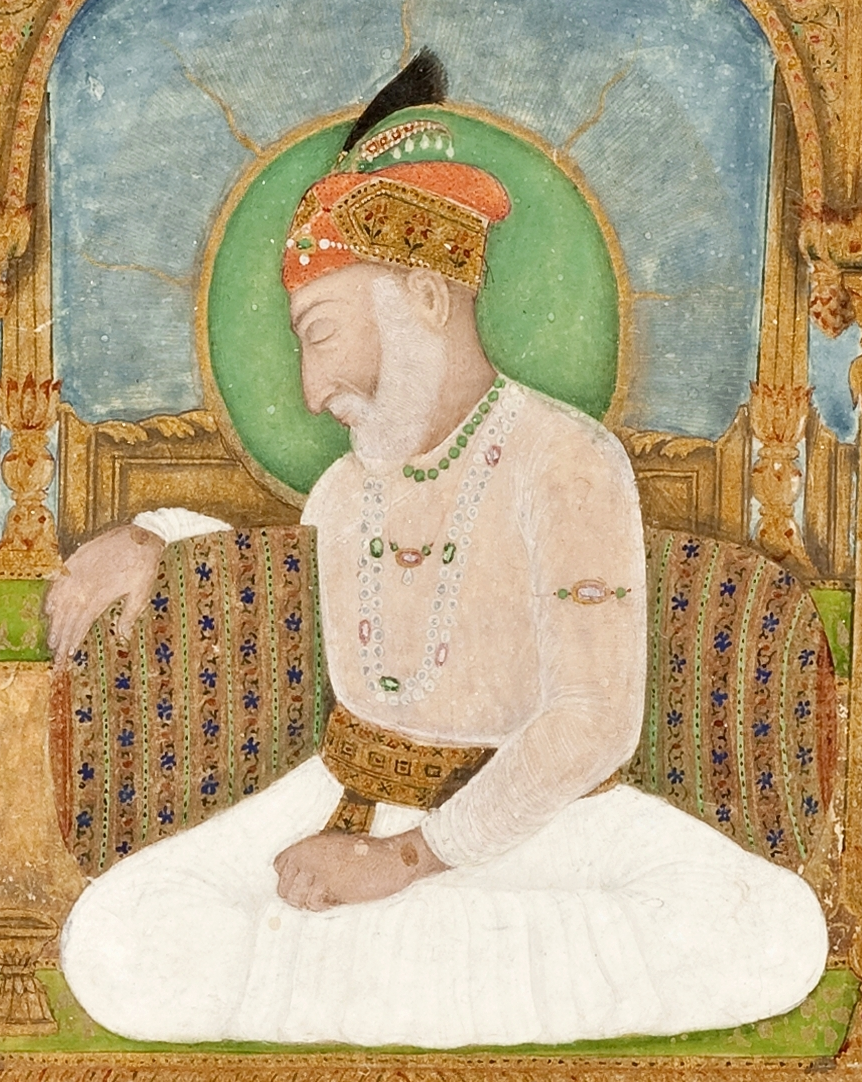
Blind Mughal Emperor Shah Alam II sits at throne of Delhi

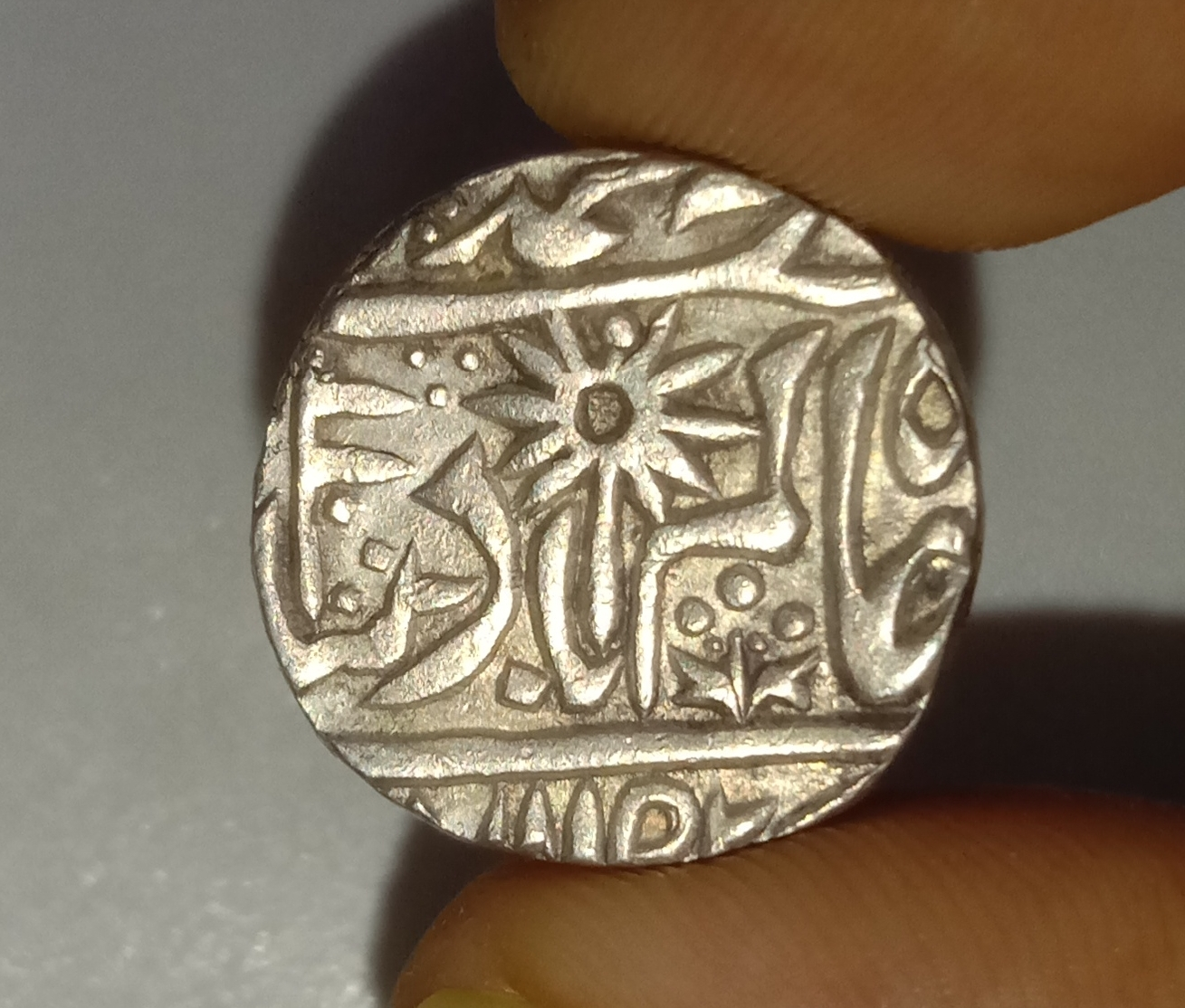
Silver Rupee of the Chhatarpur State, struck in the name of Mughal emperor Shah Alam II.

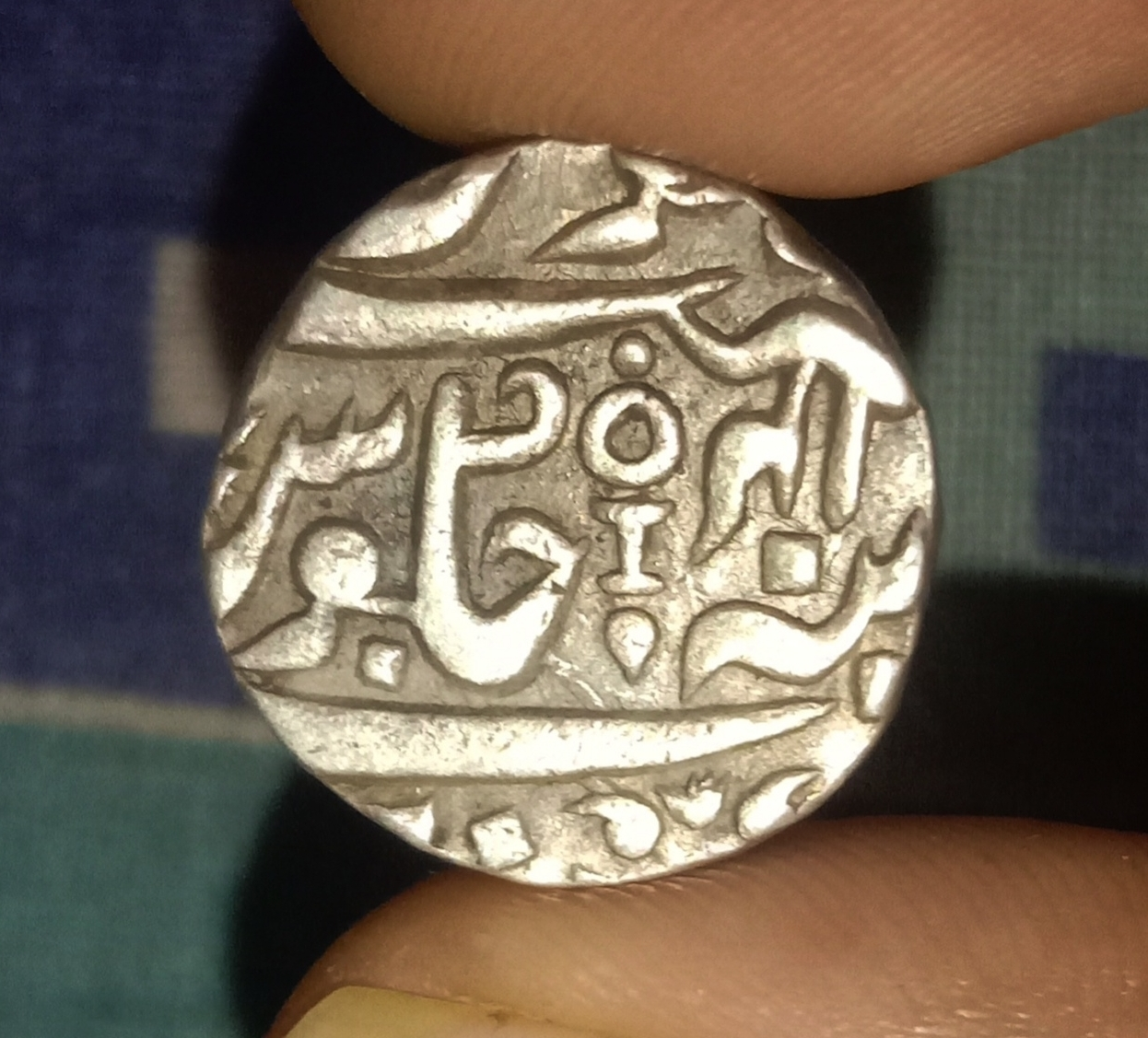
Silver Rupee of the Orchha State, minted during the reign of king Vikramajit Mahendra, struck in the name of Mughal emperor Shah Alam II.

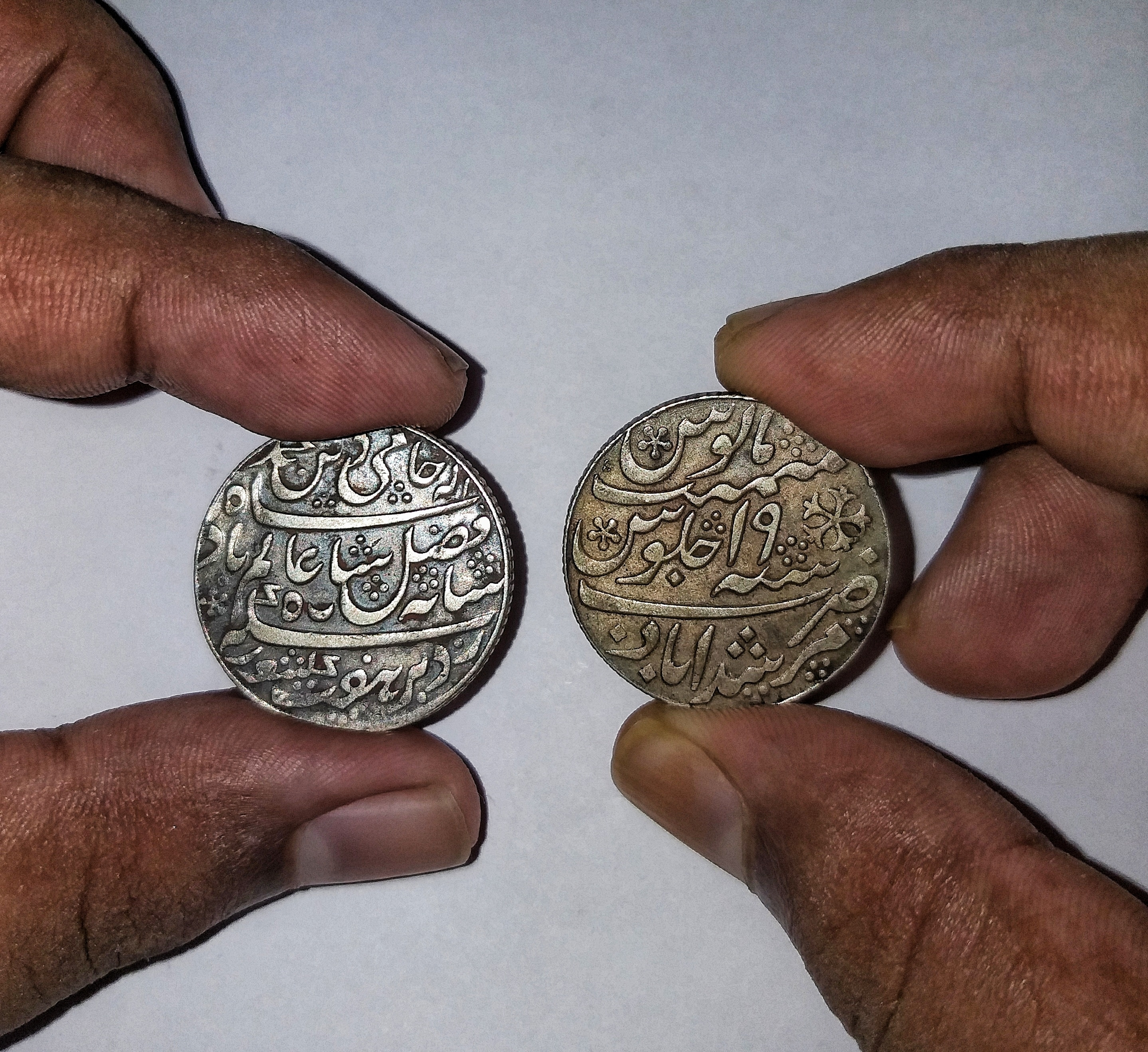
Silver rupee coins from the Bengal Presidency, struck in the name of Shah Alam II, Calcutta Mint.

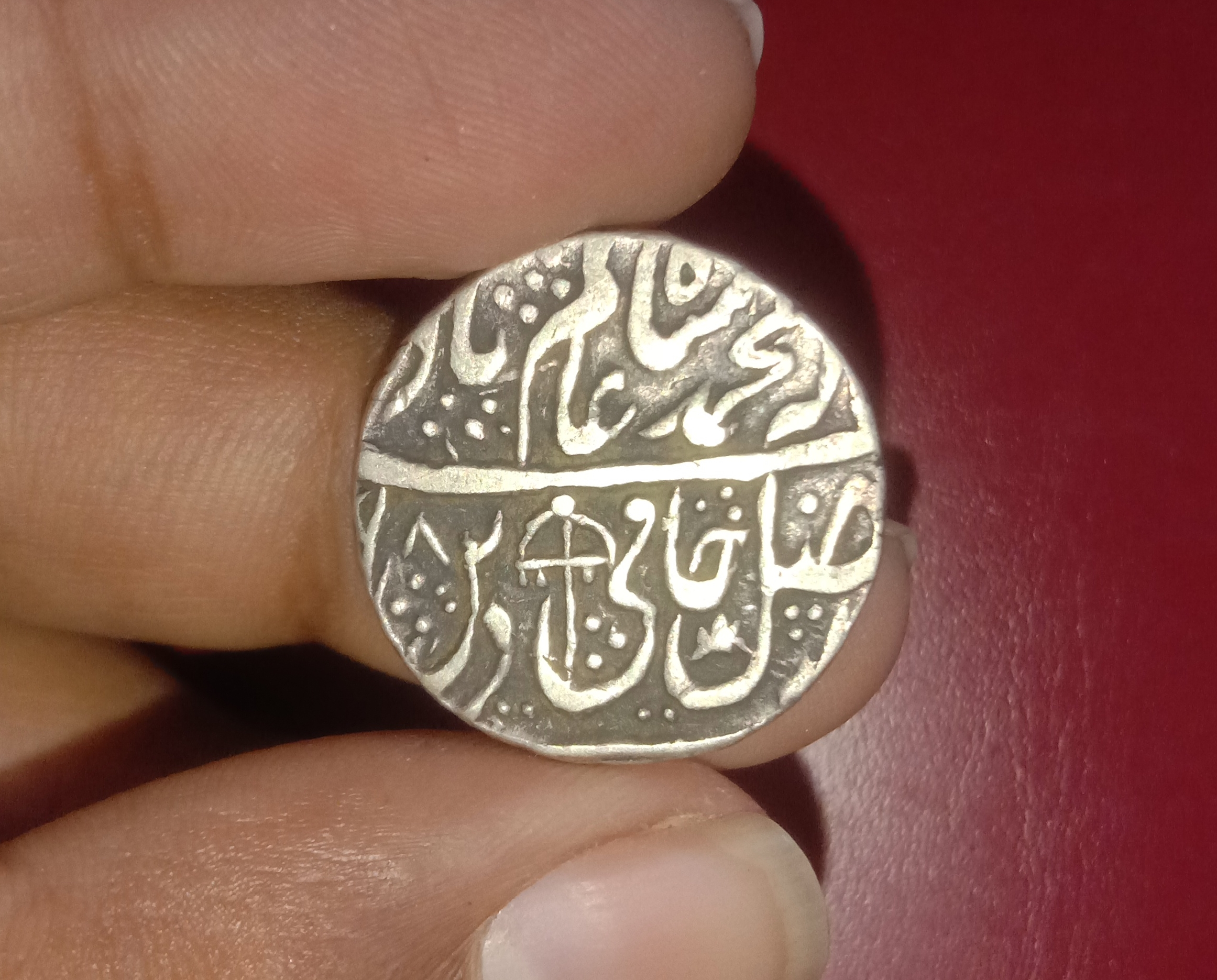
Silver Rupee from the Kingdom of Rohilkhand, minted in Qasba Panipat, struck in the name of Mughal emperor Shah Alam II, with having "saya-e-fazle elah" couplet, Swastika and Parasol marks.

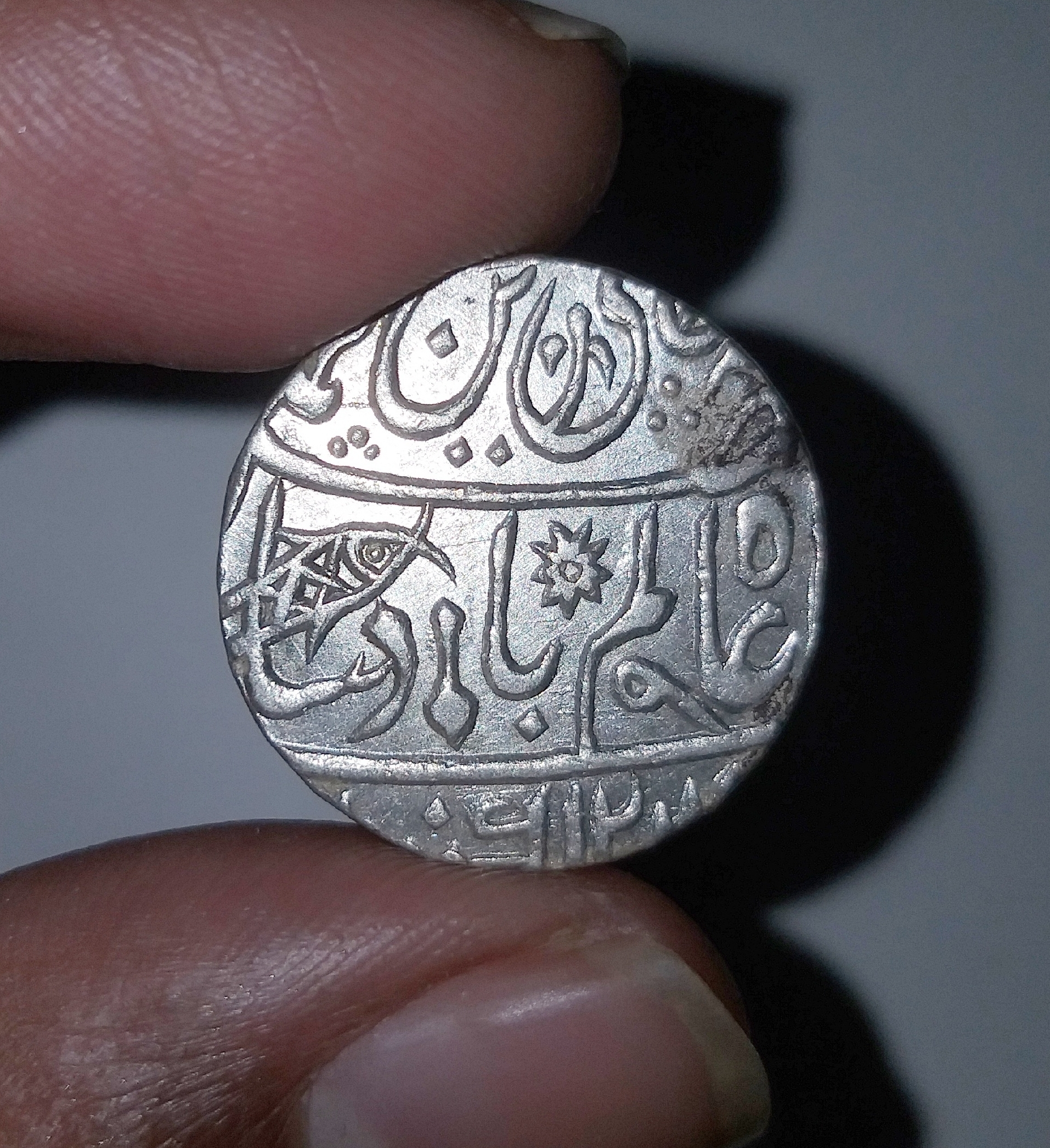
Silver Rupee of the Bengal Presidency, struck in Muhammadabad Benaras, in the name of Mughal emperor Shah Alam II.

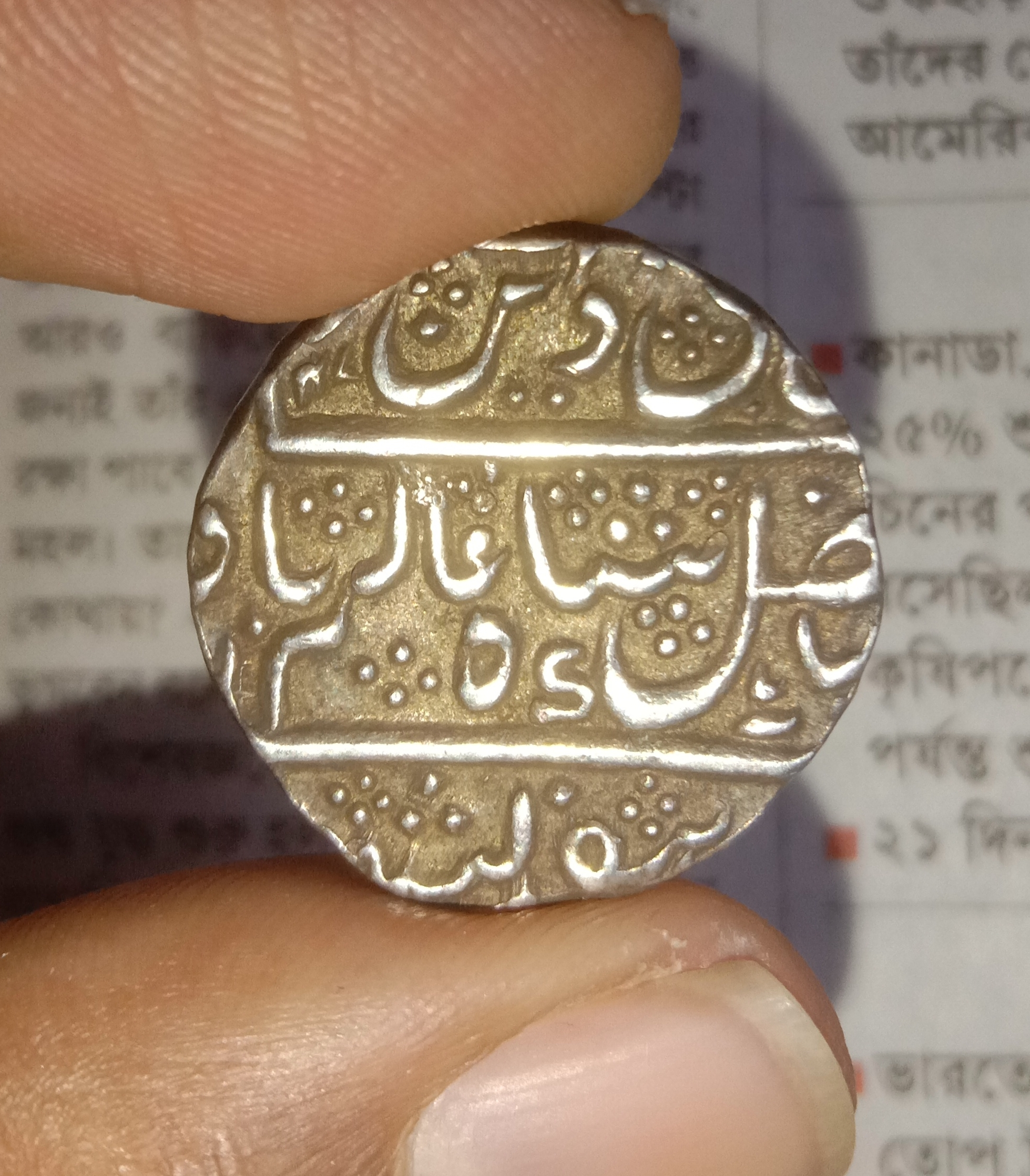
Silver Rupee of Krishna Raja Wodeyar, Kingdom of Mysore, struck in the name of Mughal emperor Shah Alam II, Zarb Mahisur Mint, AD 1805.

== See also ==
- Mirza Najaf Khan
- Shuja-ud-Daula
- Hyder Ali
- Muhammed Ali Khan Wallajah

Shah Alam II Timurid dynasty Born: 1728 Died: 1806
Regnal titles
Preceded by Shah Jahan III	Mughal Emperor; 1759–1806	Succeeded by Mahmud Shah Bahadur in 1788
Preceded by Mahmud Shah Bahadur in 1788	Mughal Emperor; 1759–1806	Succeeded by Akbar Shah II
