= Chattha =

Chattha may refer to:

== People ==
- Chattha (clan), a Jat clan of Punjab and a surname

== Places ==
=== Punjab, Pakistan ===
Gujranwala district

- Ahmad Nagar Chattha, a small town in Wazirabad Tehsil
- Ajitke Chattha, a village located in Wazirabad Tehsil
- Ali Pur Chatta, a union council of Ali Pur Chattha Tehsil
- Dehla Chattha, a village on Alipur Chatha Road, in Wazirabad Tehsil
- Jalalpur Chattha, a village in Wazirabad Tehsil
- Jamke Chattha, a town and union council in Wazirabad Tehsil
- Jugna Chattha, a small village located in Wazirabad Tehsil
- Madrassa Chattha, a village located in the Gujranwala district
- Mahay Chattha, a small village 13 kilometres (8.1 mi) from the city of Kamoke
- Verpal Chattha, a town and union council in Wazirabad Tehsil

Others

- Thatha Shamsa (Chattha), a small village in Hafizabad District

== See also ==
- Alipur Chatta railway station, in Alipur Chatha city, Gujranwala district, Punjab province, Pakistan
- Chatha (disambiguation)
