= Pandori =

Pandori or Pindori may refer to: A village or villages in Punjab and a Jat Sikh clan and surname in Punjab named after Pandori villages.

== Places ==
=== Punjab, India ===
- Pandori Dham: Historical Ramanandi Hindu temple in Gurdaspur district.
- Pandori, Bhulath, village in Kapurthala district
- Pandori, Jalandhar, village in Jalandhar district
- Pandori Khas, village in Jalandhar district
- Pandori (Ludhiana West), village in Ludhiana district
- Pandori Musharkati, village in Jalandhar district
- Pandori, Phagwara, village in Kapurthala district
- Pandori Sheikhan, village in Jalandhar district
- Pandori Jagir, village in Jalandhar district
- Pandori Jagir, Sultanpur Lodhi, village in Kapurthala district
- Dhak Pandori, village in Kapurthala district
- Pindori Rajputan, village in Jalandhar district
- Pandori Ganga Singh, village in Hoshairpur district

=== Punjab, Pakistan ===
- Pandori, Jhelum, a village in Punjab, Pakistan
- Pindori Kalan, a village in Wazirabad Tehsil, Gujranwala District
- Pindori Khurd, a village in Wazirabad Tehsil, Gujranwala District
- Chowk Pindori, a village in Kallar Syedan Tehsil, Rawalpindi District

== People ==
- Kulwant Singh Pandori (born 1973), Indian politician
- Ratan Pandoravi (1907–1990), Indian Urdu poet
