= Siege of Rasulnagar =

18th century siege in Punjab

- Part of Sukerchakia–Chattha conflict
| Date | 1778-1779 |
| Location | Rasool Nagar, Punjab |
| Result | Sikh victory |
| Territorial changes | Rasulnagar annexed by the Sukerchakia Misl |

Belligerents
| Sukerchakia Misl; Kanhaiya Misl | Chattha tribe |

Commanders and leaders
| Maha Singh; Jai Singh Kanhaiya | Pir Muhammad Chattha (surrendered) |

Strength
| 6,000 soldiers | Unknown |

The Conquest of Rasulnagar, also known as the Siege of Rasulnagar, was led by Maha Singh of the Sukerchakia Misl, with support from Jai Singh of the Kanhaiya Misl, against the Chatthas under Pir Muhammad Chattha. After four months of resistance, the siege concluded with Pir Muhammad Chattha surrendering to Maha Singh. This victory boosted Maha Singh's prestige, leading many Punjabi chiefs to switch allegiance to him.

== Background ==
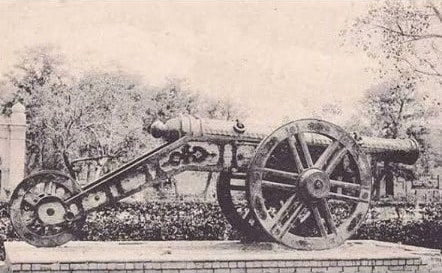
Photograph of the Zamzama gun or Bhangi Toap (which it was called by the Sikhs).

The town of Rasulnagar, located on the banks of the Chenab, was founded by Muhammad Khan Chattha. The Chatthas, a Punjabi Muslim tribe, led several disturbances against the Sukerchakia Misl, and on one occasion, they even seized the Zamzama gun from the Sikhs. According to other accounts, Jhanda Singh of the Bhangi Misl left the cannon to Pir Muhammad after defeating them. Nonetheless, Maha Singh used this as a Casus Belli to legitimize the invasion of Rasul Nagar, claiming that the Zamzama rightfully belonged to the Khalsa. With the assistance of Jai Singh Kanhaiya, Maha Singh led an army and laid siege to Rasul Nagar in early 1778.

== Siege ==
The siege lasted for four months, during which the entire countryside of Rasulnagar, owned by the Chatthas, was depopulated due to the effectiveness of the blockade. It was claimed that no grain could pass through it. Within the town, the populace began starving as a result of the food shortage. The Chattha chief, Pir Muhammad, tried to reach out to the Bhangi Misl for assistance, but they were occupied in Multan and Bahawalpur, leaving him without any options for help. Pir Muhammad retreated into the fort, which was soon besieged by the Sikhs, ultimately resulting in the surrender of the Chattha chief and his family. However, according to Hari Ram Gupta, Kanhayia Lal, and Muhammad Latif, Maha Singh resorted to scheming because he was not making any progress during the siege. He promised Pir Muhammad safe passage on the Guru Granth Sahib, the holy scripture of the Sikhs, but after the gates were opened, the Chattha chief was imprisoned, and his Sons were bound to the mouth of Cannons and blown apart. Historian Prem Singh Hoti, however, considers this claim to be baseless. Nonetheless, Rasulnagar was taken over by Maha Singh.

== Aftermath ==
Following the success at Rasulnagar, Maha Singh's reputation grew significantly, leading to many Punjabi chiefs who had previously been under Bhangi domination to come under him. Rasulnagar was renamed Ramnagar in honor of the fourth Sikh Guru, Guru Ram Das. Dal Singh, a lieutenant of Maha Singh, was appointed as its governor to oversee the affairs of the region.

=== Second Chattha repression ===
After the Fall of Rasulnagar, the Chattha tribe refused to surrender and rebelled. During this time, Maha Singh laid siege to Alipur and Mancher, successfully taking control of both. Alipur was later renamed Akalgarh.
