= Jhanda Singh's western Punjab campaign =

1772–1773 Bhangi Misl campaign

- Part of Expansion of the Bhangi Misl
Date	1772-1773
Location	West Punjab, including Rasulnagar, Sialkot, and Jammu
Result	Bhangi victory: expansion of Bhangi control and tribute network in western Punjab; seizure of the Zamzama gun at Rasulnagar
Territorial changes	Bhangi authority extended over or extracted tribute from parts of western Punjab: Mankera either occupied or made tributary

Belligerents
Bhangi Misl	Local chiefs of Talamba; Baluch chiefs of Jhang; Chief of Ahmadabad; Chief of Mankera; Local Chief of Kalabagh; Chatha Clan; Pathans of Sialkot; Ranjit Dev of Jammu

Commanders and leaders
Jhanda Singh	Various local chiefs

Jhanda Singh's western Punjab campaign was a military campaign conducted by Jhanda Singh of the Bhangi Misl in 1773, following the Bhangi capture of Multan in December 1772. During the campaign, his forces took Tulamba, reduced chiefs in Jhang, extracted tribute from Ahmadabad on the Jhelum, crossed the Indus at Kalabagh, raided parts of Dera Ismail Khan, captured Pindi Bhattian and Dhara, seized the Zamzama gun at Rasulnagar, and extended their influence into Sialkot and Jammu. Meanwhile Mankera was occupied outright or merely reduced to tributary status.

== Background ==
The campaign followed the Bhangi intervention in Multan in late 1772. During a struggle involving successive governors of the province, Shuja Khan, and the Bahawalpur State, Sharif Beg sought assistance from Jhanda Singh and Ganda Singh. By 25 December 1772, the fort and province of Multan had passed into Bhangi Sikh hands. Sharif Beg was allowed to withdraw safely to Talamba and later went to Khairpur, where he died.

After the occupation of Multan, Jhanda Singh appointed his step-brother Diwan Singh Chachowalia as governor, Jamait Singh as finance minister, and Lahna Singh as military commander. The territories of Dipalpur, Kahror, and Fatahpur between the Ravi and the Sutlej were leased to Madad Ali Khan of Bahawalpur in order to prevent cooperation between the nawab of Bahawalpur and Shuja Khan.

== Campaign ==
=== Talamba and Jhang ===
After the fall of Multan, Ganda Singh Bhangi returned through Bahawalpur and extracted a tribute of one lakh rupees, while Jhanda Singh moved westward. He first took Tulamba, a strongly fortified town near the southern bank of the Ravi.

Jhanda Singh Bhangi then campaigned in the Jhang area and subdued Baluch chiefs along the Chenab. The Baluch forces were joined by the chief of Ahmadabad and were defeated at Ahmed Nagar before Jhanda Singh advanced farther north.

=== Ahmadabad, Mankera, and Kalabagh ===
From Jhang, Jhanda Singh advanced toward Ahmadabad, west of the Jhelum opposite Bhera, where the local chief submitted and paid a tribute of twenty thousand rupees. Man Singh Bhangi took possession of territory between the Salt Range and the Chenab as far as Sahiwal and Shahpur.

Dalbir Singh and Bhagata Singha describe Mankera as having been captured or conquered. Historian Hari Ram Gupta, however, wrote that local tradition recorded in the Mianwali District Gazetteer did not support an outright Sikh occupation before the later conquest by Ranjit Singh, and suggested instead that the chief of Mankera was probably reduced to tributary status.

Jhanda Singh then crossed the Indus at Kalabagh, seized the place, and ravaged parts of Dera Ismail Khan district. On the return march, he captured Pindi Bhattian and Dhara.

=== Rasulnagar and the Zamzama gun ===
Jhanda Singh next attacked the Chatha stronghold at Rasulnagar, later known as Ramnagar, on the Sialkot–Multan road below Wazirabad on the Chenab. He seized the Zamzama gun and carried it to Amritsar, it became known as the Bhangianwali Top. The gun was placed in Qila Bhangian and notes an alternative tradition, drawn from Syed Muhammad Latif, about the gun's earlier movements before its seizure at Rasulnagar.

=== Sialkot and Jammu ===
In 1773 Jhanda Singh and Ganda Singh led another expedition against Sialkot and seized most of the district from the Pathans. They then advanced to Jammu, where Ranjit Dev accepted their suzerainty and paid arrears of tribute.

== Aftermath ==
By 1774 the Bhangi Misl had consolidated its position in many of the principal political centres of the Punjab following its campaigns of the early 1770s. He lists the Bhangi sphere as including Lahore, Multan, Jhang, Chiniot, Sialkot, Gujrat, Rawalpindi, Kasur, Dera Ismail Khan, Dera Ghazi Khan, Attock, Bahawalpur, Wazirabad, Hasan Abdal, Buria, Jagadhari, and parts of Jammu and Kashmir such as Bhimber, Mirpur, Kotli, and Poonch.

The Bhangis were the first of the Sikh misls to extend their rule over Amritsar, although the city later became accessible to the other misls as well. The Bhangi misl became the most powerful Sikh force in the Punjab during the seventh and eighth decades of the eighteenth century, with authority extending from the Indus to the Yamuna and from the Kashmir mountains to Multan.

== Sources ==
- Siṅgha, Bhagata (1993). A History of the Sikh Misals. Punjab (India): Publication Bureau, Punjabi University.
- Gupta, Hari Ram (1999). History Of The Sikhs: The Sikh Commonwealth Or Rise And Fall Of Sikh Misls, Vol. Iv (3, illustrated ed.). Munshiram Manoharlal Publishers. ISBN 9788121501651.
- Gupta, Hari Ram (1944). History of the Sikhs: Trans-Sutlej Sikhs, 1769-1799. Punjab: S.N. Sarkar.
- Singh, Dalbir (2010). Rise, Growth And Fall Of Bhangi Misal.
