= Maryam Abad, Gujranwala =

Village in Punjab, Pakistan

Maryam Abad
- Village
- Location within Pakistan
- Coordinates: 32°15′07″N 73°56′24″E
- Country: Pakistan
- Province: Punjab
- District: Gujranwala

Area
  - Total: 1.68 km^{2} (0.65 sq mi)

Population
  - Estimate (2017): `1,066
- Time zone: UTC+5 (PST)
- Calling code: 055

Maryam Abad is a village located in Wazirabad Tehsil, Gujranwala District, Punjab, Pakistan. It is named after Mary, mother of Jesus, as there is considerable minority of Christians in the village.

== Demography ==
Maryam Abad had a population of 1,066 in 2017. It is located about 38.9 kilometres (24.2 mi) northwest Gujranwala city via the Kalaske Cheema-Gujranwala road. The population of Maryam Abad is 80% Muslim and 20% Christian. Most people in this village speak Punjabi, though almost all can also speak Urdu, which is the national language of Pakistan. English is spoken by the elite in Maryam Abad. To receive commodities, the people of this village visit the nearby town of Ali Pur Chatta.

== Education ==
A government school is located in Maryam Abad. It is run by the Government of Punjab, Pakistan under the Board of Intermediate and Secondary Education, Gujranwala. For higher-level education, some students move to Kalaske Cheema and Ali Pur Chatta. For higher university level education, students move to Gujranwala, Gujrat, Pakistan and Lahore. Some private schools are located near this village, including:

- Government Girls Primary School (GGPS), Maryam Abad

== Communication ==
The only way to get to Maryam Abad is by road. This village is directly connected to the Gujranwala via Gujranwala-Ali Pur Chattha road. Rasool Nagar is the nearest railway station.

== See also ==
- Ajitke Chattha
- Shair Pur
