= Sukerchakia–Chattha conflict =

Date	late 1778 or 1779 – after 1789
Location	Punjab, Pakistan.
Result	Sukerchakia expansion into Chattha territory
Territorial changes	Rasulnagar occupied; Alipur occupied; Manchar and Sayyidnagar captured

Belligerents
Sukerchakia Misl	Chatthas

Commanders and leaders
Mahan Singh; Ranjit Singh; Jai Singh Kanhaiya; Dal Singh	Pir Muhammad (POW); Ahmad Khan (executed); Ghulam Muhammad Khan †; Hashmat Khan †; Jan Muhammad †; Bahram Khan †; Qadir Bakhsh †; Fatah Muhammad †

Strength
6,000 men (at Rasulnagar)	Unknown

The Sukerchakia–Chattha conflict were a series of late eighteenth-century battles in the Punjab between the Sukerchakia Misl under Mahan Singh and the Chattha chiefs of Rasulnagar and neighboring strongholds on the Chenab River. The fighting centered on the Chattha-held tract in the Hafizabad and Wazirabad parganahs, where the clan controlled seventy-eight villages and several fortified settlements. The conflict led to the occupation of Rasulnagar, its renaming as Ramnagar, and further Sukerchakia expansion into nearby Chattha territory.

== Background ==
The Chatthas were a Muslim Jat tribe established in the Hafizabad and Wazirabad parganahs, where they held seventy-eight villages. Their principal strongholds lay along the Chenab at Bangli, Ghudhi Gul Muhammad, Manchar, Nadala, Pandorian, and Rasulnagar. Members of the family also founded Ahmadnagar, Naiwala, Kot Pir Muhammad, Fatahpur, Alipur, Kot Ali Muhammad, Kot Salim, Sayyidnagar, and Kot Mian Khan.

Rasulnagar was founded by Nur Muhammad Chattha in the first quarter of the eighteenth century and was named after his Pir, Abdur Rasul. It is placed on the Chenab near the ruins of Bucha town and is also described as lying on the eastern bank of the river. The Chatthas are further described as rulers of a local state founded under Nur Muhammad, the grandfather of Ghulam Muhammad Chattha.

Conflict with the Sukerchakias predated the main campaign. Ahmad Khan Chattha removed the Zamzama gun from Gujranwala to Rasulnagar during Charat Singh's absence. Sultan Khan, the son of Muhammad Khan Chattha, is also described as having forcibly converted six Sikhs to Islam. Raids and counter-raids along the frontier deepened the conflict between the two sides.

== Capture of Rasulnagar ==
Toward the close of 1778 or in 1779, Mahan Singh marched against Rasulnagar with the assistance of Jai Singh Kanhaiya and a force of 6,000 men. The recovery of the Zamzama gun served as the immediate pretext for the expedition.

The siege and blockade lasted four months. Supplies were cut off, Pir Muhammad withdrew into the fort, and Rasulnagar was occupied by the Sukerchakias and renamed Ramnagar. Dal Singh was appointed governor or administrator of the place. The conquest strengthened the Sukerchakia position and brought additional chiefs formerly attached to the Bhangi Misl into Mahan Singh's orbit.

The Zamzama gun also figured in a violent dispute within the Chatha family. Pir Muhammad sought possession of it from Ahmad Khan, fighting followed, and Ahmad Khan's sons Bahram Khan and Qadir Bakhsh, together with Pir Muhammad's son Fatah Muhammad, were killed. Mahan Singh then besieged Pir Muhammad in the fort of Kot Pir Muhammad for four months. Pir Muhammad opened the gates after receiving a written assurance of safe passage on a leaf of the holy Guru Granth Sahib, but was arrested immediately afterward; the fort and town were sacked, and Sayyidnagar was taken as well.

Mahan Singh next demanded the Zamzama gun from Ahmad Khan and, after refusal, besieged Rasulnagar itself. Ahmad Khan escaped into the camp of Gujar Singh, was secretly surrendered by Sahib Singh, and was then put to death. Rasulnagar thereafter became Ramnagar, and its fall was linked with the news of the birth of Ranjit Singh on 13 November 1780.

== Later fighting ==
The Chatthas resumed resistance after the loss of Rasulnagar. Further campaigning brought Alipur and Manchar under Sukerchakia control, and Alipur was renamed Akalgarh. Alipur also appears among the settlements established by the Chatthas before its incorporation into Sukerchakia territory.

In 1789, Mahan Singh besieged Manchar, which was then held by Ghulam Muhammad Khan Chatha. The siege lasted more than six months. During Mahan Singh's absence, the nine-year-old Ranjit Singh is said to have directed operations there. Hashmat Khan, an uncle of Ghulam Muhammad Khan, climbed onto Ranjit Singh's elephant and was thrown down by the attendants. Ghulam Muhammad later agreed to surrender in return for safe conduct, but was shot after leaving the fort, and Manchar was occupied.

Jan Muhammad, the son of Ghulam Muhammad, escaped to Kabul and later returned to the Punjab in the train of Shah Zaman. During Shah Zaman's presence he recovered his territory, but after the Shah's return to Afghanistan, Ranjit Singh attacked Rasulnagar and Jan Muhammad was killed.

In Later conflicts it involved Hashmat Khan, a Chatha chief whose possessions lay on the Chenab. During one of Ranjit Singh's hunting expeditions, Hashmat Khan attacked him from ambush, failed, and was killed in the encounter. After his death, the Chatthas submitted and a large part of their estates were annexed by Ranjit Singh.

== Legacy ==
The conflict was commemorated in Chatthian di Var, a Punjabi ballad attributed to a poet named Pir Muhammad. The surviving text is incomplete and preserves ninety-one stanzas, with only part of a further stanza remaining. The events narrated in the poem extend over several years and fall between about 1785, when Ghulam Muhammad became chief after the death of his father Pir Muhammad, and 1792, the year of Mahan Singh's death. The poem presents the Chatthas as entrenched regional chiefs whose resistance centered on Manchar and neighboring strongholds.

== Bibliography ==
- Gupta, Hari Ram (1992). History of the Sikhs. Vol. IV: The Sikh Commonwealth or Rise and Fall of Sikh Misls. New Delhi: Munshiram Manoharlal Publishers Pvt. Ltd.
- Kaur, Balvinder (1982). Sukerchakia Misl up to 1799 (M.Phil. thesis thesis). Patiala, India: Punjabi University, Department of History.
- Siṅgha, Bhagata (1993). A History of the Sikh Misals. Punjab, India: Publication Bureau, Punjabi University.
- Singh, Harbans, ed. (1992). "Chatthian di Var". The Encyclopaedia of Sikhism. Vol. 1. Punjabi University. pp. 449–450. ISBN 9780836428834.
