= Shair Pur =

Village in Punjab, Pakistan

- Village
- Location within Pakistan
- Coordinates: 32°16′47″N 73°54′11″E
- Country: Pakistan
- Province: Punjab
- District: Gujranwala

Area
  - Total: 1.35 km^{2} (0.52 sq mi)

Population
  - Estimate (2017): 524
- Time zone: UTC+5 (PST)
- Calling code: 055

Shair Pur is a village in Wazirabad Tehsil, Gujranwala District, Punjab, Pakistan.

== Demography ==
Shair Pur had a population of 524 in 2017. It is located about 33.3 kilometres (20.7 mi) northwest of Gujranwala city via the Kalaske Cheema-Gujranwala road.

== Education ==
No government institute is functional, but some private schools operate in Shair Pur.

== Communication ==
Shair Pur is directly connected to Gujranwala via Gujranwala-Ali Pur Chattha road. Besides driving a car anyone can reach in 55 minutes to Shair Pur village, the only other method of transport near this village is a train. The Wazirabad-Faisalabad rail link is the only nearby railway line, and Rasool Nagar is the nearest railway station.

== See also ==
- Pindori Kalan
- Pindori Khurd
- Ajitke Chattha
