= Said Nagar =

Town and Union Council in Wazirabad district

Said Nagar سید نگر
- Town
- Location of Said Nagar Said Nagar (Pakistan)
- Coordinates: 32.2480002°N 73.7914931°E
- Country: Pakistan
- Province: Punjab
- District: wazirabad
- Tehsil: alipur chattha
- Number of Union Councils: 1

Area
  - Total: 1.09 sq mi (2.83 km^{2})

Population
  - Estimate (2017): 6,675
- Time zone: UTC+05:00 (Pakistan Standard Time)
- postal code type: 52081
- Calling code: 055

Said Nagar (Urdu: سید نگر), is a town and union council in Wazirabad Tehsil, Gujranwala District, Punjab, Pakistan.

It is situated approximately 2 km south-southwest of Ali Pur Chathha. About 97% of the town population is Muslim and 3% is Christian.

Said Nagar was the richest town of Gujranwala when Maha Singh was chief of the Sukerchakia Misl. The town's armaments industry flourished. Said Nagar was an important center for making swords and guns. Its inhabitants were very rich. Said Nagar had strong Muslim mansions and mosques. The Sikhs attacked Said Nagar and looted it. The people of Said Nagar left their hometown and settled in Gujranwala on the orders of Maha Singh. In Gujranwala they settled a separate mahalla which they named Said Nagri. During the looting of Said Nagar, the Sikhs seized a large number of arms and ammunition which further increased their strength.

Main families living there are Bhinders and Syeds. Popular persons living there are descendants of Ch Raheem Bakash Bhinder.

Ch Imran Tanveer Bhinder served as Chairman of Market Committee of Ali Pur Chattha

Ch Wajeeh Haider Bhinder served as Naib Nazim for Union Council Said Nagar twice

Ch Zulfiqar Haider Bhinder is serving as Vice Chairman of Union Council Said Nagar since 2015

Ch Irfan Yousaf Bhinder is serving as President of Jutt Federation of Pakistan

Union Council Said Nagar now includes nearly 10 villages which includes Madrassa Chatha, Fatehpur Chatha, Dhilwan etc.

Places to visit: Jamia Masjid Said Nagar, Masjid Haidria Said Nagar, Canal, Darbar Baba Harya Peer, Darbar Shah Khurram Peer

== See also ==
- Gujranwala
- Wazirabad
