= Thatha Shamsa =

Pakistani village

Thatha Shamsa Chattha ٹھٹھہ شمسہ چٹھہ
- Village
- Interactive map of Thatha Shamsa Chattha
- Coordinates: 32°15′47″N 73°41′35″E
- Country: Pakistan
- Province: Punjab

Area
  - Total: 7.3 km^{2} (2.8 sq mi)
- Elevation: 206 m (676 ft)

Population (2023)Estimated
  - Total: 1,000
  - Estimate (2023): 1,000
- Time zone: UTC+5 (PST)
- Calling code: 0547
- Number of Union Councils: 1

Thatha Shamsa Chattha (Urdu: ٹھٹھہ شمسہ چٹھہ), is a village in the Hafizabad District of Punjab, Pakistan. This village is located at 32° 15' 47 N,73° 41' 35 E with an altitude of 206 meters (679 feet).

'Thatha Shamsa' means 'the village of Shamsa' (Shamas Khan was his name). Thatha Shamsa lies in the vicinity of a major canal originates from Chenab River at Barrage Qadirabad Colony in the west of the village. The weather is usually intemperate in summer and winter but autumn and spring are mild. The weather is usually dry and humid during monsoons. Summer also creates a good level of humidity as surrounded by fish farms. Sometimes there are prolonged rain spells during the winter, which in the local language is called "Jarri", winter depression.

== Educational Institutes ==
Two primary schools were financed and governed by the Government of Punjab. Government Primary School for Boys and Government Primary School for Girls and later was under consideration to be upgraded to middle school. Most children, after completing their primary education, commute to Sooianwala High Schools to complete their secondary education. Ironically, the literacy rate in the village is very low compared to its neighborhood villages, i.e., Sooianwala, Madrassa Chattha, kot Hara, Nakki Chattha, Bhiri Chattha, Chak Ghazi, etc.

== Sports ==
Most of the time, people have to visit Qadirabad Colony, Sooianwala and Kot Hara to enjoy restaurant foods and various businesses. Thatha Shamsa's team has/had won a good number of regional cricket championships that were held in the region. But the lack of good playing grounds, kudos to local thugs and land grabbers, often force them to travel usually 2–5 km to practice and have an appropriate game.

== People ==
Despite reportedly having a lower literacy rate, this village has produced some respected academic personnel, who are even recognized internationally for their academic and professional work.

- Dr. Iqbal M Chatha (Ph.D. Engg., MSc Engg. Management, MSc Engg. Design, BSc (Honors) Engg., Ex. Govt Officer, Entrepreneur & Philanthropist),
- Dr. M Usman Chattha (MBBS, Bureaucrat),
- Dr. M Salman Chattha (MBBS, Physician)
- Ch. M Aslam Chattha (RTD SDO PWD Provincial GOVT)
- Engr. Adnan Farooq Chattha (MSc Engineering Management, England; BSc Mechanical Engineering, UET Lahore; MA Political Science, Punjab University Lahore; BA European History)
- Ch. Hamza Bilal Chattha ( Electrical Engineering, FAST)
- Ch. Bilal Farooq Chattha (MBA, Finance Specialist)
- Engr. Zeeshan Chattha (Civil Engineering, FAST)
- Dr. Ahmad Jamal Chattha (MBBS)

== Statistics ==
- 32°15′47″N, 73°41′35″E
- Calling Code: 0547
- Union Council: Vanike Tarar
- Major Crops: Rice, Wheat, Sugarcane
- Major Industries: Farming, Fish Farming, Animal Breeding, Milk Processing
- Banks: No Bank
- Religious Places: 1 Mosque

== Demographics ==
The population of the village, according to 2017 census was 940.

== Telephone networks ==
- Pakistan Telecommunication Company (PTCL)
- Pakistan Telenor HSPA
- Paktel GSM
- Pakistan Mobilink GSM Pakistan
- Pakistan Warid GSM Company
