= Pindori Kalan =

Place in Punjab, Pakistan

- Village
- Location within Pakistan
- Coordinates: 32°18′03″N 73°52′40″E
- Country: Pakistan
- Province: Punjab
- District: Gujranwala

Area
  - Total: 2.15 km^{2} (0.83 sq mi)

Population
  - Estimate (2017): 3,783
- Time zone: UTC+5 (PST)
- Calling code: 055

Pindori Kalan is a small village located in Wazirabad Tehsil, Gujranwala District, Punjab, Pakistan.

== Demography ==
Pindori Kalan has a population of over 3,700. It is located about 26 kilometres northwest of Gujranwala city. For cargo delivery Pakistan Post is active in village. The village has all basic facilities, except for a government hospital and natural gas connections for households.

== Education ==
Government schools are functional by Government of Punjab, Pakistan under Board of Intermediate and Secondary Education, Gujranwala. These include Government Boys Primary School (GPS), Pindori Kalan. For higher-level education some students move to Kalaske Cheema and Ahmad Nagar Chattha, and for university education to Gujranwala and Gujrat. Some private schools also function in the area.

== Communication ==
The only way to get Pindori Kalan is by road. Pindori Kalan is directly connected with Kalaske Cheema. Besides driving your own car (which takes about 45 minutes from Gujranwala, 25 minutes from Ali Pur Chatta). The Wazirabad-Faisalabad rail link is the only nearest railway line and Rasool Nagar is the nearest railway station.

== See also ==
- Bega Khurd
- Bega Kalan
- Dharam Kot
