= Pindori Khurd =

Pakistani village

Pindori Khurd New Pindori
- Village
- Location within Pakistan
- Coordinates: 32°18′46″N 73°53′08″E
- Country: Pakistan
- Province: Punjab
- District: Gujranwala

Area
  - Total: 1.5 km^{2} (0.58 sq mi)

Population
  - Estimate (2017): 1,891
- Time zone: UTC+5 (PST)
- Calling code: 055

Pindori Khurd also known as New Pindori is a village in Wazirabad Tehsil, Gujranwala District, Punjab, Pakistan.

== Demography ==
Pindori Khurd, with a population of over 1,800, is located about 41 kilometres northwest of Gujranwala. The population is predominantly Muslim (over 97%) with a small Christian minority (3%). Most residents speak Punjabi, though nearly all are also fluent in Urdu, Pakistan's national language. English is spoken by the educated elite. The village is equipped with the basic facilities, including a government-funded hospital and natural gas supply.

== Education ==
Government schools are operated by the Government of Punjab, Pakistan under Board of Intermediate and Secondary Education, Gujranwala. These include Government Boys Primary School (GPS), Pindori Khurd. For further education some students move to Kalaske Cheema, and for university level to Gujranwala and Lahore. Some private schools also function in the area.

== Communication ==
The only way to get Pindori Khurd is by road. Pindori Khurd is directly connected with Kalaske Cheema. Besides driving your own car (which takes about 1 hour and 10 minutes from Gujranwala, 35 minutes from Ali Pur Chatta). The Wazirabad-Faisalabad rail link is the only nearest railway line and Rasool Nagar is the nearest railway station.

== See also ==
- Bega Kalan
- Dharam Kot
- Pindori Kalan
