= Kot Paroya =

Kot Proya
- Village
- Location within Pakistan
- Coordinates: 32°14′05″N 74°00′19″E
- Country: Pakistan
- Province: Punjab
- District: Gujranwala
- Time zone: UTC+5 (PST)

Kot Proya is a small village in Gujranwala District, Punjab, Pakistan located about a mile from the Alipur Road connecting Ali Pur Chatta and Gujranwala, encompassing an area of 500 acres. It was founded during the time of Emperor Aurengzeb.

It is located in the district of Gujranwala about 18 km west of Gujranwala City, Punjab, Pakistan and about 90 km NW of the provincial capital Lahore. It is surrounded by many villages which provide a major portion of the local labour force.

The closest major town is Kalaske Cheema.

- Country: Pakistan
- Province: Punjab
- District: Gujranwala
- Dial Code: 055
- Post Code: 52071
- Population: ~1,000
- Christian Minority: 30
