= Chatha (disambiguation) =

Chatha may refers to:

== Given names ==
Chatha (clan) dynamically hold favourable position in broader Chauhan-household accompanied by Cheema subset, habitually described as one of the living descendants in the direct bloodline of Prithviraj grandson.

== Places ==
Chatha is a village in Batala in Gurdaspur district of Punjab State, India.

== Persons ==
Chatha may also refer to:

- Akmal Saif Chatha (born 1973), Pakistani politician
- A clan of Jats

== See also ==
- Chattha (disambiguation)
