= Jamke Chattha =

Town and Union Council in Wazirabad Tehsil

Jamke Chattha جامکے چٹھہ
- Town
- Location of Jamke Chattha Jamke Chattha (Pakistan)
- Coordinates: 32°20′0″N 73°54′0″E
- Country: Pakistan
- Province: Punjab
- District: Wazirabad
- Tehsil: Ali pur chattha
- Number of Union Councils: 1

Area
  - Total: 2.07 sq mi (5.37 km^{2})

Population
  - Estimate (2017): 9,355
- Time zone: UTC+05:00 (Pakistan Standard Time)
- Postal code type: 52060
- Calling code: 055

Jamke Chattha (Urdu: جامکے چٹھہ) is a town and union council in Ali pur chattha, Wazirabad District, of the Punjab province in Pakistan.

== See also ==
- Gujranwala
- Ahmad Nagar Chattha
