= Jati Shah Rehman =

Coordinates: 32°19′5″N 73°54′14″E

Jati Shah Rehman is a small village in Gujranwala District, Punjab, Pakistan. It had a population of 1,304 in the 2017 Pakistan census.

== See also ==
- Gujranwala Electric Power Company
- Aminabad, Gujranwala
- Ali Pur Chatta
- Sooianwala
