= Maryamabad =

Maryamabad (Persian: مريم اباد, Urdu: ماریہ آباد) may refer to:

- Maryamabad, Golestan
- Maryamabad, Gujranwala
- Maryamabad, Hormozgan
- Maryamabad, Sheikhupura
- Maryamabad, Yazd
