= Ajitke Chattha =

Place in Punjab, Pakistan

- Village
- Location within Pakistan
- Coordinates: 32°17′21″N 73°53′56″E
- Country: Pakistan
- Province: Punjab
- District: Gujranwala

Area
  - Total: 2.5 km^{2} (0.97 sq mi)

Population
  - Estimate (2017): 1,194
- Time zone: UTC+5 (PST)
- Calling code: 055

Ajitke Chattha (also spelled Ajit Kay Chattha and Ajitkay Chattha) is a village in Wazirabad Tehsil, Gujranwala District, Punjab, Pakistan.

== Demography ==
Ajitke Chattha had a population of 1,194 in 2017. It is located about 34.5 kilometres (21.4 mi) northwest of Gujranwala city via the Kalaske Cheema-Gujranwala road.

== Education ==
A government school is located in Ajitke Chattha. It is run by the Government of Punjab, Pakistan under the Board of Intermediate and Secondary Education, Gujranwala. For higher-level education, some students move to Kalaske Cheema, Dilawar Cheema and Ali Pur Chatta. For higher university level education, students move to Gujranwala, Gujrat, Pakistan and Lahore. Schools located in the village include:

- Government Girls Elementary School (GGES), Ajitke Chattha
- Government Boys Elementary School (GES), Ajitke Chattha

== Communication ==
The only way to get to Ajitke Chattha is by road. This village is directly connected to the Gujranwala-Ali Pur Chattha road. Besides driving a car, the only other method of transport near this village is a train. The Wazirabad-Faisalabad rail link is the only nearby railway line, and Rasool Nagar is the nearest railway station. The villagers share post office of Jham Wala.

== See also ==
- Dharam Kot
- Pindori Kalan
- Pindori Khurd
