= Peer Kot =

- Location within Pakistan
- Coordinates: 32°19′42″N 73°59′25″E
- Country: Pakistan
- Province: Punjab
- District: Gujranwala
- Time zone: UTC+5 (PST)
- Calling code: 055

Peer Kot (Urdu:پیرکوٹ) is a small village. in Wazirabad Tehsil, Gujranwala District, Punjab, Pakistan.

== Demography ==
Peer Kot has a population of over 7,000 and is located about 22 kilometers northwest of Gujranwala city. The population is over 99% Muslim. Most people in the town speak Punjabi, though almost all of them can also speak national language of Pakistan, Urdu. English is spoken by educated elite.

== Education ==
Only Government Primary School, Peer Kot is Source of education. But for higher education student join Government Boys Higher Secondary School, Ahmad Nagar Chattha and Government Girls Higher Secondary School, Ahmad Nagar Chattha, some private institutes

- Youth Group of Schools and Colleges, Ahmad Nagar Chattha
- Youth Institute of Technology, Ahmad Nagar Chattha (Computer Skills & Training Institute)
- Youth Academy, Ahmad Nagar Chattha (9th, 10th, F.sc, and I.C.S)

== Communication ==
The only way to get to Peer Kot is by road. Besides driving your own car (which takes about 30 minutes from Gujranwala or Wazirabad), one can also catch a bus or van from Gujranwala or Wazirabad to get there.

== Economy ==
Most people in the town work in agricultural related fields

== See also ==
- Gujranwala
- Ahmad Nagar
