= Bhooma batth =

Village in Gujranwala District, Punjab, Pakistan

- Village
- Location within Pakistan
- Coordinates: 32.16°N 73.51°E
- Country: Pakistan
- Province: Punjab
- District: Gujranwala
- Time zone: UTC+5 (PST)

Bhooma Batth, also spelled as Bhuman Bath, is a village near Kalaske Cheema and Kot Jehangir in Wazirabad Tehsil, Gujranwala District, Punjab, Pakistan.

== Demographics ==
According to the 2017 census, the population of the village was 5,544.
