= Kot Hara =

- Town
- Location within Pakistan
- Coordinates: 32.280°N 73.713°E
- Country: Pakistan
- Province: Punjab
- Time zone: UTC+5 (PST)

Kot Hara (Urdu: کوٹ ہرا, Punjabi: ہرے دا کوٹ), also known as "Haray Da Kot", is a village in Gujranwala District, Punjab Province in Pakistan, located on Pindi Bhattian road. It is centered at the intersection of Mandi Bahauddin Road and Wazirabad Road. Much of the occupants are Jatt Chatthas. Besides conventional agriculture, aquaculture is also practiced in the shape of fish farms in the vicinity of the village. It was a crossroads of local trade during the British Raj. The two main towns in its surroundings (Rasool Nagar, Alipur Chattha) are popular local markets or "Mandis" where the local producers sell their goods. About 10 km north west of the village lies the Qadirabad Headworks on the Chenab river, supplying water to the canals surrounding the village. The village has a government primary and middle school which also caters to students from the nearby village Madrassa Chattha.
