= Kalu Cheema =

- Location within Pakistan
- Coordinates: 32.3175°N 73.9825°E
- Country: Pakistan
- Province: Punjab
- District: Gujranwala

Population (2018)
  - Total: 5,000
- Time zone: UTC+5 (PST)
- Calling code: 055

Kalu Cheema (Urdu: کالوچیمہ) is a small village in Wazirabad Tehsil, Gujranwala District, Punjab, Pakistan. It is located behind Ahmad Nagar Chattha. It is almost 16 kilometres (9.9 mi) from Gujranwala City and 19 kilometres (12 mi) from Wazirabad.

== Demography ==
Kalu Cheema has a population of 2,000.

== Education ==
In Kalu Cheema, the Government Primary School Kalu Cheema is the only source of education. For higher education, students move to

- Government Boys Higher Secondary School, Ahmad Nagar Chattha
- Youth Group of Schools and Colleges, Ahmad Nagar Chattha

== See also ==
- Ahmad Nagar Chattha
- Gujranwala
