= Heosphora minimella =

Scientific classification
- Kingdom: Animalia
- Phylum: Arthropoda
- Class: Insecta
- Order: Lepidoptera
- Family: Pyralidae
- Genus: Heosphora
- Species: H. minimella

Binomial name
- Heosphora minimella Hampson, 1901

Synonyms
- Maliarpha minimella Hampson, 1901

Species of moth

Heosphora minimella is a species of moth in the family Pyralidae. The species was first described by George Hampson in 1901. It is found in Australia.
