= Heosphora desertella =

Scientific classification
- Domain: Eukaryota
- Kingdom: Animalia
- Phylum: Arthropoda
- Class: Insecta
- Order: Lepidoptera
- Family: Pyralidae
- Genus: Heosphora
- Species: H. desertella

Binomial name
- Heosphora desertella Hampson, 1918

Synonyms
- Saluria desertella Hampson, 1918

Species of moth

Heosphora desertella is a grass moth in the family Pyralidae. The species was first described by George Hampson as Saluria desertella in 1918. It is found in Australia.

Hampson describes the moth:

Head and thorax white tinged with rufous; abdomen white, dorsally fulvous yellow towards base; Fore wing tinged with ochreous, the cilia whiter. Hind wing white.
