= Gajar Gola railway station =

Railway station in Punjab, Pakistan

Coordinates: 32°11′N 73°46′E

Gajar Gola Railway Station گاجرگولہ ریلوے اسٹیشن

General information
- Owner: Ministry of Railways
- Line: Khanewal–Wazirabad Branch Line

Other information
- Station code: GGL

Services
Preceding station	Pakistan Railways	Following station
Hafizabad towards Khanewal Junction	Khanewal–Wazirabad Branch Line	Alipur Chatta towards Wazirabad Junction
Location

Gajar Gola Railway Station (Urdu: گاجرگولہ ریلوے اسٹیشن) is located in Gajar Gola village, Hafizabad district of Punjab province of the Pakistan.

== See also ==
- List of railway stations in Pakistan
- Pakistan Railways
