= Heosphora xylodes =

Scientific classification
- Domain: Eukaryota
- Kingdom: Animalia
- Phylum: Arthropoda
- Class: Insecta
- Order: Lepidoptera
- Family: Pyralidae
- Genus: Heosphora
- Species: H. xylodes

Binomial name
- Heosphora xylodes Turner, 1947

Synonyms
- Anerastria xylodes Turner, 1947

Species of moth

Heosphora xylodes is a moth in the family Pyralidae. The species was first described by Alfred Jefferis Turner in 1947. It is found in Australia.
