= Gobindgarh Fort =

Military fortress in Punjab, India

- Part of Amritsar
- Amritsar, Punjab, India
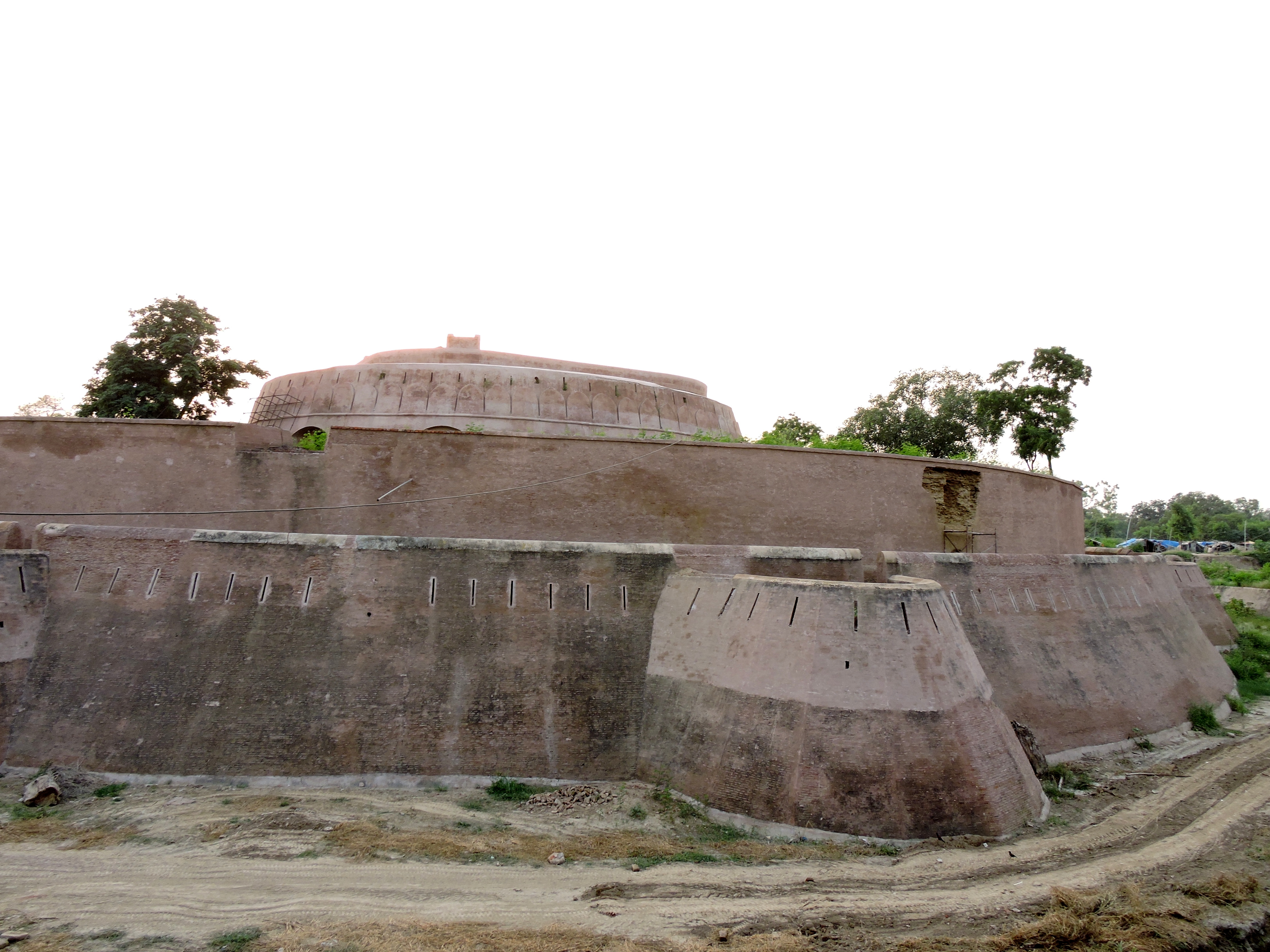
- Daytime view of the main Gobindgarh Fort

Site information
- Type: fort
- Controlled by: Punjab Government
- Open to the public: Yes
- Condition: Restored
- Website: Gobindgarh Fort

Location
- India
- Location within Punjab
- Coordinates: 31.6270583°N 74.8603111°E

Site history
- Built: 1760
- Built by: Gujjar Singh and Maharaja Ranjit Singh
- Materials: Brick and lime plaster

Gobindgarh Fort is a historic military fort located in the center of the city of Amritsar in the Indian state of Punjab. The Fort was until recently under the Indian Army, but was opened to the public on 10 February 2017. Today the fort is being developed as a museum and theme park, as a repository of Punjab’s history.

Popularly known as the Bhangian da Killa (fort of the Bhangis) after its 18th-century founder belonging to Bhangi Misl of Dhillon Jats rulers. Maharaja Ranjit Singh renamed it in the early 19th-century after the 10th Sikh guru, Guru Gobind Singh.

Gobindgarh Fort is located on the south west fringe of Amritsar, in a square pattern, with a perimeter of 1,000 m and made up entirely of bricks and lime. The fort had 25 cannons mounted on its ramparts and it remained with the Bhangi rulers till 1805. From the middle of the 19th century until Indian independence in 1947, it was occupied by the British army who made numerous defensive improvements to the fort to take account of technological advances in weaponry.

== History ==
Gobindgarh Fort was originally built by Dhillon Jat Misldar (militia chief) Gujjar Singh Banghi of Bhangi Misl, the local chieftain in the 18th century. Bhangi Misl was conquered and enhanced in the early 19th century by Maharaja Ranjit Singh who renamed it after the 10th Sikh guru, Guru Gobind Singh. The fort had five cannons which included the famous two Zamzama cannons. The structures built during this phase were the circular path in the center part of the innermost enclosure, Toshakhana (treasury), and Bastions. In 1805, Maharaja Ranjit Singh strengthened the fort. One of the main reasons to erect the fort was to save Harminder Sahib and the city from the invaders using the Grand Trunk road throughout the 18th century who often attacked the city for the purpose of looting. During this phase, the moat and gates were built using the initial mud foundations to a contemporary military defense structure inspired from French military fortress plans. The fort was renovated with help of a French architect. It is reported that Maharaja Ranjit Singh kept his treasure at the Toshakhana which included the famous Koh-i-Noor and supplies for an army of 2000 soldiers in the fort. In 1849, the British captured the fort and made significant changes. Also, significant changes were made to the bastions and gates as the new artillery technology was adopted.

== Fort ==
It is made of bricks and lime and is laid out in a square. Each of its corners has a parapet and two doors. It had 25 cannons mounted on its ramparts and has four bastions. The main entrance, Nalwa Gate, is named after Hari Singh Nalwa. Keller Gate is the back entrance. A tunnel runs towards Lahore. There were 25 cannons, originally, in the fort. The three bastions connected through a rampart depict positive values in the structure of a common thread. These include the spiritual basis for martial traditions, a multi-cultural ethos, progressive, creative and pragmatic perspective, resistance to tyranny and protection to weak. The buttresses can be functioning as a viewing platform for the parade of the troops and for ceremonial purposes. The bungalow around it was built for the fort commander, with bricks recycled from the earlier Sikh Building. The fort earlier had eight watch towers. Imam-ul-din (younger brother of the Foreign Minister of Lahore Kingdom) of fakir family of Lahore was in-charge of this fort. He was succeeded by his Taj-Ud-din as the Qiladar. The fort housed a coin minting house. Artilleries was also produced at the fort. Raja Dhian Singh, a minister in the court of Maharaja Ranjit Singh, had his residence at the fort. The fort held the grand wedding of Prince Nau Nihal Singh (the grandson of Maharaja Ranjit Singh) in 1837. The fort also had a watch tower which was fifty meters tall and completed in 1874. It was later demolished by the Indian Army after independence.

== Private company theme park ==
Punjabi government gave the fort to Mayanagri One Private Limited, who opened a theme park in 2017. Only two museums were kept in public hand. Numerous attractions have been added to make Qila Gobindgarh a live museum, along with exhibitions of Sikh martial history and the treasury of Maharaja Ranjit Singh.

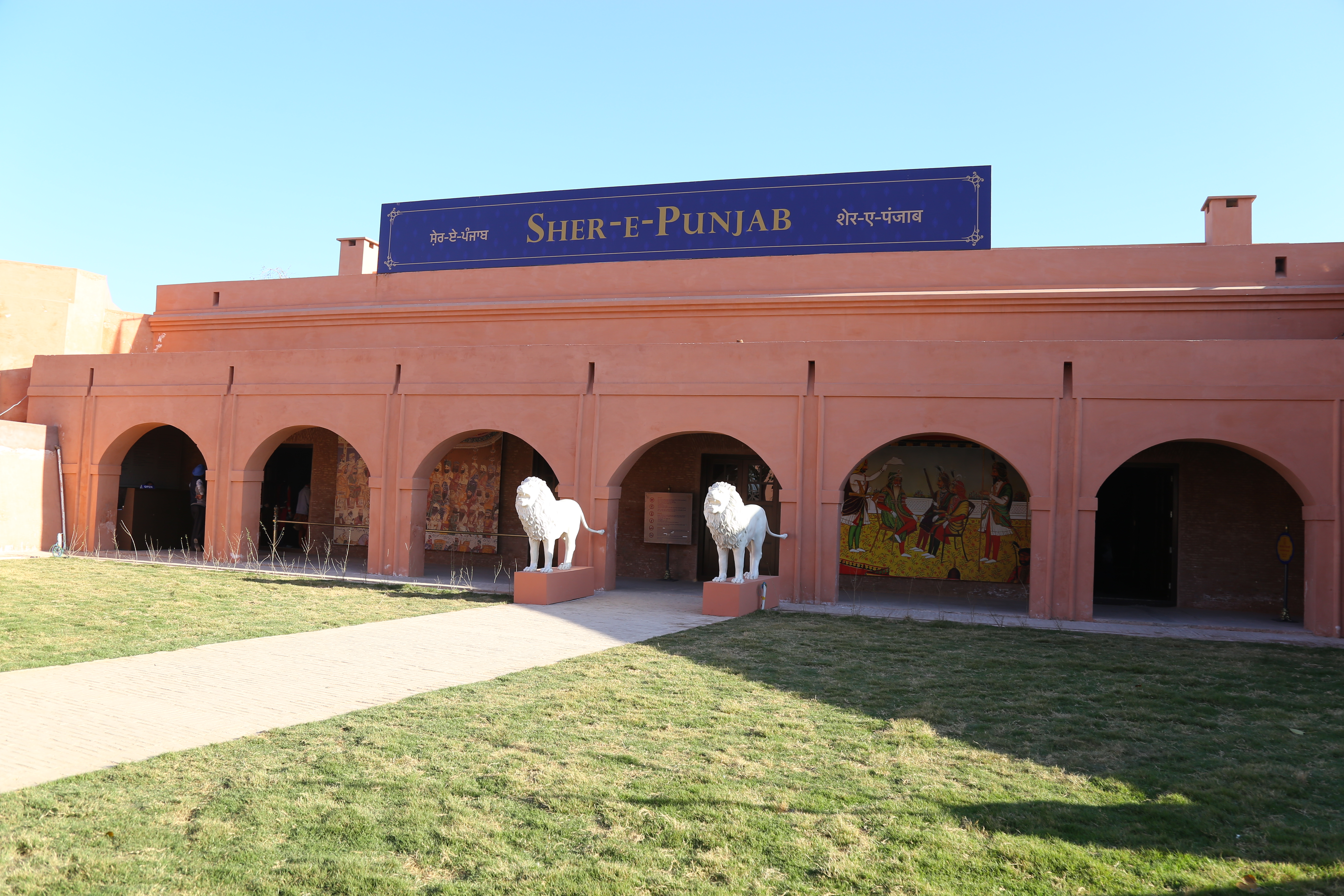
Sher e Punjab, main entrance.

Sher e Punjab - A 7D show based on the life of Maharaja Ranjit Singh that transports back to the 19th century.

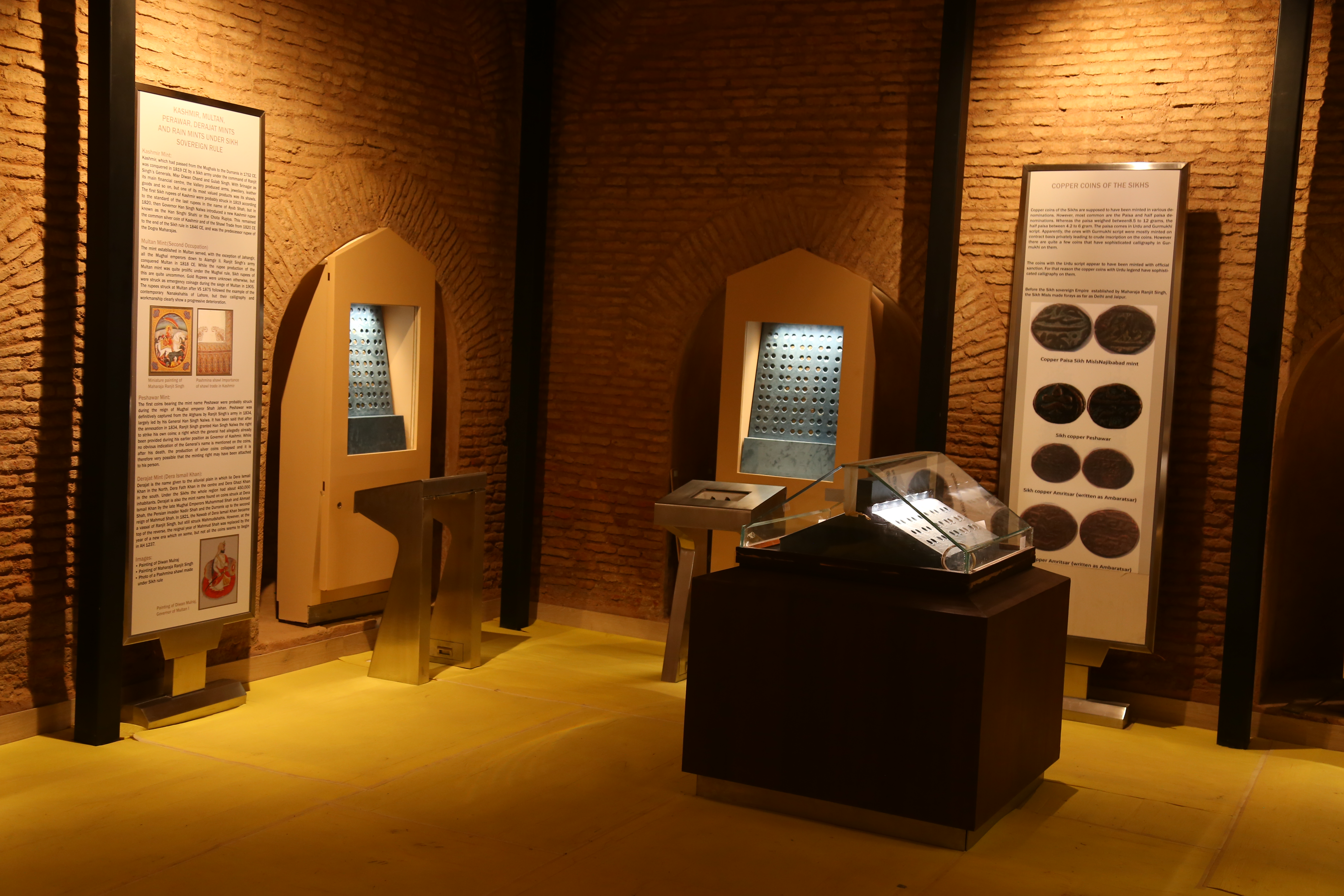
The Toshakhana, a coin museum.

Toshakhana - The Toshakhana, which once stored the coveted Kohinoor diamond, is now a coin museum for old and rare coins including a replica of the Kohinoor as it was worn by the Maharaja. The circular structure of the roof that was made by the use of the original nanakshahi brick is intact till date.

The Bungalow - The grand building of the Anglo Sikh Bungalow has now been converted to an ancient warfare museum and has several replicas of instruments, attires of warfare, and figurines.

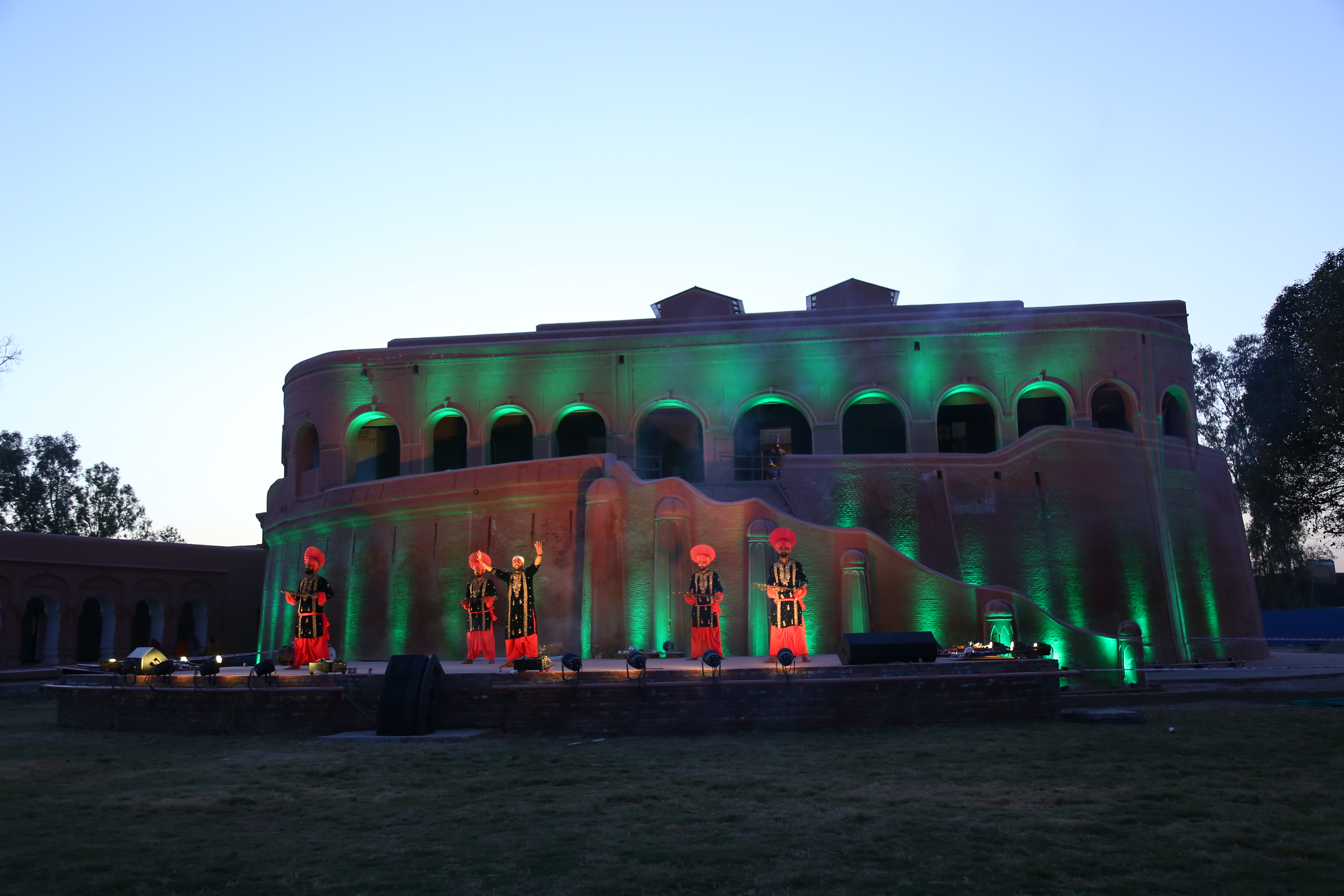
A stage with live performances.

Spirit of Punjab - A stage with live performances of bhangra, gatka, gidda, comedy, games, and dholi.

Ambarsari Zaika - Various food shops and stalls that offer Amritsari and Punjabi cuisine.

Haat Bazaar - The Haat Bazaar offers phulkaris, juttis, shawls, and antiques to be purchased. In partnership with Project Virasat, handmade brass and copper products made by the Thatheras of Jandiala Guru are also made available here.

Whispering Walls - Kanda Boldiyan Ne or Whispering Walls is a show using state of the art projection mapping technologies and laser lights. This show is held every evening post sunset. There is a Punjabi as well as an English show each day.

== Built interventions of the Sikh period ==
There cannot be made a clear line of distinction between the construction of fort walls and gates of the Bhangi period and Ranjit Singh’s period, but the Ravelins were defiantly a Maharaja Ranjit Singh period contribution. The fort had a two-tier system of fort walls and the Ravelins surrounded with a 5m deep moat. The double layer of forts walls at two levels provided for an efficient defense system. The fort walls were 10-12m thick having a mud infill as the core protected on both sides with Nanak shahi bricks in lime mortar. The thick mud walls acted as a thrust absorption wall in case of cannonball attacks. The flat terrain and the improved European artillery posed a greater threat and a challenge for the working of this fort. Maharaja Ranjit Singh had raised a Fuaz-i-khas with the help of the French Military officers by the year 1823. Along with the French warfare techniques, these officers brought along with them French contemporary fortification systems to support the same. The maharaja adopted these systems in Gobindgarh fort to strengthen the mud fort. The ravelin—as highlands sloping outwards, were constructed in front of the curtain fort walls. These provided the defender with a suitable position at a high point to place his cannon and get a wide range of the enemy at a lower level, while the enemy had his cannon at the disadvantageous position. Even if the enemy succeeded in climbing up the ravelins, they made easy target for the cannons at the rampart.

Circular plinth of the Bungalow

This building is positioned as almost the geometrical center of the fort complex. The central positioning indicates a prime building usage. The circular plinth is the only remains of the Sikh building, which in itself speaks volumes about its rich architectural legacy. It might have been a plinth to a very high conical building (suggested in accordance to similar contemporary buildings). It is a retaining high plinth supported by an outer masonry wall and highly ornate masonry buttress. These circular buttresses have a broader capital with three cornice bands of masonry. This projecting cornice band continues all over the circular wall at the plinth level. It has a mud infill with Nanak shahi bricks in lime mortar. The details of the ornamentation are in masonry. The surface might have had a lime plaster as the surface treatment.

Toshakhana

The building was originally built with Lime plaster. Toshakhana was built by Maharaja Ranjit Singh. The Toshakhana lies abutting the northern fort wall at the center. It is a square building divided into two chambers. The walls are supported by masonry ornate buttress (Burj). These buttresses are three faced tapering columnar supports with a domical capital. The two chambers have low vaulted roofs covered by a single vault above them—a double vault system. The 1.5m thick walls and vaults are constructed with Nanak shahi bricks in lime mortar. No evidence of original flooring can be seen Maharaja Ranjit Singh announced MislBeli Ram is in charge of Toshkhana in 1813 A.D. Adjacent to a building wall, rooms were built to accommodate soldiers. On the south side of the building, a lightning conduction system made of copper was found.

Bastions

There are four bastions at four cardinal points of the forts — strategically located to guard the fort. They are situated on a high circular plinth which forms the part of the rampart wall. They are conical heavy masonry bastions with a crenellation band running at the top level. At this point of time, the bastions might have been open to the sky.

Military Engineering

A long road from the Vijay Chowk entrance leads to the first historic gate, the Outer Gate. Crossing the two parts of the outer gate the road winds to the right and hits perpendicular to the Nalwa Gate (an elaborate double gate). The Nalwa Gate has a passageway to the lower lever of rampart as well. After crossing the Nalwa Gate, the road suddenly takes a sharp turn into the Inner gate. Through the inner gate, the road again winds and enters the court of the complex. The gates are thus positioned as checkpoints and sudden turns and winds in the road are purposely designed to incorporate surprise attacks on the approaching army. At every entrance, posts for the soldiers to defend and counterattack the enemy can be observed. Right outside the outer gate, the multiple lines of forces of attack come into play. The watch tower would have had troops positioned at an upper level in front of the gate and a cutout in the rampart across would have had a cannon positioned to fire at the approaching enemy. Thus multiple levels of lines of attack are designed. The bastion has a two-tier level of defense. The arched openings and the terrace together act as a double system of platforms for the attack.

== Built interventions of the British period ==
=== Roofing of bastions ===
After the British took charge of the fort in the mid 1850s, there was no threat of war against the controlling East India Company, except for some local uprisings which were small-scale affairs and not requiring the use of the fort as a military active complex. By 1859 the bastions came to be used primarily as barracks for housing soldiers. Since cannons were no longer fired in the bastions (with the impact of cannon fire thrust no longer a factor), they were instead used for accommodation. A conservation, management and reuse plan for Gobindgarh Fort was drawn up by the British, who then constructed roofs over the bastions. A changing political scenario triggered a change in building use, resulting in alterations in the form. The internal arched walls were then built upon in thinner sections repeating the arches below to raise the walls up to the desired terrace level. A typical madras roof—a traditional flat roof of wood beams, purlins, and tiles with mud terracing, originated from south India and adopted by British—was constructed. Skylights, with pitched roofing and centrally pivoted openings for ventilation with semicircular bulging jaali detail, were constructed to optimize the lighting conditions in these large barrack spaces.

Bungalow A circular Sikh building positioned almost at the center of the fort complex was either brought down during the capture of the fort or later — no evidence for the same can be found. However, it is noteworthy that it seems that the British pulled down the building above the plinth level and built the superstructure reusing the same materials. The central position of the building indicates its significance in the Sikh era, thus this act of building on top of the Sikh plinth was a political power statement. In 1864 a rectangular superstructure housing four officers quarters were built (a legend runs that this was Bungalow, but this cannot be verified). A grand colonial staircase was built with ornamental masonry buttress. It is a semi-spiral staircase on the eastern façade, while a service staircase is also present to the west side, but its year of construction cannot be determined. The design of the quarters was such that, all four quarters had individual entry and a verandah at the rear. Each quarter had 2-3 small habitable rooms. A cook house and 8 servant’s quarters are also recorded to have been in existence, although their evidence on site in the present context cannot be verified. According to records, it was built with the reuse of Nanak shahi bricks in mud mortar, the flooring was constructed of cement concrete, whereas the roofing was designed as a mud roof with flat tiles.

Darbar Hall

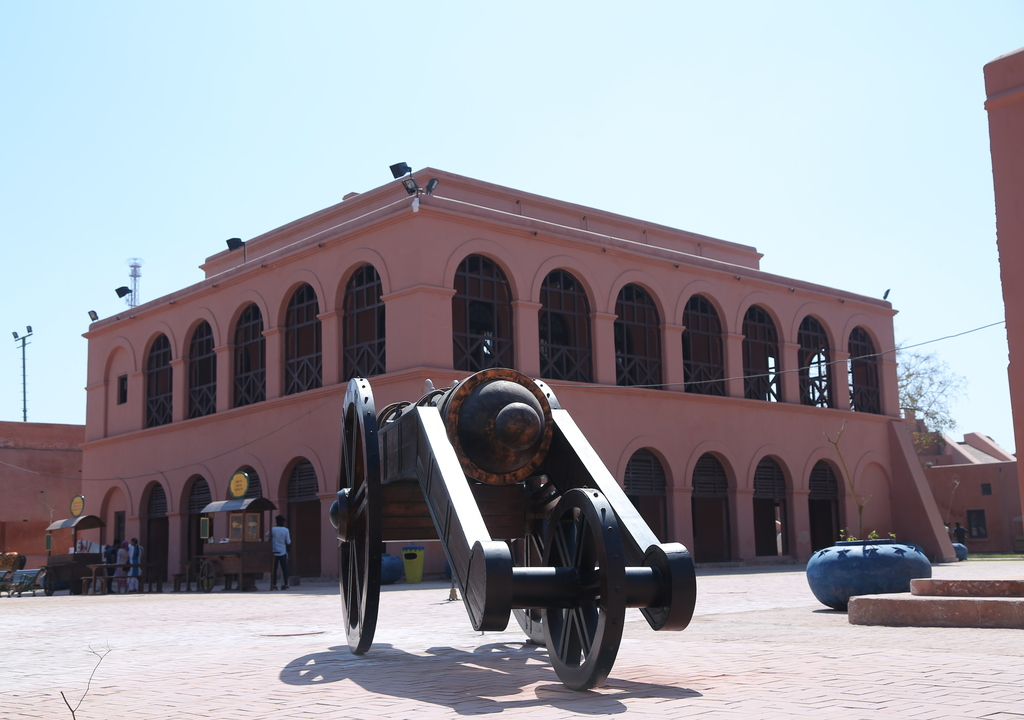
Darbar Hall- Gobindgarh Fort, Amritsar

The Durbar Hall lies to the east end almost on the center of the North-South axis. It is approached by the main road that leads from the inner gate. It lies to the south of this road and to the east of Bungalow. The plinth protection and the wooden louvers indicate that the entrance would have been from the west façade. As per records, it was built in 1850 as a six-bed hospital. It is a building of typical colonial design, rectangular double-storied with a colonnade verandah running all around on both the floors. The ground floor is divided into three bays of rooms further subdivided into two to three rooms. It has a high ceiling. A grand masonry staircase, with a wooden railing, leads to the upper floor. Although the ground floor could have been a hospital, the upper floor—with a huge hall and oval, glazed ornamental ventilators—does not conform to this type of use. The floor’s use and its period of construction are undetermined. With four fireplaces, it is a huge public hall that reflects a celebratory mood. The walls are of Nanak shahi bricks with mud mortar, although special bricks (especially cast bricks with beveled edges) were used in columns and plinth etc. the floors were of cement concrete. The verandahs had interesting wooden louvers and rails with bracings to guard against the tropical heat. Remnants of a pulley system indicate that curtains were installed for the same purpose. The roofing and intermediate floor were a system of wooden beams (specially carved edges) resting on wooden brackets, wooden purlins and brick tiles with mud infill terracing. The building’s columns may have had exposed gauge work, while the walls may have had lime plaster.

Barracks and Officers' Mess This building lies to the south of the bungalow in very close proximity. The scale of the original Sikh building might have been small and non-obtrusive to the Bungalow Sikh plinth, but the colonial additions disrupted the scale and size of the building such that it seems to hinder the appreciation of the circular Sikh plinth of the Bungalow. This building was built on the remnants of an old Sikh building, the thick north and south walls and the typical multi-foliated, arched ornamental openings verify the same. The central core rooms must have been of Sikh origin, which during the British period in 1850 was remodeled as a colonial building. This rectangular building, running in an east-west direction, was subdivided into smaller rooms. A colonnaded verandah was constructed to its west—again, a typical colonial feature to guard against the tropical heat. The building was used as a mess hall and barracks for officers (OR’s). The thick, Sikh period North-South walls are constructed of Nanak shahi bricks in lime mortar, whereas the British period walls are of nana shahi bricks in mud mortar. The original flooring is unknown, however in British times it was converted to cement concrete. The original masonry vault roofing, typical to Sikh period buildings, was replaced by an interesting wooden truss system with tiles and mud infill as the roof covering.

Chloronome house This building lies to the west of Durbar Hall and opposite to the mess hall. This is a colonial era building, built in 1853 (as per MES records-date of purchase/date of erection), which was used for the treatment and purification of water by chlorination. It is built next to a Sikh period well, which was used as a chlorinating tank. It has two rooms, one of which has a circular pit to house chlorination apparatus (a myth, however, holds it to be a Phasi ghar— hanging place). The structure also has a water tank mounted on the terrace, as part of the water treatment equipment. The building is constructed with modular bricks in mud mortar having cement concrete flooring and terraced on jack arches.

== Zamzama ==
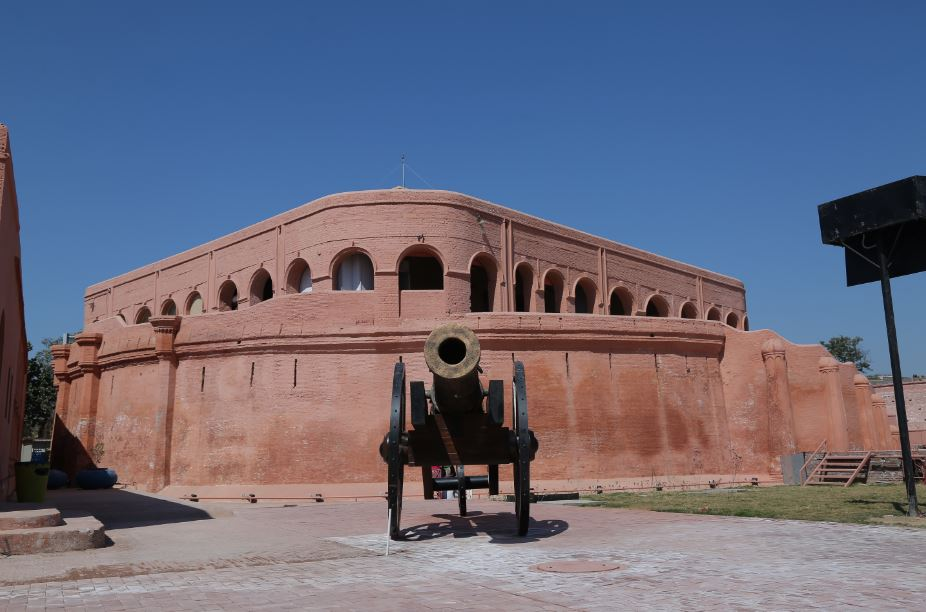
Replica of Zam-Zammah - Front View- Placed at Gobindgarh Fort, Amritsar

Bhangia-di-top or the gun belonging to the BhangiMisl, known as Zamzama, is a massive, heavyweight gun, an 80-pounder, 14 feet, 4 1/2 inches in length, with a bore aperture of 9 1/2 inches. This gun, one of the largest ever made in the sub-continent, was cast at Lahore along with another gun of the same size in 1757 by Shah Nazir (a metalsmith of the former Mughal viceroy ), under the directions of Shah Wali Khan, who was prime minister in the reign of the Afghan King Ahmed Shah Durrani. According to some writers, some metal was obtained through jizya, metal vessels having been taken from Hindu households in Lahore.

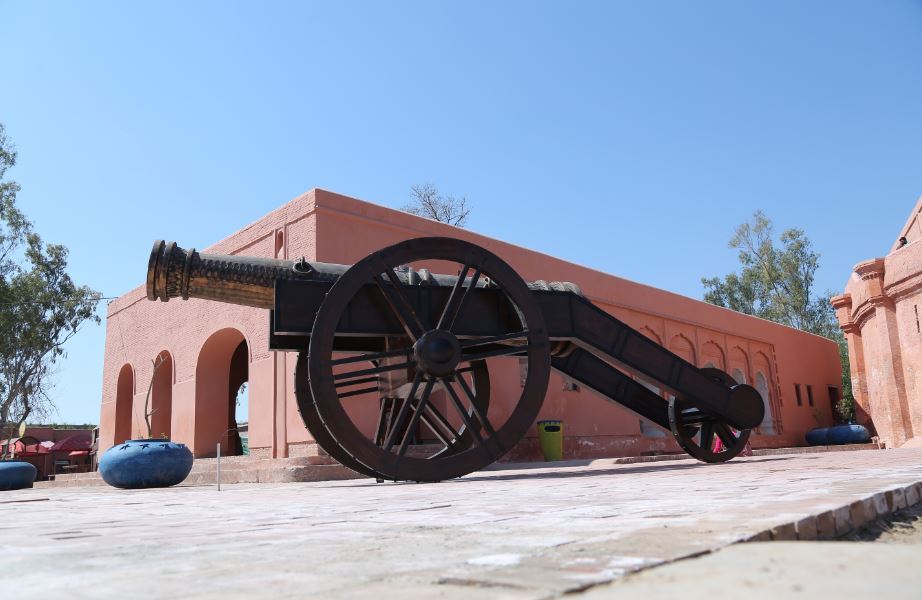
Replica of Zam-Zammah - Side View - at Gobindgarh Fort, Amritsar

The cannon bears two Persian inscriptions. The front one reads: "By the order of the Emperor [Ahmad Shah], DuriDurran, Shah Wali Khan wazir made the gun named Zamzama or the Taker of Strongholds." And the longer versified inscription reads: "A destroyer even of the strongholds of the heaven." In 1762, the Bhangi chief, Hari Singh, attacked Lahore and took possession of the cannon. It then came to be known as Bhangian di Top. In 1802, when Maharaja Ranjit Singh occupied Amritsar, the cannon fell into his hands. Ranjit Singh employed it in his campaigns of Daska, Kasur, Sujanpur, Wazirabad and Multan. It was transported to Multan in a specially built carriage during the siege of the citadel in 1810, but it failed to discharge.
