= Heosphora grammivena =

Scientific classification
- Domain: Eukaryota
- Kingdom: Animalia
- Phylum: Arthropoda
- Class: Insecta
- Order: Lepidoptera
- Family: Pyralidae
- Genus: Heosphora
- Species: H. grammivena

Binomial name
- Heosphora grammivena Hampson, 1918

Synonyms
- Saluria grammivena Hampson, 1918

Species of moth

Heosphora grammivena is a moth in the family Pyralidae. The species was first described by George Hampson in 1918. It is found in Australia.
