= Bega Khurd =

Pakistani village

- Village
- Location within Pakistan
- Coordinates: 32°16′41″N 73°59′17″E
- Country: Pakistan
- Province: Punjab
- District: Gujranwala

Area
  - Total: 1 km^{2} (0.39 sq mi)

Population
  - Estimate (2017): 469
- Time zone: UTC+5 (PST)
- Calling code: 055

Bega Khurd, also spelled Beega Khurd, is a small village located in Wazirabad Tehsil, of Gujranwala District, in Punjab, Pakistan.

== Demography ==
Bega Khurd, with a population of over 400, is situated approximately 28 kilometres northwest of Gujranwala city.

== Education ==
The village's government schools are operated by the Government of Punjab, under the Board of Intermediate and Secondary Education, Gujranwala. For a higher level of education, some student move to Kalaske Cheema and some to Ahmad Nagar Chattha. For university level education, students move to Gujranwala and Gujrat, Pakistan. Some private institute are also located in the area.

- Government Girls Primary School (GGPS), Bega Khurd
- Government Boys Primary School (GPS), Bega Khurd
- Some NGOs and people on their own are organizing various social development projects for prosperity and basic development of villagers.

Various overseas Pakistanis are funding the charity programs in order to supply basic needs of their people.

== Communication ==
The way to get Bega Khurd is by road, by car it takes about 37 minutes from Gujranwala. The Wazirabad-Faisalabad rail link is the only nearest railway line.

== See also ==
- Hassan Wali
- Bara Pind
