= Zamzama =

18th-century large-bore cannon

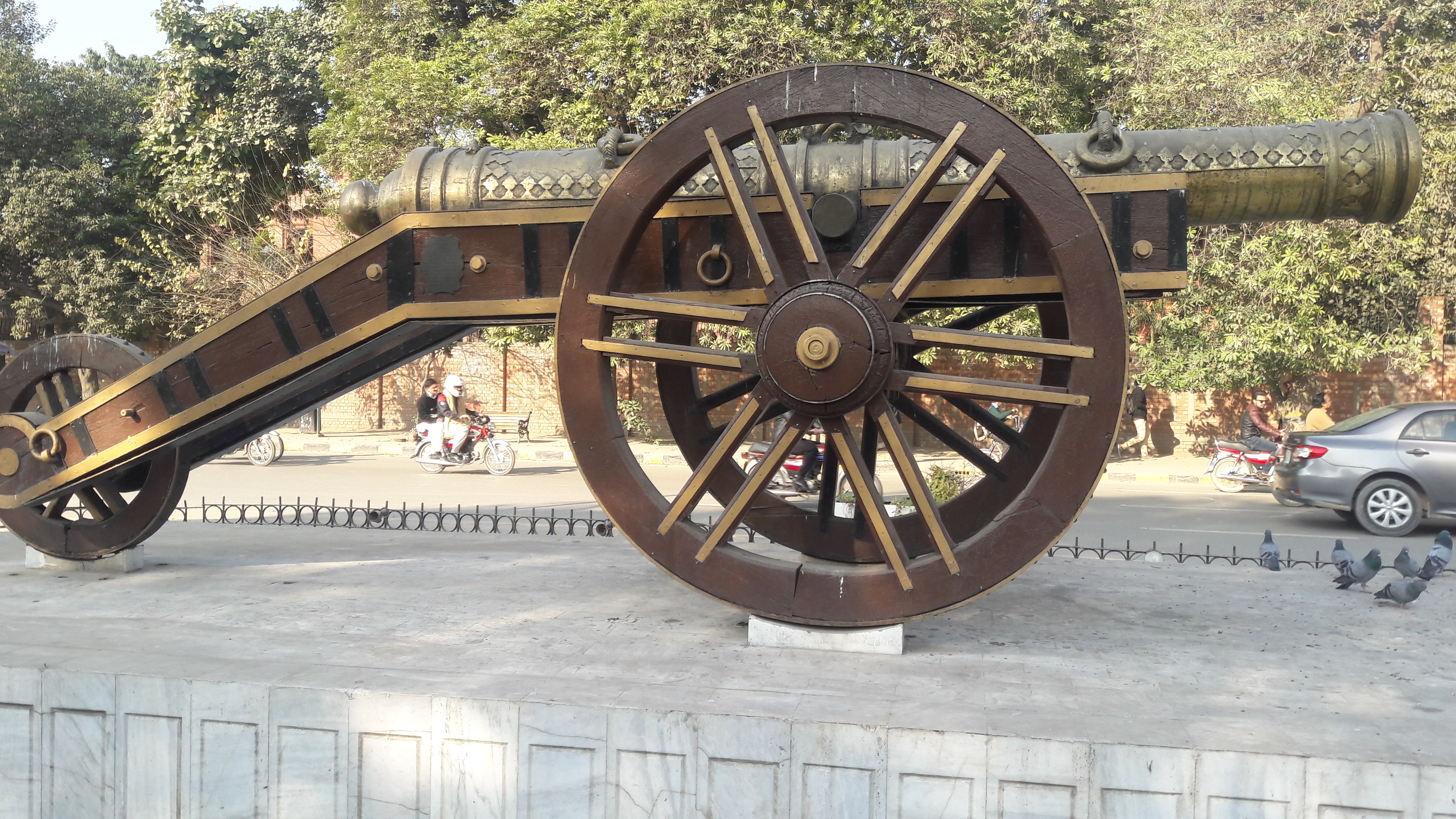
- Zamzama Gun at the entrance of Lahore Museum
- Type: Bombard
- Place of origin: Lahore, Durrani Empire

Service history
- In service: 1761–1818
- Used by: Durrani Empire; Bhangi Misl; Chattha Jats; Sikh Empire
- Wars: Battle of Panipat (1761); Siege of Multan (1818)

Production history
- Designer: Shah Nazir
- Manufacturer: Imperial Mughal karkhana, Mughalpura
- Produced: 1757–1760 (268–269 years ago)
- No. built: 2

Specifications
- Mass: 4,500 kg (9,900 lb)
- Length: 4.3 metres
- Diameter: 24 centimetres
- Shell weight: 40 kg (88 lb)
- Caliber: 240 mm (9.4 in)

The Zamzama Gun, (Note: Urdu: زمزمہ, lit. 'thunder' or 'roar', sometimes spelt "Zam-Zammah") also known as Kim's Gun and Bhangian di Top, (Note: Punjabi: بھنگیاں دی توپ, romanized: Bhaṅgīāṅ dī Top, lit. 'Cannon of the Bhangis') is an 18th-century large-bore cannon. It was cast by the metalsmith Shah Nazir of Lahore in about 1757, during the Durrani period. Currently on display in front of the Lahore Museum in Lahore, Pakistan, it is one of the largest pre-modern cannons in the world.

== Description ==
The gun is 4.3 metres (170 inches) in length, with a bore at its aperture of 240 millimetres (9 1/2 inches) and weighs over 4,500 kg (9,900 lb). The gun, one of the largest ever made in the Indian subcontinent, was cast at Lahore along with another gun of the same size in 1757 by Shah Nazir (a metalsmith of the former Mughal viceroy of Lahore Subah, Muin-ul-Mulk), under the directions of Shah Wali Khan, who was the Vizier of Durrani ruler, Ahmad Shah.

The copper and bronze needed to manufacture the cannon was obtained by melting household utensils collected from the Hindu and Sikh citizens of Lahore after imposing jizyah. Shah Nazir completed the both massive cannons within three months at his karkhana in Mughalpura, where now Moghalpura Railway Workshops are located. The gun has the date of manufacture, name of the monarch and the technician along with verses in Persian moulded with floral patterns all over the barrel. The front inscription reads: "By order of the Emperor Durri Dowran Shah Wali Khan, the Wazir made this gun, named Zamzama, the capturer of strongholds. The work of Shah Nazir."

The longer inscription at the back eulogizes its bulk and invincibility: "A destroyer even of the strongholds of heaven." Verses at the end of the inscription contain a chronogram, with the last line giving a date of 1755–56:

"From reason I enquire of the year of its manufacture;

Struck with terror it replied,

'Wert thou willing to surrender thine life,

I would unfold unto thee the secret.'

I agreed, and it said, laden with innuendo: –

'What a cannon! 'Tis a mighty fire dispensing dragon!'"

== War service ==
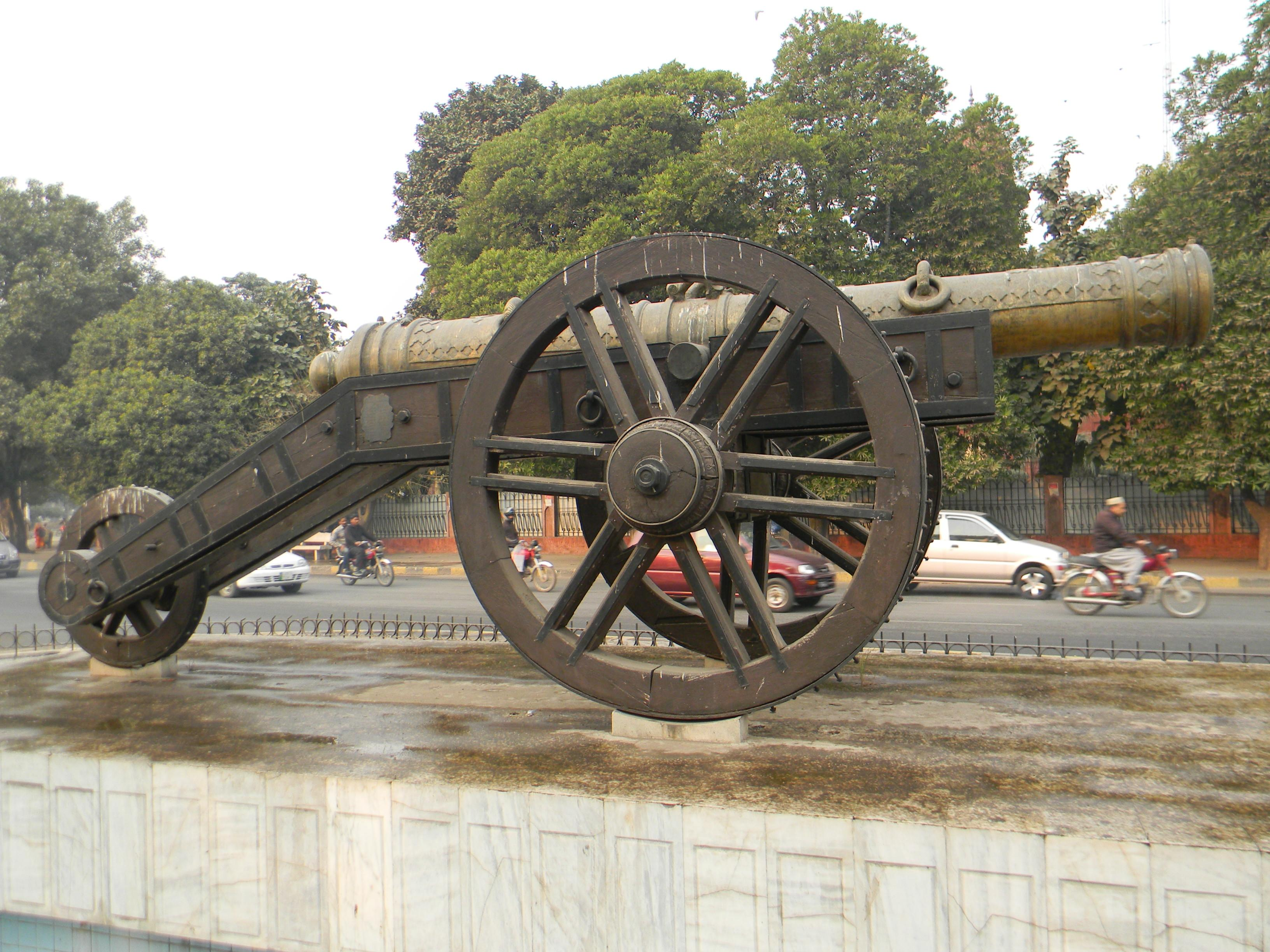
Zamzama Gun on display in Lahore

The gun saw its first action in the battle of Panipat, on 14 January 1761. After the battle, on his way back to Kabul, Ahmad Shah left it at Lahore with his governor, Khawaja Ubed, as the carriage that was supposed to take the gun to Kabul was not ready. The other gun which he took with him was lost during the passage through River Chenab.

In 1762, the Bhangi Sardar Hari Singh went into battle with Khawaja Ubed. Bhangi attacked the then village of Khawaja Said, 3.2 kilometres (2 mi) from Lahore (now a locality in the city of Lahore), where Khawaja Ubed had his arsenal, and seized his artillery, arms and ammunition, including the Zamzama Gun. It was renamed by its Sikh captors as Bhangian di Top.

For the next two years, it lay in the Shah Burj of the Lahore Fort. Thereafter, Sikh leaders Lehna Singh and Gujjar Singh Bhangi got hold of it after capturing Lahore and it was given to Charat Singh Shukerchakia as his share in the spoils. The Bhangi Sardars thought that Charat Singh would not be able to carry the gun with him and it would remain with them. Contrary to their expectations, Charat Singh successfully carried the gun to his fort at Gujranwala.

From Charat Singh, Zamzama was snatched by the Chatthas who took it to Ahmadnagar where it became a bone of contention between the brothers Ahmad Khan Chatha and Pir Muhammad Chattha. In the fight that ensued, two sons of Ahmad Khan and one of Pir Muhammad were killed. In this fight Gujjar Singh Bhangi sided with Pir Muhammad, and after the latter's victory, the gun was restored to Gujjar Singh. After two years, the gun was wrested by Charat Singh Shukerchakia from whom it was once again snatched by the Chatthas in 1772, and carried away to Rasulnagar.

Next year, Jhanda Singh Bhangi defeated the Chatthas and brought the gun to Amritsar. The cannon was used by Bhangis at least once during the battle of Dinanagar in 1775. In 1802, Ranjit Singh, after defeating the Bhangis, got hold of the gun. He used it in the battles of Daska, Kasur, Sujanpur, Wazirabad and Multan.

During the siege of Multan, Zamzama was fired four times, and made two breaches in the walls of Multan Fort. From one of the breaches the Sikh army entered into the fort on 20 June 1818, and the fort fell. However, the gun was badly damaged after firing these shots.

== Decommissioning ==
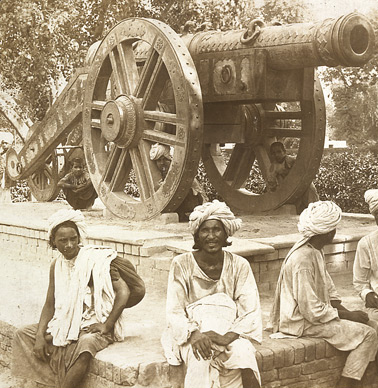
"Kim's Gun" as seen in 1903

After being severely damaged Zamzama had to be brought back to Lahore, but was found unfit for any further use. It was placed outside Delhi Gate, Lahore, where it remained until 1860. When in 1864, Maulawi Nur Ahmad Chishti compiled the Tahqiqat-i-Chishti, he found it standing in the Baradari of the garden of Wazir Khan, behind the Lahore Museum.

In 1870, it found a new asylum at the entrance of the Lahore Museum, then located in the Tollinton Market. It was placed in this position on the occasion of the Duke of Edinburgh's visit to Lahore in 1870. When the present building of the museum was constructed it was removed further west and placed opposite the University Hall.

Repaired in 1977, the cannon now rests on Mall Road with Pharmacy Department, University of the Punjab on one side, and National College of Arts (NCA) and Lahore Museum on the other.

== In literature and popular culture ==
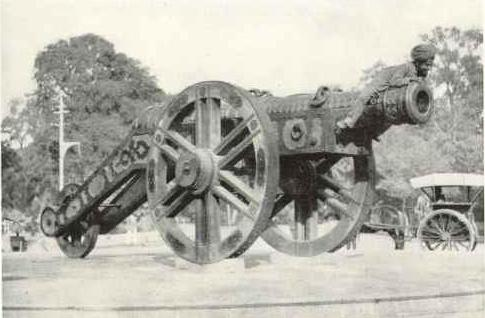
Zamzama cannon, photographed in 1921.

It came to be known as Kim's Gun after the protagonist in the novel Kim by Rudyard Kipling, in whose childhood memoirs it is frequently mentioned. The novel opens with Kim straddling the gun:

"He sat, in defiance of municipal orders, astride the gun Zam-Zammah on her brick platform opposite the old Ajaib-Ghar – the Wonder House, as the natives call the Lahore museum. Who hold Zam-Zammah, that ‘fire-breathing dragon’, hold the Punjab, for the great green-bronze piece is always first of the conqueror’s loot."

— Rudyard Kipling, Kim

Zamzama's status as a "mighty fire dispensing dragon" caused a great deal of amusement at the Durrani court, giving rise to many crude puns. "Zamzama" is now a joking term for a man with considerable sexual prowess in Afghanistan.

A life-size replica of the gun is displayed at the Gobindgarh Fort in Amritsar. A demi-cannon named after Zamzama features in the 2024 Skull and Bones video game.

== See also ==
- Mughal artillery

== Sources ==
- Latif, Syad Muhammad (1892). "The Zamzama Gun". Lahore: Its History, Architectural Remains and Antiquities. Lahore: New Imperial Press. pp. 383–385. OCLC 28302540.
