= Heosphora achromatella =

Scientific classification
- Kingdom: Animalia
- Phylum: Arthropoda
- Clade: Pancrustacea
- Class: Insecta
- Order: Lepidoptera
- Family: Pyralidae
- Genus: Heosphora
- Species: H. achromatella

Binomial name
- Heosphora achromatella (Hampson, 1918)

Synonyms
- Polyocha achromatella Hampson, 1918

Species of moth

Heosphora achromatella is a species of moth in the family Pyralidae. The species was first described by George Hampson in 1918. It occurs in Australia.
