= Nur Muhammad Chattha =

18th-century Punjabi Muslim chieftain

- Chaudhry; Sardar; Zamindar

Sardar of Wazirabad and Hafizabad
- Reign: 1750 – 1765
- Predecessor: Position established
- Successor: Pir Muhammad Chattha
- Born: 1704
- Died: 1775 (aged 70–71)
- Dynasty: Chattha
- Religion: Sunni Islam

Nur Muhammad Chattha (Punjabi:نور محمد چٹھہ; 1704–1765) was an 18th-century Punjabi Muslim chieftain of the Chattha clan of Jats in the region of Gujranwala, Punjab.

A prominent figure during the waning years of Mughal authority in the region, Chattha rose to power by resisting the central control of Mir Mannu, the Mughal governor of Lahore, establishing the independent rule.

== Rise to power ==
When he grew up his friendship was sought by Raja Ranjit Dev of Jammu and by the chiefs of Multan ; for the Chatthas had now grown powerful, and Nur Muhammed was their acknowledged chief.

Nur Muhammad Chattha emerged as a key political and military leader in Punjab amid the decline of Mughal influence. Around 1750, he asserted independence from Mir Mannu and established rule over parts of present-day Hafizabad and Gujranwala District.

== Legacy ==
Nur Muhammad Chattha is credited with founding the towns of Ahmadnagar, Ghudi Gul Muhammad, and Rasulnagar, which later became significant during the Sikh campaigns in Punjab.

He was succeeded by his sons as he grew too old, Ahmad Khan Chattha and Pir Muhammad Chattha who continued resistance against the expanding Sikh Misls. He died in 1775.

== See also ==
- Chattha (clan)
- Pir Muhammad Chattha
- History of Punjab
- Gujranwala District
