= Heosphora leuconeura =

Scientific classification
- Domain: Eukaryota
- Kingdom: Animalia
- Phylum: Arthropoda
- Class: Insecta
- Order: Lepidoptera
- Family: Pyralidae
- Genus: Heosphora
- Species: H. leuconeura

Binomial name
- Heosphora leuconeura Turner, 1913

Synonyms
- Poujadia leuconeura Turner, 1913

Species of moth

Heosphora leuconeura is a moth in the family Pyralidae. The species was first described by Alfred Jefferis Turner in 1913, as Poujadia leuconeura from a specimen collected in Darwin in the month of March. The species epithet, leuconeura, describes the moth as being "white-nerved". It is found in Australia.
