= Heosphora neurica =

Scientific classification
- Kingdom: Animalia
- Phylum: Arthropoda
- Clade: Pancrustacea
- Class: Insecta
- Order: Lepidoptera
- Family: Pyralidae
- Genus: Heosphora
- Species: H. neurica

Binomial name
- Heosphora neurica Turner, 1913

Synonyms
- Hypsotropha neurica Turner, 1913

Species of moth

Heosphora neurica is a moth in the family Pyralidae. The species was first described by Alfred Jefferis Turner in 1913. It is found in Australia.
