= Dehla Chattha =

- Village
- Location in Pakistan
- Coordinates: 32°15′00″N 73°58′11″E
- Country: Pakistan
- Province: Punjab
- Capital: Gujranwala

Population
  - Total: Over 10,000

Dehla Chattha (Urdu: چٹھا, Punjabi: ਚੱਠਾ), also spelled Dehla Chatha, is a village on Alipur Chatha Road, in Wazirabad Tehsil, in Gujranwala District, Punjab, Pakistan.

It is situated midway between Gujranwala and Alipur Chatha, 20 km from Gujranwala, 15 km from Alipur Chatha and 3 kilometers from Kalaske Cheema towards Alipur Chatha.
