= Jalalpur Chattha =

Village in Punjab, Pakistan

Jalalpur Chattha جلال پور چٹھہ Chuattiyan
- Village
- Interactive map of Jalalpur Chattha
- Coordinates: 32°15′09″N 73°43′00″E
- Country: Pakistan
- Province: Punjab
- District: Gujranwala District
- Tehsil: Wazirabad Tehsil

Population (2017)
  - Total: ~7,000
- Time zone: UTC+05:00 (PKT)

Jalalpur Chattha (جلال پور چٹھہ), also known as Chuattiyan (چواتیاں), is a village in Wazirabad Tehsil, Gujranwala District, Punjab, Pakistan. It is the southernmost village in the district, bordering Gujrat District. The village had an estimated population of around 7,000 at the time of the 2017 census.

== Etymology ==
The name "Jalalpur Chattha" combines "Jalalpur," likely referring to a historical founder or landowner named Jalal, with "Chattha," denoting its association with the local Chattha community. It is alternatively recorded as "Chuattiyan" in some administrative documents.

== History ==
Jalalpur Chattha is a revenue village in Wazirabad Tehsil and has been documented as a rural settlement since the British colonial period. It was incorporated into Pakistan following the 1947 Partition.

== Geography ==
Jalalpur Chattha is located at 32°15′09″N 73°43′00″E, approximately 20 km south of Wazirabad town and close to the Chenab River. Nearby villages include Sooianwala Chattha, Madrassa Chattha, and Kot Hara.

== Demographics ==
The predominant language is Punjabi (Majhi dialect).

== Economy ==
Agriculture is the main economic activity, with major crops including wheat, rice, sugarcane, and cotton.

== See also ==
- Wazirabad Tehsil
- Gujranwala District
