= Heosphora psamathella =

Scientific classification
- Kingdom: Animalia
- Phylum: Arthropoda
- Clade: Pancrustacea
- Class: Insecta
- Order: Lepidoptera
- Family: Pyralidae
- Genus: Heosphora
- Species: H. psamathella

Binomial name
- Heosphora psamathella (Meyrick, 1879)

Synonyms
- Anerastia psamathella Meyrick, 1879

Species of moth

Heosphora psamathella is a moth in the family Pyralidae. The species was first described by Edward Meyrick in 1879 as Anerastia psamathella from a male specimen collected in Sydney, New South Wales, and was moved to the genus Heosphora as its type species in 1882. It is found in Australia.
