= Heosphora anaemopis =

Scientific classification
- Domain: Eukaryota
- Kingdom: Animalia
- Phylum: Arthropoda
- Class: Insecta
- Order: Lepidoptera
- Family: Pyralidae
- Genus: Heosphora
- Species: H. anaemopis

Binomial name
- Heosphora anaemopis Turner, 1913

Species of moth

Heosphora anaemopis is a species of moth in the family Pyralidae. It was first described by Alfred Jefferis Turner in 1913.
