= Dharam Kot =

Pakistani village

Dharam Kot Nawan Kot
- Village
- Location within Pakistan
- Coordinates: 32°16′56″N 73°52′44″E
- Country: Pakistan
- Province: Punjab
- District: Gujranwala

Area
  - Total: 2.17 km^{2} (0.84 sq mi)

Population
  - Estimate (2017): 793
- Time zone: UTC+5 (PST)
- Calling code: 055

Dharam Kot, also known as Nawan Kot, is a small village in Wazirabad Tehsil, Gujranwala District, Punjab, Pakistan.

== Demography ==
Dharam Kot, with a population of over 700, is situated approximately 29 kilometres northwest of Gujranwala city.

== Education ==
For education in the village a Government Schools are functional by Government of Punjab, Pakistan under Board of Intermediate and Secondary Education, Gujranwala. For higher school and college education some students move to Rasool Nagar and Kalaske Cheema. For university level education students move to Gujranwala and Gujrat, Pakistan. While some private institute also functions in the area.

- Government Girls Primary School (GGPS), Dharam Kot
- Government Boys Primary School (GPS), Dharam Kot

== Communication ==
The only way to get Dharam Kot is by road. The Dharam Kot is directly connected with Rasool Nagar. Besides driving your own car (which takes about 50 minutes from Gujranwala, 15 minutes from Kalaske Cheema). The Wazirabad-Faisalabad rail link is the only nearest railway line and Rasool Nagar is the nearest railway station.

== See also ==
- Kot Asaish
- Bega Khurd
- Bega Kalan
