= Pandori Jagir =

- Village
- Location in Punjab, India Pandori Jagir (India)
- Coordinates: 31.0859388°N 75.5155704°E
- Country: India
- State: Punjab
- District: Jalandhar

Government
  - Type: Panchayat raj
  - Body: Gram panchayat
- Elevation: 240 m (790 ft)

Population (2011)
  - Total: 711
- Sex ratio 372/339 ♂/♀

Languages
  - Official: Punjabi
- Time zone: UTC+5:30 (IST)
- PIN: 144044
- Telephone: 01821
- ISO 3166 code: IN-PB
- Post Office: Sidhwan R.S.
- Website: jalandhar.nic.in

Pandori Jagir is a village in Jalandhar district of Punjab state, India. It is located 2.6 km from the postal head office in Sidhwan R.S., 5.7 km from Nurmahal, 32.9 km from the district headquarters at Jalandhar and 138 km from the state capital at Chandigarh. The village is administrated by a sarpanch who is an elected representative of the village as per Panchayati raj (India).

== Transport ==
Nurmahal railway station is the nearest train station; however, Phillaur Junction train station is 32 km away from the village. The village is 42 km away from domestic airport in Ludhiana and the nearest international airport is located in Chandigarh also Sri Guru Ram Dass Jee International Airport is the second nearest airport which is 122 km away in Amritsar.
