= Pandori, Bhulath =

Pandori
- Village
- Location in Punjab, India Pandori (India)
- Coordinates: 31.523605°N 75.505450°E
- Country: India
- State: Punjab
- District: Kapurthala

Government
  - Type: Panchayati raj (India)
  - Body: Gram panchayat

Population (2011)
  - Total: 2,349
- Sex ratio 1211/1138♂/♀

Languages
  - Official: Punjabi
  - Other spoken: Hindi
- Time zone: UTC+5:30 (IST)
- PIN: 144401
- Telephone code: 01822
- ISO 3166 code: IN-PB
- Vehicle registration: PB-09
- Website: kapurthala.gov.in

Pandori is a village in Bhulath Tehsil in Kapurthala district of Punjab State, India. It is located 2 kilometres (1.2 mi) from Bhulath, 23 kilometres (14 mi) away from district headquarter Kapurthala. The village is administrated by a Sarpanch, who is an elected representative.

== Demography ==
According to the report published by Census India in 2011, Pandori has 486 houses with the total population of 2,349 persons of which 1,211 are male and 1,138 females. Literacy rate of Pandori is 74.17%, lower than the state average of 75.84%. The population of children in the age group 0–6 years is 235 which is 10.00% of the total population. Child sex ratio is approximately 780, lower than the state average of 846.

== Population data ==
Particulars	Total	Male	Female
Total No. of Houses	486	-	-
Population	2,349	1,211	1,138
Child (0-6)	235	132	103
Schedule Caste	307	152	155
Schedule Tribe	0	0	0
Literacy	74.17 %	79.61 %	68.50 %
Total Workers	661	577	84
Main Worker	617	0	0
Marginal Worker	44	32	12

As per census 2011, 661 people were engaged in work activities out of the total population of Pandori which includes 577 males and 84 females. According to census survey report 2011, 93.34% workers (Employment or Earning more than 6 Months) describe their work as main work and 6.66% workers are involved in Marginal activity providing livelihood for less than 6 months.

== Caste ==
The village has schedule caste (SC) constitutes 13.07% of total population of the village and it doesn't have any Schedule Tribe (ST) population.

== List of cities near the village ==
- Bhulath
- Kapurthala
- Phagwara
- Sultanpur Lodhi

== Air travel connectivity ==
The closest International airport to the village is Sri Guru Ram Dass Jee International Airport.
