= Verpal Chattha =

Town and Union Council in Wazirabad Tehsil

Verpal Chattha ورپال چٹھہ
- Village
- Location of Verpal Chattha Verpal Chattha (Pakistan)
- Coordinates: 32°25′41″N 73°8′9″E
- Country: Pakistan
- Province: Punjab
- District: Wazirabad
- Tehsil: Alipur Chattha
- Number of Union Councils: 1

Government
  - Chairman: Muhammad Nazir Chattha

Area
  - Total: 1.59 sq mi (4.12 km^{2})

Population
  - Estimate (2017): 13,503
- Time zone: UTC+05:00 (Pakistan Standard Time)
- Calling code: 055

Verpal Chattha (Urdu: ورپال چٹھہ), also spelled as Warpal Chattha, is a town and Union Council in Gujranwala District, Punjab, Pakistan. The town is a part of the Wazirabad Tehsil subdivision of the district.

== See also ==
- Wazirabad
