= Ahmedabad, Punjab =

Mandi Ahmed Abad احمد آباد منڈی
- City
- Location in Punjab, Pakistan
- Coordinates: 30.65444°N 74.03148°E
- Country: Pakistan
- Province: Punjab
- District: Okara
- Tehsil: Depalpur
- Established: 1993

Government
  - Type: Municipal Committee in Tehsil Depalpur
- Time zone: UTC+5 (PST)
- Area code: 044-

Mandi Ahmed Abad (Punjabi, Urdu: احمد آبادمنڈی), previously called Mandi Hira Singh, is a city and Municipal Committee of Depalpur Tehsil in Okara District in the Punjab province of Pakistan. This city was renamed in 1993 by the Government of the Punjab after Mirza Ahmed Baig MNA father of Mirza Ali Raza Baig Ex City Nazim and MPA who is a local politician. It is a Union Council, an administrative subdivision, of Depalpur Tehsil and Mirza Ahmad Baig was the member of the District counsel that time.
