= Akmal Saif Chatha =

Pakistani politician

Member of the Provincial Assembly of the Punjab
- In office 29 May 2013 – 31 May 2018

Personal details
- Born: 8 November 1973 (age 53) Alipur Chatha
- Party: Pakistan Muslim League (N)

Akmal Saif Chatha is a Pakistani politician who was a Member of the Provincial Assembly of the Punjab, from 2003 to 2007 and again from May 2013 to May 2018.

== Early life and education ==
He was born on 8 November 1973 in Alipur Chatha.

He graduated in 1992 from Forman Christian College and holds a degree of Bachelor of Arts.

== Political career ==
He was elected to the Provincial Assembly of the Punjab as a candidate of Pakistan Muslim League (J) (PML-J) from Constituency PP-103 (Gujranwala-XIII) in by-polls held in January 2013. He received 333,43 votes and defeated an independent candidate Shaukat Hayat Chattha.

He was re-elected to the Provincial Assembly of the Punjab as a candidate of Pakistan Muslim League (N) from Constituency PP-103 (Gujranwala-XIII) in the 2013 Pakistani general election. He received 41,453 votes and defeated Muhammad Ahmed Chatha, a candidate of PML-J.

In December 2013, he was appointed as Parliamentary Secretary for environment.
