= Heosphora =

Scientific classification
- Kingdom: Animalia
- Phylum: Arthropoda
- Clade: Pancrustacea
- Class: Insecta
- Order: Lepidoptera
- Family: Pyralidae
- Genus: Heosphora; Meyrick, 1882

Type species
- Anerastia psamathella Meyrick, 1879

Synonyms
- Talamba Ragonot, 1888; Erythphlebia Hampson, 1901

Genus of moths

Heosphora is a genus of moths in the family Pyralidae. The genus was first described by Edward Meyrick in 1882. Heosphora species are found in Australia, except for Heosphora tenuinervella which is known from the East Indies.

== Species ==
The species in this genus are:

- Heosphora ablepta (Turner, 1913)
- Heosphora achromatella (Hampson, 1918)
- Heosphora anaemopis (Turner, 1913)
- Heosphora baliora (Turner, 1913)
- Heosphora colobela (Turner, 1947)
- Heosphora desertella (Hampson, 1918)
- Heosphora enervella (Hampson, 1901)
- Heosphora erasmia (Turner, 1913)
- Heosphora grammivena (Hampson, 1918)
- Heosphora leuconeura (Turner, 1913)
- Heosphora minimella (Hampson, 1901)
- Heosphora neurica (Turner, 1913)
- Heosphora psamathella (Meyrick, 1879)
- Heosphora rhodochros (Turner, 1947)
- Heosphora tanybela (Turner, 1947)
- Heosphora tenuinervella (Ragonot, 1888)
- Heosphora virginella (Meyrick, 1879)
- Heosphora xylodes (Turner, 1947)
