= Pandori, Phagwara =

Pandori
- Village
- Location in Punjab, India Pandori (India)
- Coordinates: 31.522297°N 75.504740°E
- Country: India
- State: Punjab
- District: Kapurthala

Government
  - Type: Panchayati raj (India)
  - Body: Gram panchayat

Population (2011)
  - Total: 369
- Sex ratio 201/168♂/♀

Languages
  - Official: Punjabi
  - Other spoken: Hindi
- Time zone: UTC+5:30 (IST)
- PIN: 144401
- Telephone code: 01822
- ISO 3166 code: IN-PB
- Vehicle registration: PB-09
- Website: kapurthala.gov.in

Pandori is a village in Phagwara Tehsil in Kapurthala district of Punjab State, India. It is located 46 kilometres (29 mi) from Kapurthala, 6 kilometres (3.7 mi) from Phagwara. The village is administrated by a Sarpanch who is an elected representative of village as per the constitution of India and Panchayati raj.

== Transport ==
Kartarpur railway station and Hamira railway station are the very nearby railway stations to Pandori. Jalandhar City Rail Way station is 25 km away from the village. The village is 76 km away from Sri Guru Ram Dass Jee International Airport in Amritsar. Another nearby airport is Sahnewal Airport in Ludhiana which is located 86 km away from the village. Kapurthala, Urmar Tanda, Jalandhar, Kartarpur are the nearby cities to Pandori village.
