= Maryamabad, Hormozgan =

Maryamabad مريم اباد
- Village
- Location within Iran
- Coordinates: 27°47′07″N 57°12′24″E
- Country: Iran
- Province: Hormozgan
- County: Rudan
- Bakhsh: Rudkhaneh
- Rural District: Mosaferabad

Population (2006)
  - Total: 44
- Time zone: UTC+3:30 (IRST)
  - Summer (DST): UTC+4:30 (IRDT)

Maryamabad (Persian: مريم اباد, also Romanized as Maryamābād) is a village in Mosaferabad Rural District, Rudkhaneh District, Rudan County, Hormozgan Province, Iran. At the 2006 census, its population was 44, in 7 families.
