= Alipur Chatha Tehsil =

Pakistani admionistrative area

Alipur Chatha Tehsil تحصیل علی پورچٹھہ
- Tehsil
- Country: Pakistan
- Region: (Punjab, Pakistan) Punjab
- District: Wazirabad
- Capital: Alipur Chatha
- Time zone: UTC+5 (PST)
- Postal code: 52080

Ali Pur Chatha Tehsil (Urdu & Punjabi: تحصیل علی پورچٹھہ), is a Tehsil (subdivision) of District Wazirabad in the Punjab province of Pakistan. Alipur Chatha city is the headquarter of tehsil.

Alipur Chatta railway station is located in Alipur Chatha city.

== See also ==
- Divisions of Pakistan
- Tehsils of Pakistan
  - Tehsils of Punjab, Pakistan
  - Tehsils of Khyber Pakhtunkhwa, Pakistan
  - Tehsils of Balochistan, Pakistan
  - Tehsils of Sindh, Pakistan
  - Tehsils of Azad Kashmir
  - Tehsils of Gilgit-Baltistan
- District
  - Districts of Khyber Pakhtunkhwa, Pakistan
  - Districts of Punjab, Pakistan
  - Districts of Balochistan, Pakistan
  - Districts of Sindh, Pakistan
  - Districts of Azad Kashmir
  - Districts of Gilgit-Baltistan
