= Ghulam Muhammad Chattha =

Punjabi Chattha clan chief (died 1790)

Ghualm Muhammad Chattha
- Chaudry; Sardar

Sardar of Wazirabad and Hafizabad
- Reign: 1780-1790
- Predecessor: Pir Muhammad Chattha
- Successor: Jan Muhammad Chattha
- Died: 1790; Manchar Chattha
- Dynasty: Chattha
- Father: Pir Muhammad Chattha
- Religion: Sunni Islam

Ghulam Muhammad Chattha (Punjabi: غلام محمد چٹھہ) was a Punjabi Muslim chief of the Chattha clan. He succeeded his father Pir Muhammad Chattha. He is regarded as the most able Chattha chief.

== Reign ==
After Pir Muhammad Chattha's death his son Ghulam Muhammad Chattha inherited the Chattha chieftaincy and the hatred of Sukerchakias. The rivalry was passed down to Mahan Singh and Ghulam Muhammad Chattha.

Under his leadership the Chathas gained several successes over the Sikhs, in one of which they captured the famous Bhangi gun, and it at one time looked as if the progress of the Sikh arms had been arrested and their dominion in the Doab annihilated.

But soon Mahan Singh formed matrimonial alliances with Bhangi misl and besieged Manchar for six months. An ill Ghulam Muhammad Chattha offered surrender if he could leave for Mecca in safety. This was initially agreed to, however the Chattha chief was then treacherously shot on Mahan Singh's instigation.
