= Alipur Chattha railway station =

Railway station in Punjab, Pakistan

Alipur Chattha Railway Station علی پور چٹھہ ریلوے اسٹیشن
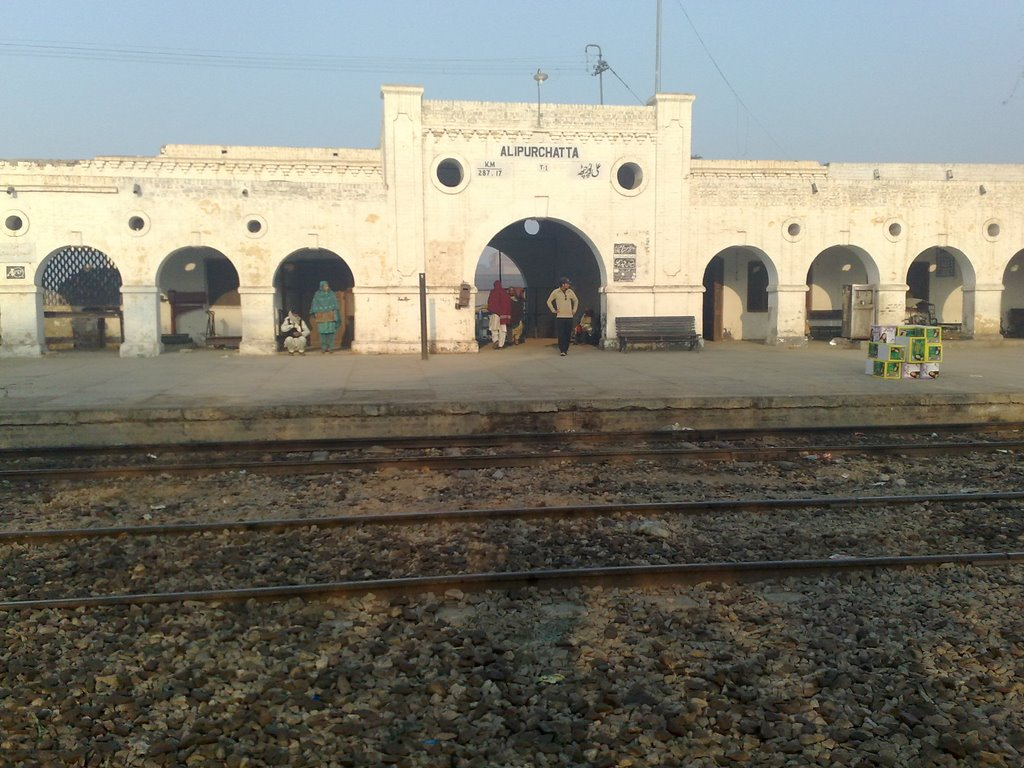

General information
- Coordinates: 32°15′20″N 73°49′00″E
- Owner: Ministry of Railways
- Line: Khanewal–Wazirabad Branch Line

Other information
- Station code: ACHH

Services
Preceding station	Pakistan Railways	Following station
Gajar Gola towards Khanewal Junction	Khanewal–Wazirabad Branch Line	Mancher Chattha towards Wazirabad Junction
Location

Alipur Chattha Railway Station (Urdu: علی پور چٹھہ ریلوے اسٹیشن) is located in Alipur Chattha city, Wazirabad District, Punjab province, Pakistan. The station is on the Khanewal–Wazirabad Branch Line.

== See also ==
- List of railway stations in Pakistan
- Pakistan Railways
