= Vanike Tarar =

Union Council in Hafizabad Town

- Town
- Location within Pakistan
- Coordinates: 32°21′8.426″N 73°58′59.001″E
- Province: Punjab
- District: Hafizabad

Area
  - Total: 25 km^{2} (9.7 sq mi)
- Elevation: 210 m (690 ft)
- Time zone: UTC+5 (PST)
- Calling code: 0547

Vanike Tarar is a town in the Hafizabad District of Punjab, Pakistan.
