= Sohianwala =

- Location within Pakistan
- Coordinates: 30.57°N 70.51°E
- Country: Pakistan
- Province: Punjab
- Elevation: 135 m (443 ft)
- Time zone: UTC+5 (PST)

Sohianwala, also transliterated as Soianwala, Sooianwala and Sooian Wala, is a village in the Punjab of Pakistan. It is located at 30°57'0N 70°51'25E with an altitude of 135 metres (446 feet).
