= Mahay Chattha =

- Village
- Location in Pakistan
- Coordinates: 31.948626°N 74.334556°E
- Country: Pakistan
- Region: Punjab
- District: Gujranwala
- Tehsil: Kamoke
- Time zone: UTC+5 (PST)
  - Summer (DST): UTC+6 (PDT)

Mahay Chattha is a small village 13 kilometres (8.1 mi) from the city of Kamoke Gujranwala.
