= Alipur Chattha =

Town in Punjab, Pakistan

Alipur Chattha علی پور چٹھہ Akalgarh
- City
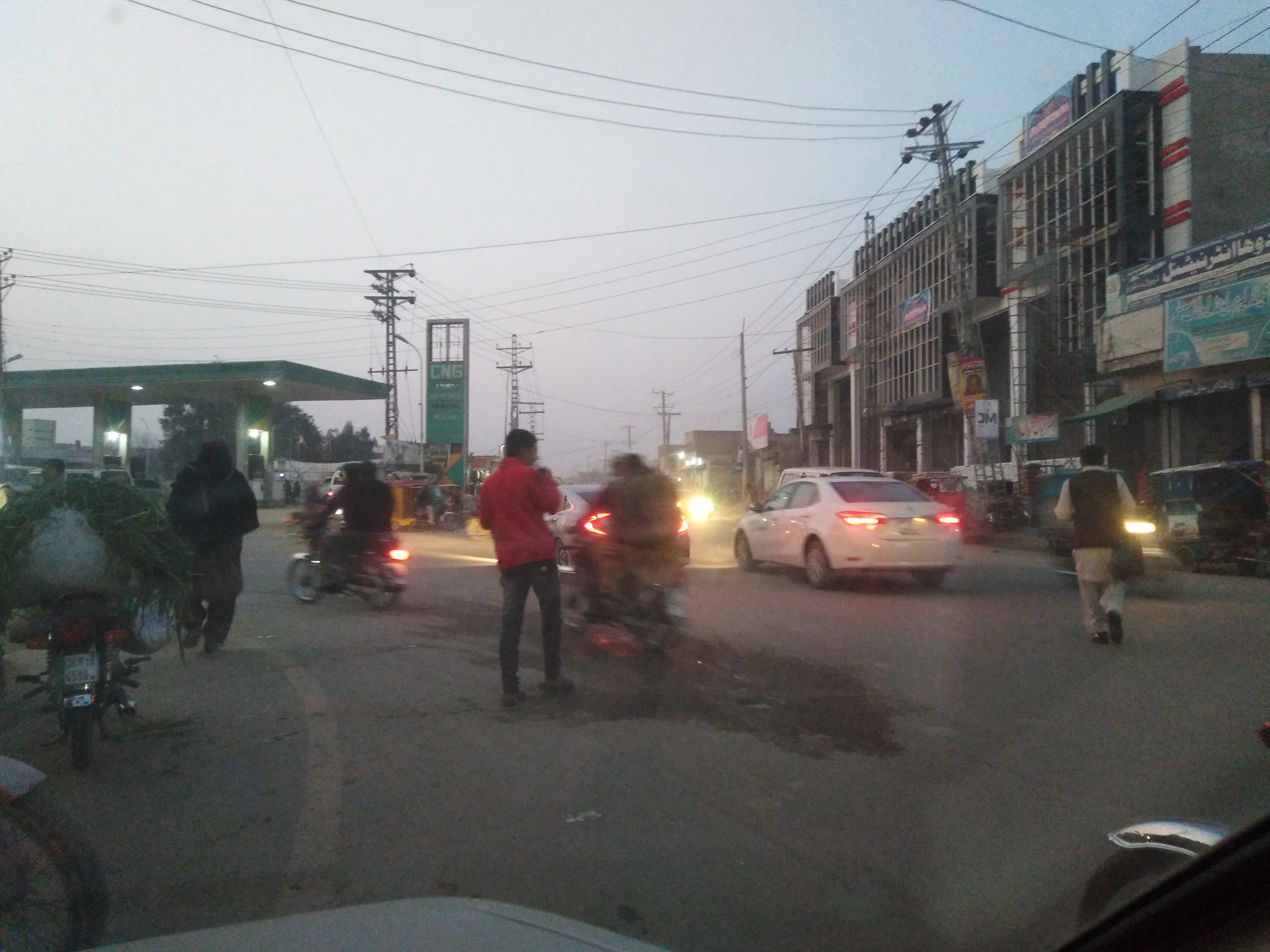
- Alipur Chatha

- Location of Alipur Chattha Alipur Chatta (Pakistan)
- Coordinates: 32.16°N 73.49°E
- Country: Pakistan
- Province: Punjab
- District: Wazirabad
- Tehsil: Alipur Chatha
- Established: 14 October 2022

Area
  - Total: 4.6 sq mi (12 km^{2})

Population
  - Estimate (2023): 76,964
- Time zone: UTC+5 (PST)
  - Summer (DST): +5
- Postal code type: 52080
- Calling code: 055

Alipur Chattha (formerly Akalgarh) is a town of Wazirabad District, Punjab, Pakistan. The municipality was created in 1867 during the colonial rule. It is situated 35 km west of the district headquarters Wazirabad, between 25 and 30 km north of Hafizabad, 8 km south of Rasool Nagar, 26 km east of Vanike Tarar and 15 km from Chenab River (Qadirabad Barrage).

== History ==
The village was, along with neighbouring areas, a stronghold of Chattha clan. It was captured by Maha Singh of Sukerchakia Misl in 1718 who renamed it Akalgarh. The municipality was created in 1867 during colonial rule. At that time, the town lay on the Wazirabad–Lyallpur branch of the North Western State Railway.

Alipur Chattha was founded by Ali Muhammad Chattha, after whom the tehsil was named. According to the family history, he had no biological sons, and his ancestral landholdings were passed down through his daughter, who married into the Cheema Family of Chak Sada. The Cheema family then inherited 21 murabbas of land in Alipur Chattha and is regarded in family tradition as the rightful successor to Sardar Ali Muhammad Chattha's Alipur Chattha estate, preserving his Lineage through his daughter's descendants.

== Demographics ==
Population

Historical population
Year	Pop.	±%
1972	14,090	—
1981	20,905	+48.4%
1998	39,547	+89.2%
2017	60,983	+54.2%
2023	76,964	+26.2%

According to the 2023 Census of Pakistan, the population of Alipur Chatha stood at 76,964, up from 60,983 recorded during the 2017 Census. Between 2017 and 2023, the city experienced an annual population growth rate of 4.0%. The 2023 demographic structure reflects a gender distribution of 38,516 males (50%) and 38,433 females (49.9%).

== Communication ==
Alipur is connected with Wazirabad via Wazirabad-Alipur Highway and with Gujranwala via Kalaskay through Gujranwala-Alipur Highway. Alipur Chatta railway station is located in Alipur Chatha city on the Khanewal–Wazirabad Branch line.

== See also ==
- Jalalpur Chattha
- Ahmad Nagar Chattha
- Jugna Chattha
- Verpal Chattha
- Jamke Chattha
- Ajitke Chattha
- Madrassa Chattha
- Dehla Chattha
- Mahay Chattha
