= Pir Muhammad Chattha =

18th-century Punjabi Muslim chieftain

- Chaudry; Sardar; Zamindar

Sardar of Wazirabad and Hafizabad
- Predecessor: Nur Muhammad Chattha
- Successor: Ghulam Muhammad Chattha
- Died: 1785
- Dynasty: Chattha
- Father: Nur Muhammad Chattha
- Religion: Sunni Islam

Pir Muhammad Chattha (Punjabi: پیر محمد چٹھہ) was a Punjabi Muslim general and chieftain of the Chattha clan of Jats. He succeeded his father Nur Muhammad Chattha.

== Reign ==
He is known to be a bitter enemy of Sukherchakia Misl.‘Chatthian di Var’ existed in oral form which was first recorded by the late Prof. Qazi Fazl-i-Maq and published.

The poem makes no mention of the first Chattha chief, Nur Mohammad. It starts with Pir Mohammad Chattha and Charat Singh. Charat Singh, the rising Sikh leader, had developed some enmity with Pir Mohammad about whom the poet says:

اک پیر محمد نام سی دھن جمدی مائی

تے خوشی قبیلہ اپنا سبھ بھیناں بھائی

رسول نگر دا اچودھری، بھو دشمن پائی

تے اس دی وچ پنجاب دے سبھ پھرے دوهائي

Translation:

"Pir Muhammad was a great man

He was a leader of Rasulnagar

His enemy feared him

His authority echoed throughout all of Punjab"

According to the poet Charat Singh could afford a head-on collision with Pir Mohammad.

Charhat Singh asked Pir Mohammad to pay tribute to him and accept his suzerainty but according to ‘Chatthian di Var’ Pir Muhammad refused to do so:

"Pir Muhammad was asked by Charat Singh to pay tribute but the Singh could not get that until he died".

In 1765 when Lahore was taken by the Sikhs, the Zamzama gun fell to the share of Charat Singh Sukarchakia who carried it to Gujranwala. In the Sardar's absence the gun was captured by Ahmad Khan Chatha, who placed it in his fort of Ahmadnagar. Pir Muhammad quarrelled with his brother for the possession of it and in the fight a son of Pir Muhammad and two sons of Ahmad Khan lost their lives.

Pir Muhammad Chattha built many forts after his name including Kot Mian Khan, Alipur, Naiwala, Kot Salim, Kot Ali Muhammad and Fatehpur.

== See also ==
- Chattha (clan)
- Muslim Jats
- Punjabi Muslims
