= Chattha (clan) =

Punjabi Jat clan

Chattha (also spelled Chatha) is a Punjabi Jat clan.

It was historically concentrated in the Rachna Doab, particularly around the historical Gujranwala District (which includes modern-day Wazirabad and Hafizabad). The Chatthas, taking advantage of the weakening of the Mughal Empire, established their independent rule by taking over much of Wazirabad District and its environs while also ceasing tribute payments to the Mughal subahdar of Lahore. The Chatthas were also able to beat back the expanding Sikh Misls on multiple occasions and had a particular rivalry with the Sukerchakia Misl (memorialized in the vaar, Chatthian di Vaar) who eventually defeated them.

== Notable people ==
- Akmal Saif Chatha, Pakistani politician
- Ashish Chattha, Indian-American soccer player
- Chaudhary Aadil Bakhsh Chattha, Pakistani politician
- Ghulam Muhammad Chattha, Chattha chieftain
- Hamid Nasir Chattha, Pakistani politician
- Khurram Ijaz Chattha, Pakistani politician
- Naeem Hussain Chattha, Pakistani politician
- Nur Muhammad Chattha, Chattha chieftain
- Pir Muhammad Chattha, Chattha chieftain

== See also ==
- Sukerchakia–Chattha conflict
- Cheema (surname)
- List of Punjabi tribes
