= Ahmad Nagar Chattha =

Town in Punjab, Pakistan

Ahmad Nagar Chattha احمد نگر چٹھا Ahmednagar
- Town
- Location of Ahmad Nagar Chattha Ahmad Nagar Chattha (Pakistan)
- Coordinates: 32°18′35″N 73°59′17″E
- Country: Pakistan
- Province: Punjab
- District: Wazirabad
- Tehsil: Wazirabad
- Number of Union Councils: 1

Government
  - Former Speaker of the National Assembly of Pakistan: Hamid Nasir Chattha

Area
  - Total: 1.9 sq mi (5 km^{2})

Population
  - Estimate (2017): 13,493
- Time zone: UTC+5 (PST)
  - Summer (DST): +5
- Postal code type: 52070
- Calling code: 055

Ahmad Nagar Chattha is a town in Wazirabad District in Punjab, Pakistan.

== History ==
=== Chattha State (1750 - 1797) ===
The Chatthas under their leader Nur Muhammad Chattha declared independence from Mughal Empire in 1750 and formed the Chattha State. After Pir Muhammad Chattha's death his son Ghulam Muhammad Chattha inherited the Chattha state and the hatred of Sukerchakias. The rivalry was passed down to Mahan Singh and Ghulam Muhammad Chattha.

Under his leadership the Chathas gained several successes over the Sikhs, and it at one time looked as if the progress of the Sikh army had been arrested and their dominion in the Doab annihilated.

Chattha State was annexed when Jan Muhammad Chattha was killed in a siege led by Ranjit Singh when the latter recovered the lost Chattha state with Afghan aid.

== Demography ==
Ahmad Nager Chatha has a population of over 40,000 and is located about 45 kilometres northwest of Gujranwala city. The population is over 95% Muslim. Most people in the town speak Punjabi, though almost all of them can also speak the national language of Pakistan, Urdu.

== Education ==
The Government Boys Higher Secondary School was established in 1910. Other educational institutions include the Government Girls Higher Secondary School, Government Primary School, and Al-Faisal High School.

== Notable people ==
- Abdul Hafeez Taib (1931-2006), poet.
- Hamid Nasir Chattha, politician, previously serving as Speaker of the National Assembly of Pakistan and as a government minister.

== Communication ==
Ahmad Nager Chattha is accessible by road from Gujranwala and Wazirabad. Ahmad Nagar Chatha is connected with Wazirabad via Wazirabad-Rasul Nagar Highway, though the city is situated a few kilometres away from this highway. Another road connects it with Gujranwala via Kalaskay. This city has a direct link with Gakhar via NoorKot.

Wazirabad-Faisalabad rail link is the only nearby railway line.
