= Madrassa Chattha =

- Village
- Location within Pakistan
- Coordinates: 32.16°N 73.51°E
- Country: Pakistan
- Province: Punjab
- District: Gujranwala
- Time zone: UTC+5 (PST)

Madrassa Chattha is a village located in Gujranwala District, Punjab, Pakistan. It is located about 7 km west of Alipur Chattha. The village is inhabited by the Jatt Chatha tribe and has an estimated population of around 2,000. Most of the residents have lands in the adjoining areas. The main way to get to the village is a small paved road that branches off from the main Alipur-Qadirabad Road near Hazrat Kalianwala. The village has a government primary school and a health dispensary.
