= Wazirabad District =

Wazirabad ضلع وزیر آباد
- District of Punjab
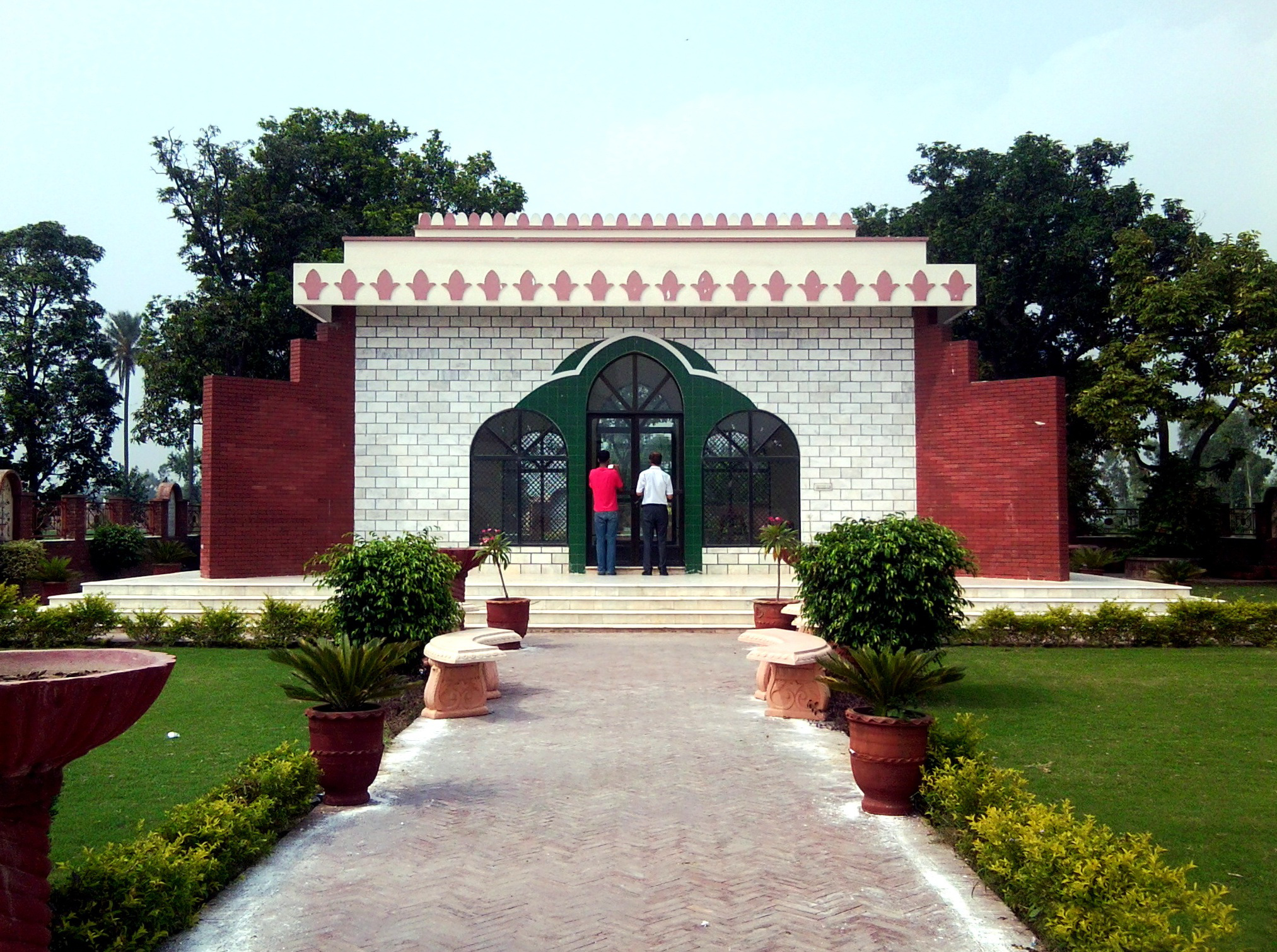
- Tomb of Maulana Zafar Ali Khan

- Country: Pakistan
- Province: (Punjab, Pakistan) Punjab
- Division: Gujrat
- No. of Union Councils: 12
- Municipal status: 1867
- Headquarters: Wazirabad

Government
  - AC: Jawad Hussain PirZada
  - CEO(DEA): Asif Mehmood

Area
  - District: 1,206 km^{2} (466 sq mi)
- Elevation: 215 m (705 ft)

Population (2023)
  - District: 993,412
  - Density: 823.7/km^{2} (2,133/sq mi)
  - Urban: 369,009 (37.15%)
  - Rural: 624,403 (62.85%)
- Demonym: Wazirabadi
- Time zone: UTC+5 (PST)
  - Summer (DST): UTC+6 (PDT)
- Postal code: 52000
- Area code: 0556

Wazirabad District (Note: Punjabi and Urdu: ضِلع وزیر آباد) is a district within the Gujrat Division of Punjab, Pakistan. It is bordered by the districts of Gujrat, Sialkot, Mandi Bahauddin, Hafizabad and Gujranwala.

== Administration ==
Wazirabad is in fact a city-district. The district is divided into the following tehsils:

Tehsil	Area (km²)	Pop. (2023)	Density (ppl/km²) (2023)	Literacy rate (2023)	Union Councils
Wazirabad	1,196	993,412	830.61	77.39%	...
Ali Pur Chatta	...	...	...	...	...

== Demographics ==
Historical population
Year	Pop.	±% p.a.
1951	217,197	—
1961	254,715	+1.61%
1972	370,310	+3.46%
1981	442,493	+2.00%
1998	644,233	+2.23%
2017	830,272	+1.34%
2023	993,412	+3.04%

Religion in Wazirabad district (2023)
Religion	Percent
Islam	96.39%
Christianity	3.52%
Other or not stated	0.09%

As of the 2023 census, Wazirabad district has 142,381 households and a population of 993,412. The district has a sex ratio of 100.19 males to 100 females and a literacy rate of 77.39%: 79.18% for males and 75.62% for females. 271,868 (27.37% of the surveyed population) are under 10 years of age. 369,009 (37.15%) live in urban areas.

Religion in contemporary Wazirabad District
Religious group	1941		2017		2023	
Religious group	Pop.	%	Pop.	%	Pop.	%
Islam	157,961	76.70%	799,960	96.35%	957,556	96.39%
Hinduism (Note: 1931-1941: Including Ad-Dharmis)	22,451	10.90%	32	~0%	117	0.01%
Sikhism	13,543	6.58%	—N/a	—N/a	15	~0%
Christianity	11,829	5.74%	29,395	3.54%	34,919	3.52%
Ahmadi	—N/a	—N/a	865	0.10%	747	0.08%
Others	168	0.08%	20	~0%	58	~0%
Total Population	205,952	100%	830,272	100%	993,412	100%
Note: 1941 census data is for Wazirabad tehsil of erstwhile Gujranwala district, which roughly corresponds to contemporary Wazirabad district. District and tehsil borders have changed since 1941.

Languages of Wazirabad district (2023)
1. Punjabi (94.1%)
2. Urdu (4.72%)
3. Others (1.22%)

At the 2023 census, 94.06% of the population identified Punjabi and 4.72% Urdu as their first language.

== See also ==
- Divisions of Pakistan
- Tehsils of Pakistan
  - Tehsils of Punjab, Pakistan
  - Tehsils of Khyber Pakhtunkhwa, Pakistan
  - Tehsils of Balochistan, Pakistan
  - Tehsils of Sindh, Pakistan
  - Tehsils of Azad Kashmir
  - Tehsils of Gilgit-Baltistan
- District
  - Districts of Khyber Pakhtunkhwa, Pakistan
  - Districts of Punjab, Pakistan
  - Districts of Balochistan, Pakistan
  - Districts of Sindh, Pakistan
  - Districts of Azad Kashmir
  - Districts of Gilgit-Baltistan
