= Kalaske Cheema =

Town in Punjab, Pakistan

Kalaske کلاسکے
- Town
- Location within Pakistan
- Coordinates: 32.242°N 74.019°E
- Country: Pakistan
- Province: Punjab

Population (2017 Census of Pakistan)
  - Total: 15,599
- Time zone: UTC+5 (PST)

Kalaske (Urdu: کلاسکے) or Kalaske Cheema is a small town in Wazirabad Tehsil in Punjab, Pakistan. It is on situated on Ali Pur Chattha Road about 15 kilometres (9.3 mi) west of the Gujranwala city and about 90 kilometres (56 mi) northwest of the provincial capital Lahore.

It has a population of 15,599 per the 2017 Census of Pakistan.
