= Rasool Nagar =

Rasool Nagar رسول نگر Ramnagar
- Town
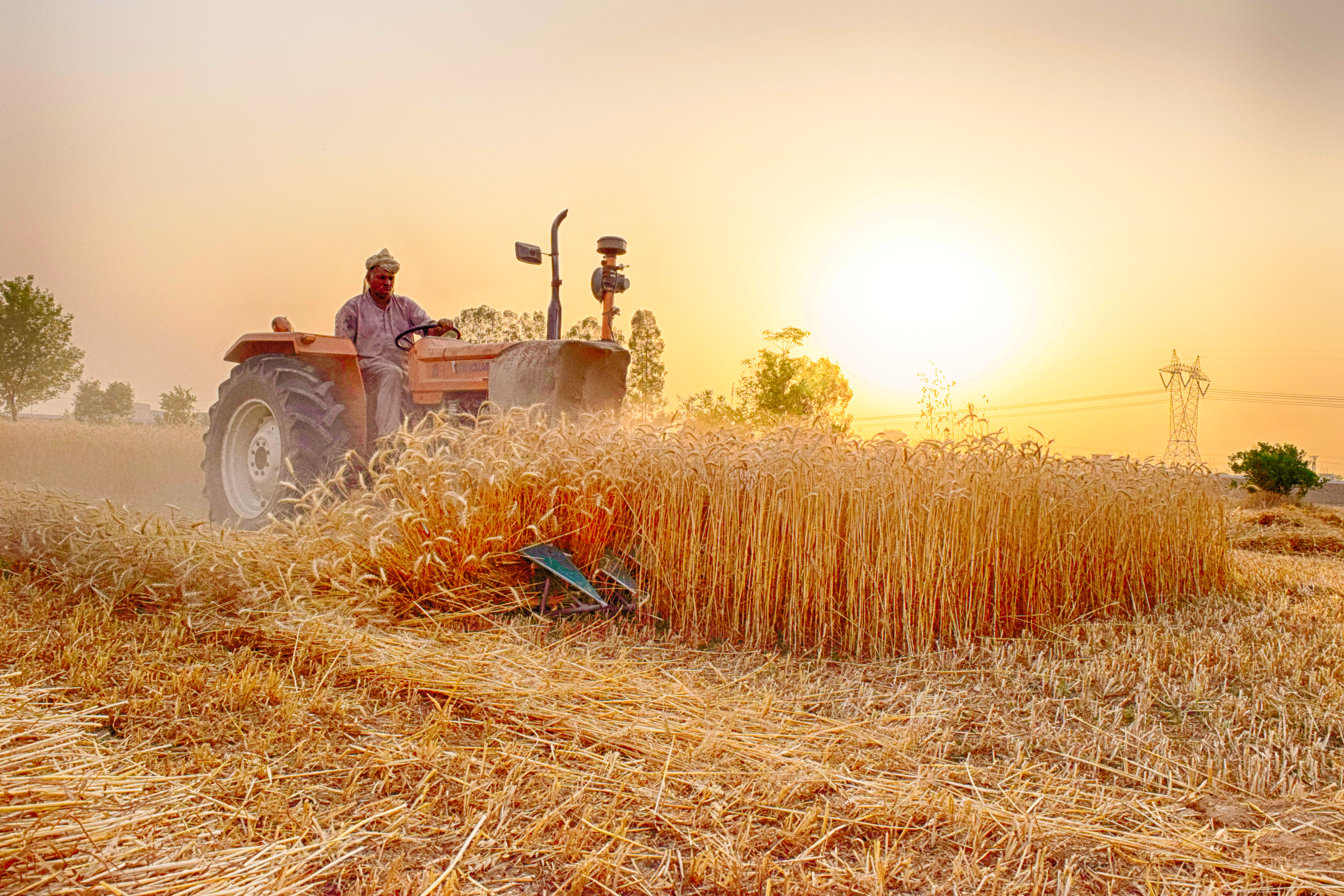

- Location within Pakistan Location within Punjab, Pakistan
- Coordinates: 32.18°N 74.9°E
- Country: Pakistan
- Province: Punjab
- Division: Gujranwala
- District: Wazirabad
- Tehsil: Alipur Chatha
- Time zone: UTC+5 (PST)

Rasool Nagar or Rasul Nagar (Punjabi and Urdu: رسول نگر), erstwhile Ramnagar or Ram Nagar, is a small town in Wazirabad District, in Punjab province of Pakistan. It is situated on the bank of the Chenab River, 8 km from Alipur Chatha and 40 km from Wazirabad. It has its own municipality, which is governed by a chairman. It is located at 32°20'0N 73°47'0E with an altitude of 197 metres (649 feet) and is part of Wazirabad Tehsil.

Rasul Nagar is situated on Wazirabad-Pindi Bhattian highway which is being upgraded to Express Way (E-3). A road link connects it with Alipur Chatha, the nearest town.
