= Hassan Wali =

Place in Punjab, Pakistan

Hassan Wali or Dhupai
- Village
- Dhupai Hassan Wali
- Location within Pakistan
- Coordinates: 32°19′32″N 73°53′48″E
- Country: Pakistan
- Province: Punjab
- District: Gujranwala

Government
  - Numbardar or Lambardar: Hassan Muhammad Toor
  - Numbardar & Family: Hassan Muhammad Toor Sardar Muhammad Toor Chaudhary Yousaf Toor (Childless, No Child) Chaudhary Younas Toor Chaudhary Abdul Rehman Toor Chaudhary Abdullah Toor (Advocate) Chaudhary Ubaidullah Toor Chaudhary Suleiman Toor Chaudhary Dawood Ali Toor Chaudhary Musa Ali Toor

Area
  - Total: 3.67 km^{2} (1.42 sq mi)

Population
  - Estimate (2017): 2,714
- Time zone: UTC+5 (PST)
- Calling code: 055

Hassan Wali also known as Dhupai (Punjabi: حسن والی, romanized: hassān-wálī or dhūpâi), officially the Dhupai Hassan Wali (Punjabi: ڈُھْپَئِ حَسَنْ وَاْلِیْ, romanized: dhūpâi hassān wálī). Hassan Wali or Dhupai s a small village located in Wazirabad Tehsil, Gujranwala District, Punjab, Pakistan.

== Demography ==
Hassan Wali has a population of over 2,700 and is located about 40 kilometres northwest of Gujranwala city. Most people in the village speak Punjabi, though almost can also speak the national language of Pakistan, Urdu. English is spoken by the educated elite in Hassan Wali. The majority of the native people are from the royal blood of Tomara dynasty, landlord Toor Jatt caste and are rooted here for around 500 years.

== Education ==
For education in the village, Government Schools are functional by the Government of Punjab under the Board of Intermediate and Secondary Education, Gujranwala.

- Government Girls Primary School (GGPS), Hassan Wali
- Government Boys Primary School (GPS), Hassan Wali

== Communication ==
The only way to get Hassan Wali is by road. A car journey from Kalaske Cheema takes about 5 minutes. Wazirabad-Faisalabad rail link is the only nearby railway line.

== See also ==
- Iftikhar Nagar Cheema
- Kale Wala
- Gill Wala
