= Jugna Chattha =

Pakistani village

- Village
- Location within Pakistan
- Coordinates: 32°17′52″N 73°56′37″E
- Country: Pakistan
- Province: Punjab
- District: Gujranwala

Area
  - Total: 1.12 km^{2} (0.43 sq mi)

Population
  - Estimate (2017): 600
- Time zone: UTC+5 (PST)
- Calling code: 055

Jugna Chattha, also spelled as Jagna Chattha, is a village in Gujranwala District, Tehsil Wazirabad, Punjab, Pakistan. It is located to the west of Ghari Donger village and Ahmad Nagar Chattha town.

For education in the village, there is the Government Girls Primary School in Jugna Chattha, under the Board of Intermediate and Secondary Education, Gujranwala of the Government of Punjab, Pakistan. No school for boys is available in the village. Boys for primary and higher-level education, while girls for higher education go to Dilawar Cheema Khurd and Ahmad Nagar Chattha. Most of the population of the village is educated. Farming is the livelihood of the people in the village, with a few people working as government employees. For basic essentials, People visit Ahmad Nagar Chattha like food, education, health, clothes, shoes and electricity. The only way to get to Jugna Chattha is by road. Jugna Chattha is directly connected with Dilawar Cheema Khurd, Ghari Donger, Jham Wala and Peera Thatha, When connected with Ahmad Nagar Chattha via Ghari Donger. 100% population in Jugna Chattha is Muslim.

== See also ==
- Pathanke Cheema
- Kub Pora Cheema
- Ghari Donger
