= Kale Wala =

Village in Punjab, Pakistan

Kale Wala shareef
- Village
- Location within Pakistan
- Coordinates: 32°18′12″N 74°02′41″E
- Country: Pakistan
- Province: Punjab
- District: Gujranwala

Area
  - Total: 2.5 km^{2} (0.97 sq mi)

Population
  - Estimate (2017): 4,354
- Time zone: UTC+5 (PST)
- Calling code: 055

Kale Wala Shareef is a small village in Tehsil Alipur, District Wazirabad, Punjab, Pakistan. The village is located west of Gill Wala and east of Chabba Cheema. For education in the village a Government Girls Primary School (GGPS), Kale Wala and Government Primary School For Boys is functional, by Government of Punjab under Board of Intermediate and Secondary Education, Gujranwala.

It is 12km from Gakhar Mandi on Ahmad Nagar Road.

== See also ==
- Gurali (Pakistan)
- Iftikhar Nagar Cheema
