= Hardo Saharan =

Town in the Punjab province, Pakistan

Hardo Saharan ہردو سہارن Saharan Chatha
- Town
- Location of Hardo Saharan Hardo Saharan (Pakistan)
- Coordinates: 32°13′35″N 73°53′30″E
- Province: Punjab
- District: Gujranwala
- Tehsil: Wazirabad
- Number of Union Councils: 1

Population
  - Estimate (2017): 9,040
- Time zone: UTC+05:00 (Pakistan Standard Time)
- Calling code: 055

Hardo Saharan (Urdu: ہردو سہارن), also known as Saharan Chattha, is a town and union council in Wazirabad Tehsil, Gujranwala District, Punjab, Pakistan. National Assembly constituency of Hardo Saharan is NA79 (Wazirabad) and Punjab Assembly PP52 (Alipur Chatha). The union council number of Hardo Saharan is 17.

== See also ==
- Gujranwala
- Wazirabad
