= Bara Pind, Wazirabad =

Village in Punjab, Pakistan

Bara Pind
- Village
- Location within Pakistan
- Coordinates: 32°19′46″N 73°55′08″E
- Country: Pakistan
- Province: Punjab
- District: Wazirabad

Area
  - Total: 1 km^{2} (0.39 sq mi)

Population
  - Estimate (2017): 1,144
- Time zone: UTC+5 (PST)
- Calling code: 055

Bara Pind is a small village located in Wazirabad District in Punjab, Pakistan.

== Demography ==
Bara Pind has a population of over 1,100.

== Education ==
For education in the village, government schools are functional by Government of Punjab under Board of Intermediate and Secondary Education, Gujranwala. While for matric level education students move to Dilawar Cheema, for inter or college level education student move Ahmad Nagar Chattha and for higher university level education people move to Gujrat.

- Government Girls Primary School (GGPS), Bara Pind
- Government Boys Primary School (GPS), Bara Pind

== Communication ==
The only way to get Bara Pind is by road. Besides driving your own car (which takes about 10 minutes from Dilawar Cheema). The nearest town for basic needs is Ali Pur Chatta.

== See also ==
- Kale Wala
- Gill Wala
- Hassan Wali
