= Mardeke =

Town and Union Council in Wazirabad Tehsil

Mardeke مرڈیکے Manzoorabad (Mardeke)
- Town
- Location of Mardeke Mardeke (Pakistan)
- Coordinates: 32.3797347°N 74.0881813°E
- Country: Pakistan
- Province: Punjab
- District: Gujranwala
- Tehsil: Wazirabad
- Number of Union Councils: 1

Area
  - Total: 1.34 sq mi (3.48 km^{2})

Population
  - Estimate (2017): 6,148
- Time zone: UTC+05:00 (Pakistan Standard Time)
- postal code type: 52111
- Calling code: 055

Mardeke (Urdu: مرڈیکے) also known as Manzoorabad (Mardeke), is a town and Union Council in Wazirabad Tehsil, Gujranwala District, Punjab, Pakistan.

== See also ==
- Gujranwala
- Wazirabad
