= Wanjo Wali =

Town and union council in Punjab, Pakistan

Wanjo Wali وانجو ولی
- Town
- Country: Pakistan
- Province: Punjab
- District: Gujranwala
- Tehsil: Wazirabad
- Number of Union Councils: 1

Area
  - Total: 2.7 sq mi (7 km^{2})

Population
  - Estimate (2017): 9,909
- Time zone: UTC+05:00 (Pakistan Standard Time)
- Calling code: 055

Wanjo Wali (Urdu: وانجو ولی) is a town and union council in Wazirabad Tehsil of Gujranwala District, Punjab, Pakistan.

Government Girls Elementary School Wanjo Wali has operated in the village since 1964. It offers classes up to middle level.

== See also ==
- Gujranwala
- Wazirabad
