= Pundori Kalan =

- Village
- Location within Pakistan
- Coordinates: 32.16°N 73.51°E
- Country: Pakistan
- Province: Punjab
- District: Gujranwala
- Time zone: UTC+5 (PST)

Pundori Kalan is a village in Wazirabad Tehsil, Gujranwala, Punjab, Pakistan.
