= Bhatti Ke =

Town and union council in Punjab, Pakistan

Bhatti Ke بھٹی کے
- Town
- Location of Bhatti Ke Bhatti Ke (Pakistan)
- Coordinates: 32.4385908°N 74.0992551°E
- Country: Pakistan
- Province: Punjab
- District: Gujranwala
- Tehsil: Wazirabad
- Number of Union Councils: 1

Area
  - Total: 0.98 sq mi (2.54 km^{2})

Population
  - Estimate (2017): 3,187
- Time zone: UTC+05:00 (Pakistan Standard Time)
- postal code type: 52001
- Calling code: 055

Bhatti Ke (Urdu: بھٹی کے) is a town and union council in Wazirabad Tehsil, Gujranwala District, Punjab, Pakistan.

== See also ==
- Gujranwala
- Wazirabad
- Badoki Saikhwan
- Qila Didar Singh
