= Ghummanwala =

- Village
- Location within Pakistan
- Coordinates: 31.9925446°N 74.1194898°E
- Country: Pakistan
- Province: Punjab
- District: Gujranwala
- Time zone: UTC+5 (PST)

Ghummanwala is a village in Gujranwala District in the Punjab province of Pakistan. Nearby cities are Gujranwala and Lahore. By road, it is connected to Hafizabad, Shekhupura, Sialkot and Wazirabad.
