= Hazrat Kalianwala =

Town and Union Council in Wazirabad Tehsil

Hazrat Kalianwala حضرت کیلیانوالہ Hazrat Kailianwala
- Town
- Location of Hardo Warpal Hazrat Kalianwala (Pakistan)
- Coordinates: 32.2829542°N 73.7501836°E
- Country: Pakistan
- Province: Punjab
- District: Gujranwala
- Tehsil: Wazirabad
- Number of Union Councils: 1

Area
  - Total: 1.19 sq mi (3.08 km^{2})

Population
  - Estimate (2017): 8,595
- Time zone: UTC+05:00 (Pakistan Standard Time)
- postal code type: 52081
- Calling code: 055

Hazrat Kalianwala (Urdu: حضرت کیلیانوالہ), also spelled as Hazrat Kailianwala, is a town and union council in Wazirabad Tehsil, Gujranwala District, Punjab, Pakistan. About 30 km northwest of the village lies Head Qadirabad Barrage.

== See also ==
- Gujranwala
- Wazirabad
