= Jhatan Wali =

Town and Union Council in Wazirabad Tehsil

Jhatan Wali جھٹاں والی
- Town
- Location of Jhatan Wali Jhatan Wali (Pakistan)
- Coordinates: 32°15′0″N 73°54′0″E
- Country: Pakistan
- Province: Punjab
- District: Gujranwala
- Tehsil: Wazirabad
- Number of Union Councils: 1

Population
  - Estimate (2017): 3,098
- Time zone: UTC+05:00 (Pakistan Standard Time)
- Calling code: 055

Jhatan Wali (Urdu: جھٹاں والی), also spelled Jattan Wali, is a town and Union Council in Wazirabad Tehsil, Gujranwala District, Punjab, Pakistan. The population was 3,098, according to the 2017 census.

== See also ==
- Gujranwala
- Wazirabad
