= Ladhewala Cheema =

Town and Union Council in Wazirabad Tehsil

Ladhewala Cheema لدھیوالا چیما
- Town
- Location of Ladhewala Cheema Ladhewala Cheema (Pakistan)
- Coordinates: 32.2752591°N 74.0091311°E
- Country: Pakistan
- Province: Punjab
- District: Wazirabad
- Tehsil: Wazirabad
- Number of Union Councils: 1

Area
  - Total: 1.19 sq mi (3.09 km^{2})

Population
  - Estimate (2017): 7,992
- Time zone: UTC+05:00 (Pakistan Standard Time)
- postal code type: 52071
- Calling code: 055

Ladhewala Cheema (Punjabi and Urdu: لدھیوالا چیما), also known simply as Ladhewala, is a town and union council in Gujranwala District, Punjab, Pakistan. Ladhewala Cheema is part of in Wazirabad Tehsil.

== See also ==
- Gujranwala
- Wazirabad
