= Dilawar Cheema =

- Village
- Location within Pakistan
- Coordinates: 32°20′10″N 73°56′33″E
- Country: Pakistan
- Province: Punjab
- District: Gujranwala

Area
  - Total: 2.41 km^{2} (0.93 sq mi)

Population
  - Estimate (2017): 7,373
- Time zone: UTC+5 (PST)
- Calling code: 055

Dilawar Cheema (Punjabi, Urdu: دلاور چیمہ) is a village in Tehsil Wazirabad, Gujranwala District, Punjab, Pakistan. It is located in a central area between Ali Pur Chatha, Wazirabad and Gujranwala. Dilawar Cheema is directly connected by road to Dilawar Cheema Khurd, Dera Chungran, Bara Pind, Kub Pora Cheema and Dharowal Kang, while connected with Ahmad Nagar Chattha via Kub Pora Cheema and Pathanke Cheema. A branch of Habib Bank Limited and Civil Veterinary Hospital operate in the village.

Majority of the village population is Muslim.

== Education ==
Government Elementary School Dilawar Cheema, Government Girls and Boys Primary School and Government Girls and Boys High School (GGHS), Dilawar Cheema are functional in the town by Government of Punjab, Pakistan under Board of Intermediate and Secondary Education, Gujranwala. Punjab Governor Rafique Rajwana has formally approved Government Degree College for Women, Dilawar Cheema under the Annual Development Project, which is functional from 2019.

== See also ==
- Pathanke Cheema
- Jugna Chattha
- Ghari Donger
