= Kot Inayat Khan =

Town and Union Council in Wazirabad Tehsil

Kot Inayat Khan کوٹ عنایت خان
- Town
- Location of Kot Inayat Khan Kot Inayat Khan (Pakistan)
- Coordinates: 32.3440935°N 74.1602222°E
- Country: Pakistan
- Province: Punjab
- District: Gujranwala
- Tehsil: Wazirabad
- Number of Union Councils: 1

Area
  - Total: 1.10 sq mi (2.86 km^{2})

Population
  - Estimate (2017): 5,601
- Time zone: UTC+05:00 (Pakistan Standard Time)
- postal code type: 52201
- Calling code: 055

Kot Inayat Khan (Urdu: کوٹ عنایت خان) is a town and union council in Wazirabad Tehsil, Gujranwala District, Punjab, Pakistan.

== See also ==
- Gujranwala
- Nawab Kumhar, singer/songwriter
- Wazirabad
