= Bhoma Bath =

Town and union council in Punjab, Pakistan

Bhoma Bath بھوما باتھ Bhuman Bath
- Town
- Location of Bhoma Bath Bhoma Bath (Pakistan)
- Coordinates: 32.2116258°N 73.9941368°E
- Country: Pakistan
- Province: Punjab
- District: Gujranwala
- Tehsil: Wazirabad
- Number of Union Councils: 1

Area
  - Total: 1.32 sq mi (3.43 km^{2})

Population
  - Estimate (2017): 5,544
- Time zone: UTC+05:00 (Pakistan Standard Time)
- Calling code: 055

Bhoma Bath (Urdu: بھوما باتھ), also spelled Bhuman Bath, is a town and union council in Wazirabad Tehsil, Gujranwala District, Punjab, Pakistan.

== See also ==
- Gujranwala
- Wazirabad
