= Hardo Warpal =

Town and union council in Punjab, Pakistan

Hardo Warpal ہارڈو وارپل Hardo Verpal
- Town
- Location of Hardo Warpal Hardo Warpal (Pakistan)
- Coordinates: 32°15′0″N 73°54′0″E
- Country: Pakistan
- Province: Punjab
- District: Gujranwala
- Tehsil: Wazirabad
- Number of Union Councils: 1

Population
  - Estimate (2017): 13,000
- Time zone: UTC+05:00 (Pakistan Standard Time)
- Calling code: 055

Hardo Warpal Chattha (Urdu: ہرڈو وارپل) also spell as Hardo Verpal Chattha, is a town and Union Council in Wazirabad Tehsil, Gujranwala District, Punjab, Pakistan.

== See also ==
- Gujranwala
- Wazirabad
