= Kaka Kolo =

Town and union council in Punjab, Pakistan

Kaka Kolo ککہ کولو
- Town
- Location of Kaka Kolo Kaka Kolo (Pakistan)
- Coordinates: 32.3369364°N 74.0071949°E
- Country: Pakistan
- Province: Punjab
- District: Gujranwala
- Tehsil: Wazirabad
- Number of Union Councils: 1

Area
  - Total: 1.17 sq mi (3.03 km^{2})

Population
  - Estimate (2017): 6,265
- Time zone: UTC+05:00 (Pakistan Standard Time)
- Calling code: 055

Kaka Kolo (Urdu: ککہ کولو) is a town and union council in Tehsil Ali Pur Chatta, Wazirabad District, Gujranwala division, Punjab, Pakistan.

It is located 21 km from Wazirabad on Rasool Nagar road and 27 km from Ali Pur Chatta and neighbors villages including Saroki Cheema, Ahmad Nagar Chattha & Chabba Cheema.

== Notable people ==
Sain sardar ali sardar bajwa was a Punjabi poet from Kaka Kolo, and his tomb is located in Kaka Kolo. Abdul Hafiz sabir Butt is a famous Homeopathic Doctor and poet from Kaka Kolo.

== See also ==
- Gujranwala
- Wazirabad
