= Nawab Kumhar =

Pakistani Punjabi folk singer

Nawab Kumhar Inayat Kotia (Punjabi: نواب کمھار عنایت کوٹیا) was a Punjabi singer, songwriter and composer from Kot Inayat Khan village of Wazirabad Tehsil, Gujranwala District, Punjab, Pakistan. He wrote, composed and sang many famous Punjabi songs based on the folklore and heroic characters of Punjab. Nawab Kumhar's folk singing style left a strong impact on later folk singers who adopted his style of singing particularly his Jugni singing style which was later adopted by next generation singers like Alam Lohar and made more famous among the next generations through Radio and TV singing platforms.

== Early life ==
Kumhar was taught the art of ballad singing by Allah Ditta Warriach from a neighbouring village. He became known at the age of 35 on Radio Pakistan Lahore in 1933. His major contributions to Punjabi culture are Jugni, Sohni Mahiwal, Mirza Sahiban, Dhol Sammi, Sassui Punnhun, Dulla Bhatti, Puran Bhagat, Jaimal Fattah etc. His sons Sarja and Mirza used to sing while his son Buta played jorri (Alghoza). The prominent jorri player with them was Janna.

== Legacy ==
Kumhar's legacy lived on via his grandson (Sarjas son used to play the tumba and sing) but love for singing was carried on by his student and son-in-law Janna (not the jorri artist). Later Janna's sons carried on folk singing ballads and mahiyas. They are known as Rafiq Kumhar, Latif Kumhar and Haneef Kumhar Teddy. Haneef become famous by singing Chaudhary Mairaj din Dogar's songs such as "Ghund chuk chuk vaikhan nawee viyahi da".

== Works ==
- Puran Bhagat (1933) Vol. 1 and 2 {Re-produced in Wasta Hai Rabb Da in 2000}
- Jung Jaimal Fattah (1960)
- Sohni da Husan (1961)
- Dhol Shehzada Sammi (1974)
- Veer Jodh
- Mirza Sahiban
- Heer
- Jugni
- Jattan nay laani Munji
