= Ghari Donger =

Village in Gujranwala, Punjab, Pakistan

- Village
- Location within Pakistan
- Coordinates: 32°18′33″N 73°57′58″E
- Country: Pakistan
- Province: Punjab
- District: Gujranwala

Area
  - Total: 0.745 km^{2} (0.288 sq mi)

Population
  - Estimate (2017): 627
- Time zone: UTC+5 (PST)
- Calling code: 055

Ghari Donger is a small village in Tehsil Wazirabad of Gujranwala District, Punjab, Pakistan. It is located to the west of Ahmad Nagar Chattha. A government girls primary school is operated in the village by the Government of Punjab under the Board of Intermediate and Secondary Education, Gujranwala.

== See also ==
- Pathanke Cheema
- Kub Pora Cheema
- Mohlunke
