= Mitter =

Mitter is a surname. Notable people with the surname include:

- Adam Mitter (born 1993), English footballer
- Gerhard Mitter (1935–1969), German racing driver
- Gobindram Mitter (fl. 18th century), one of the earliest Indian officials under the British rule
- Rana Mitter (born 1969), historian of modern China at Oxford University
- Sanjoy K. Mitter (1933–2023), engineering professor and control theorist
- Siddheshwar Mitter (1865–1912), civilian employed in the Indian Foreign Department

== Fictional ==
- Pradosh C. Mitter aka Feluda - a fictional famous Bengali private investigator, created by Satyajit Ray

== See also ==
- Ghakka Mitter, a village situated two kilometers east of Wazirabad city, Pakistan
