= Mansoor Wali =

Town and Union Council in Wazirabad Tehsil

Mansoor Wali منصور والی
- Town
- Location of Mansoor Wali Mansoor Wali (Pakistan)
- Coordinates: 32.3764663°N 74.0019697°E
- Country: Pakistan
- Province: Punjab
- District: Gujranwala
- Tehsil: Wazirabad
- Number of Union Councils: 1

Area
  - Total: 0.97 sq mi (2.50 km^{2})

Population
  - Estimate (2017): 4,538
- Time zone: UTC+05:00 (Pakistan Standard Time)
- Calling code: 055

Mansoor Wali (Urdu: منصور والی), also spelled Mansur Wali, is a town and union council in Wazirabad Tehsil, Gujranwala District, of the Punjab province in Pakistan.

== See also ==
- Gujranwala
- Wazirabad
