= Jaura =

Joura may refer to:

== Places ==
- Jaura, Gujrat, Pakistan
- Jaura Kalan, Khushab district, Punjab, Pakistan
- Jaura Sian, Punjab, Pakistan
- Jaura Singha, Gurdaspur district, Punjab, India
- Jaura, Madhya Pradesh, India

== Other uses ==
- Saleem Sarwar Jaura, Pakistani politician
