= Jaura Sian =

- village
- Location within Pakistan
- Coordinates: 32°21′23.494″N 74°12′46.067″E
- Country: Pakistan
- Province: Punjab
- District: Gujranwala

Population
  - Total: 4,000 (approximately)
- Time zone: UTC+5 (PST)
- Calling code: 055

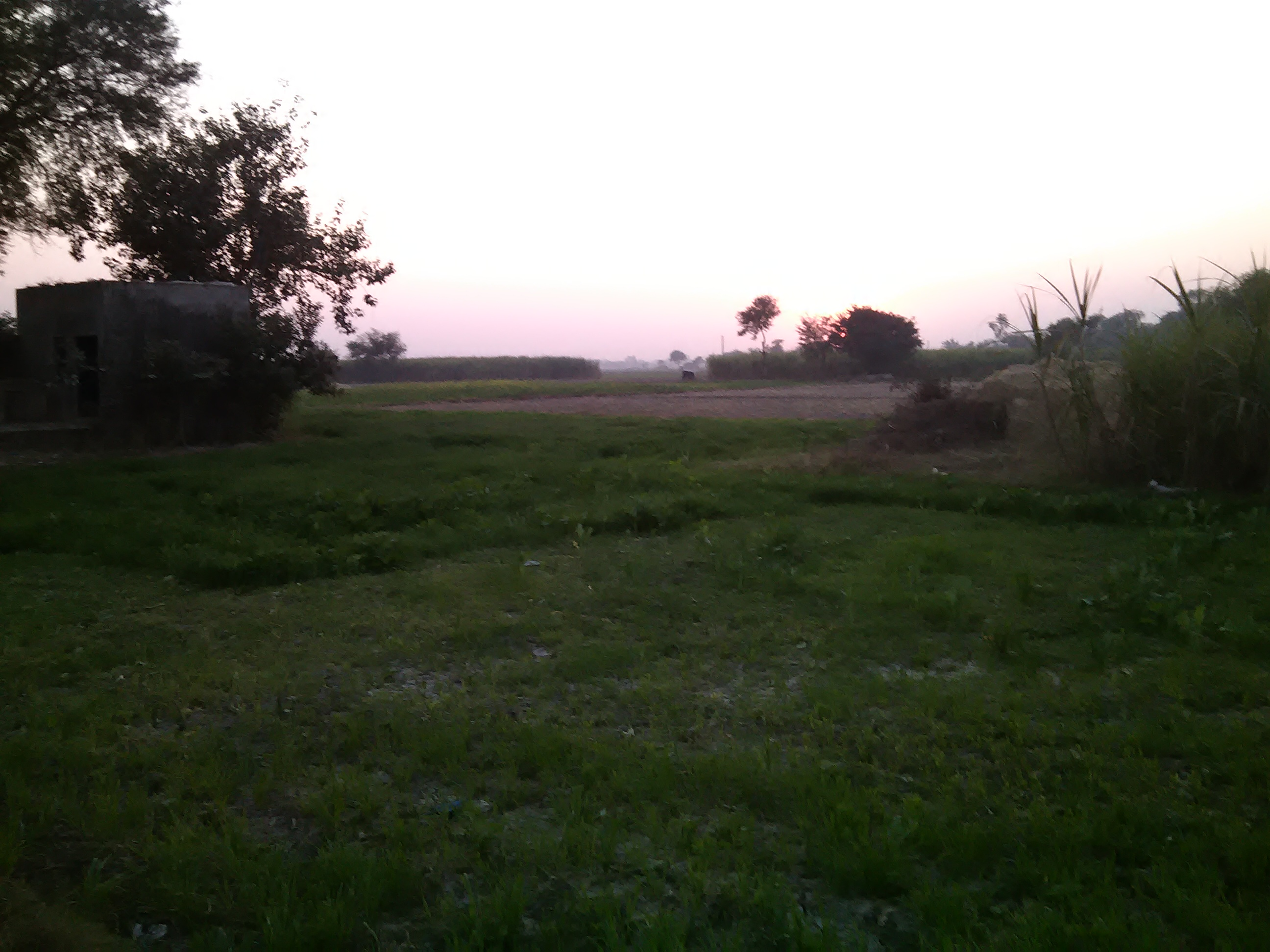
View of Jaura Sian

Jaura Sian is a village in Gujranwala District in Punjab, Pakistan.

== History ==
The village's old name was Jaura Mandi, but due to the dominance of the Sian caste in the area it has become known as Jaura Sian. Sians are descendants of Raja Sian Singh, who converted to Islam at the partition of the subcontinent, and stayed in the village for the rest of his life.

== Population ==
The village population is about 5,000–7,000 according to the census of 1998.

== Language ==
The dominant language is Punjabi with the accent Majih.

== Culture ==
The village is its own union council. This village has a government secondary school for boys and girls, unlike many other villages in the locality. However, for boys and girls to get higher education they have to travel to Gujranwala or Wazirabad. There is no sui gas for the rural people of Jaura Sian.

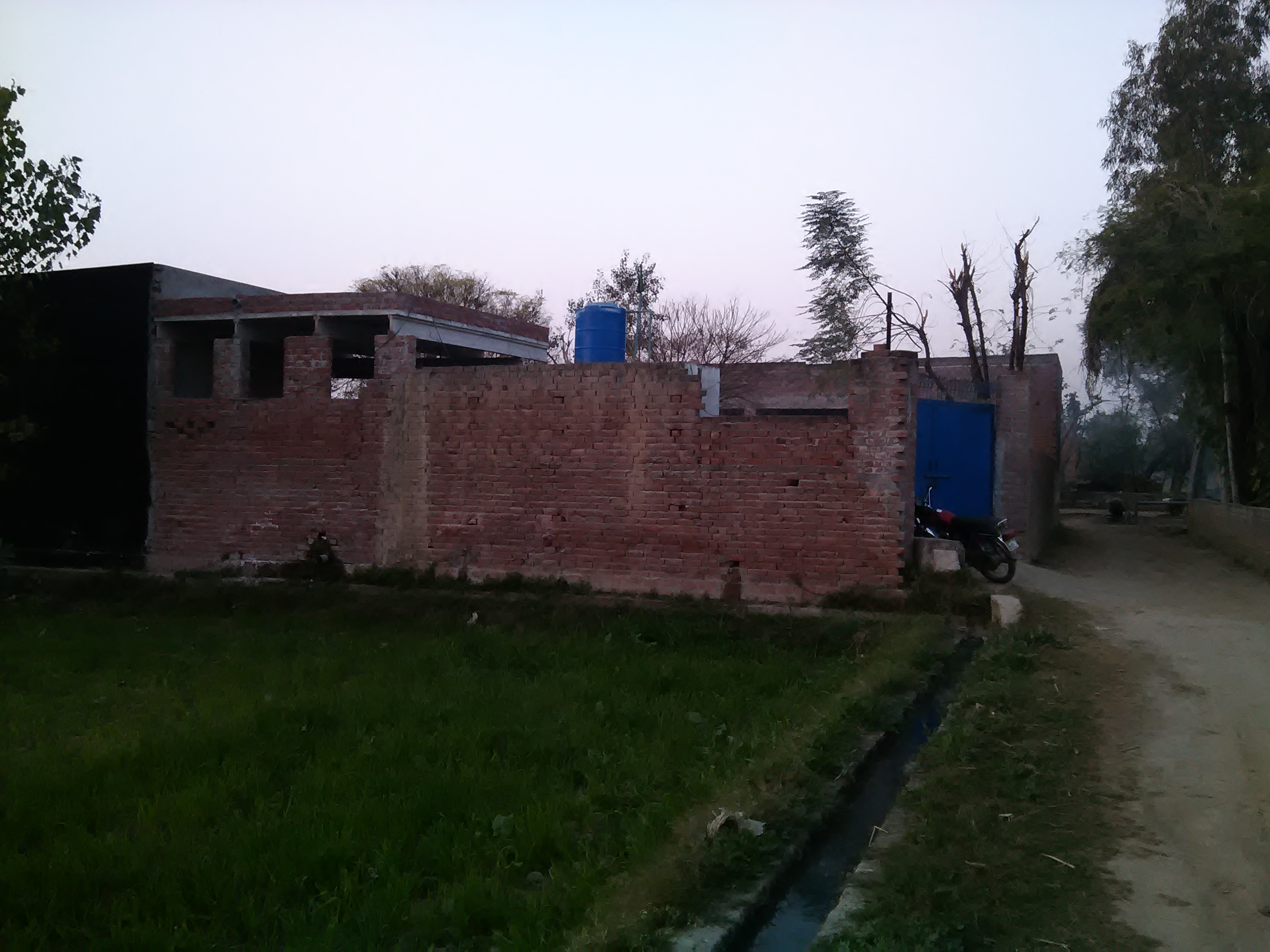
Another view of Jaura Sian
