= Ghakka Mitter =

Ghakka Mitter گھکامیتر
- Town
- Location in Pakistan
- Coordinates: 32.439483°N 74.148024°E
- Village: Pakistan
- Region: Punjab
- District: Gujranwala
- City: Wazirabad
- Number of Union Councils: 1
- Founder: Ghakka & Mitter two persons, GHAKKA (SIKH), MITTER (ARAIAN)

Government
  - Chairman: Mian Muhammad Iqbal

Population (2017)
  - Total: 5,980
- Postal code: 52001
- Area code: 055

Ghakka Mitter (Urdu: گھکامیتر) is a town and union council in Wazirabad Tehsil, Gujranwala District, Punjab, Pakistan. Located about 2.5 km from Wazirabad, the municipal authority for the town is Tehsil Municipal Administration Wazirabad. Ghakka Mitter has 8 mosques, 3 government schools, 3 private English-medium schools and approximately 13,000 residents.

== See also ==
- Gujranwala
- Wazirabad
