= Sodhra =

Town in Punjab, Pakistan

Sodhra سوہدرہ
- Town
- Location within Pakistan
- Coordinates: 32°27′42″N 74°10′56″E
- Country: Pakistan
- Province: Punjab
- District: Wazirabad
- Tehsil: Wazirabad

Government
- Elevation: 222 m (728 ft)
- Time zone: UTC+5 (PST)

Sodhra is a town and union council of Wazirabad District in the Punjab province of Pakistan. It is part of Wazirabad Tehsil. The town lies on the left bank of the Chenab five miles east of the tehsil capital Wazirabad.

== History ==
The history of Sohdra town dates back to before Christ. According to some history books, the history of this town is shared with Harappa and Mohenjodaro, as a town of Taxila period. The historical evidence of this town proves this to be true. The tombs of Nogs and the bricks laid thirty feet below the ground during the excavation are similar to Taxila, Mohenjodaro and Harappa. It is said about this town that it was settled by Mahmud Ghaznavi, which is completely wrong. This town was a famous Hindu city long Ghaznavi. There were many temples in this city. There was a big temple on the banks of Chenab river. Mahmud Ghaznavi's father, Subkatgin, had prayed that if a son was born to him, he would destroy the big Hindu temple of this town. When Mahmud Ghaznavi was born, his father destroyed the temple of this town. This town was called Sadhura. Which was a Hindu university. Sadhu saints who studied from this university preached to other countries in India. Because of this Sadhura University, the name of the town became Sadhura which later became Sohdra. According to Tarikh Ferishta, the area between Rachna Doab and River Chenab was called Sohdra Doab. Mahmud Ghaznavi also attacked India by making it his cantonment. Malik Ayaz, the governor of Mahmud Ghaznavi, had also built a hundred passes as a defensive wall of this town. Sultan Shahabuddin Ghori, like Mahmud Ghaznavi, made this town a base camp and attacked India again and again. Qutb-ud-din Aibak, a slave general of Sultan Shahab-ud-din Ghori, built a highest lengthy tower Peer manar between 1199 and 1220 on the banks of the Chenab River in this town to guide caravans traveling down the Chenab River and to monitor the northern attacks raiders. This minar was called Pir Minara, another name of Pir Qutb is Delhi Qutb Minar was also built by Qutbuddin Aybak during this period. The minar of this town could not be maintained later, it fell due to the earthquake and some people were also killed. Nowadays, the streets are called Makhla Pir Minara where this minar was. This town was a target for every army coming from the north. Be it Shahabuddin Ghori or Lodhi Mughal or Iranian Durrani or Abdali. This town was built in the style of a fort, but it was never destroyed Completely Its inhabitants were educated economists and doctors who were peaceful. During the Mughal era, this town developed a lot. Governor Sirhind Ali Mardan built a beautiful garden in the style of Shalamar Bagh in this town where today Wazirabad Sialkot road passes. Ali Mardan dug a canal for irrigation of this garden and fountains. Which was taken out of the Tawi river and linked to this garden by the canal. A person of knowledge and wisdom like Hazrat Sayed Ahmad sultan Sakhi Sarwar 1120 _1181 Wali Allah, received Education sohdra town school is also known as the Sakhi Darbar. Ustad was from Balakh Bukhara. Paji Ghaniya, the inventor of the Red Cross, was born in this town in 1648. His position in the Sikh religion is that of a Guru Siva panthi . In Sikh Gurdwaras around the world, Hindu Sikh Pai Ghaniya's Siva Panth Helping Charity feeds the poor. Helping people in Gurdwara Mandir in the name of Siva Panthi Guru Pai Kanhya ji . Ranjit Singh's smallpox disease was also treated by the Hakeem of this town. Ranjit Singh's religious mentor Pir Mustan Ali Shah was a resident of this town . Ranjeet Singh's also built a tomb on him when During the Sikh rule. It remained under the Sikh rule during the Ranjit Singh period, later the British took over and imposed terms. Among the famous political families, Awan, Malik, Arain, Kakezai, Cheema Rajput and the Ancient warrior tribe Kamboh/Kamboja (Cyrus the great)are notable. During British rule, the town became part of Wazirabad Tehsil, and it was located on the route of the North-Western railway. According to the 1901 census, the population of the town was 5,050, and it was administered as a notified area. In 2010, the population of the town was more than 115,000 according to Mr. Hafiz Malik Awais, son of Malik Muhamed Nazir, of Kakeyzaian Sodhra. It is a place of some antiquity, and it had given its name to the Chenab or to that part of it which lies in the plains, prior to the conquest of Mehmud Ghaznavi in 1008. The river then flowed close to the town in the north, but it is now over a mile away. During Maharaja Ranjit Singh's rule in the 19th century, Sodhra fort remained under the command of Sikh Army general Sulakhan Singh Puar.
