= Othian =

- Village
- Location within Pakistan
- Coordinates: 32.16°N 73.51°E
- Country: Pakistan
- Province: Punjab
- District: Gujranwala
- Time zone: UTC+5 (PST)

Othian is a village in Gujranwala District, of the Punjab province Pakistan. It is located near Gujranwala city.
