= Bharoke Cheema =

Town and union council in Punjab, Pakistan

Bharoke Cheema بھروک چیمہ Bharoki Cheema
- Town
- Location of Bharoke Cheema Bharoke Cheema (Pakistan)
- Coordinates: 32.3747682°N 74.0681314°E
- Country: Pakistan
- Province: Punjab
- District: Wazirabad
- Tehsil: Wazirabad
- Number of Union Councils: 1

Area
  - Total: 0.97 sq mi (2.50 km^{2})

Population
  - Estimate (2017): 7,263
- Time zone: UTC+05:00 (Pakistan Standard Time)
- Calling code: 055

Bharoke Cheema (Urdu: بھروک چیمہ), also spelled Bharoki Cheema, is a town and union council in Wazirabad Tehsil, Wazirabad District, Punjab, Pakistan.

== See also ==
- Gujranwala
- Wazirabad
