= Bara Pind =

Bara Pind may refer to:

== India ==
- Bara Pind, Jalandhar, a village in Jalandhar district, Punjab, India

== Pakistan ==
- Barapind, a village in Narowal district, Punjab, Pakistan
- Bara Pind, Wazirabad, a village in Wazirabad district, Punjab, Pakistan
