= Puar =

Puar may refer to:

- Pawar, a Maratha caste in western and central India
  - Puars of Dewas, 18th-20th century rulers
  - Puars of Dhar, 18th-20th century rulers
- Parmar (clan), a Rajput clan of northern India
- Pu'ar, a character in Dragon Ball
- Vikram Singh Rao II Puar (Vikram Singh Rao II Puar of Dewas Sr.)
- Mrunalini Devi Puar (1931–2015), Indian educator, Maharani of Dhar State (wife of HH Maharaja Anand Rao IV Puar of Dhar)
- Jasbir Puar, US-based queer theorist
- Sulakhan Singh Puar, 19th-century general of the Sukerchakia confederacy in Punjab

== See also ==
- Pawar (disambiguation)
- Puer (disambiguation)
