= Rehman Pura =

Rehman Pura, Saroke رحمان پورہ، ساروکی
- Locality
- Location in Pakistan
- Coordinates: 32.373037°N 73.989357°E
- Country: Pakistan
- Province: Punjab
- District: Gujranwala
- Town: Saroke

Rehman Pura (Urdu رحمان پورہ) is one of sub localities of Saroke in Gujranwala District, Pakistan. It is located to north of the town and lies south of Islamabad and southwest of Saeedabad.

== Inhabitants ==
Rehman Pura is a small locality. Peoples living in here are Rajputs shifted from main Saroke town.

== Education ==
Most of the children go to Rana Naveed Pilot Secondary School and Government schools.
