= Amir Cheema =

Pakistani Islamist (born 1977)

Amir Abdul Rehman Cheema (Urdu: عامر چیمہ; 4 Dec 1977 – 3 May 2006) was a Pakistani Muslim studying in Germany. After discovering the disrespectful cartoons written by Roger Köppel that attacked the sanctity of the Prophet of Islam, Cheema threatened the editor of the newspaper. He was captured by the German officials and tortured in prison for more than a month and was brutally killed in prison. German officials refused to take responsibility and labelled it as suicide and even refused to return the body back to Pakistan to Amir's grieving family.

On 3 May 2006, while awaiting trial and in German police custody, he was found dead in his cell.

Pakistanis questioned the German's official version of the story and three MPs from a coalition of religious parties introduced a motion in National Assembly of Pakistan to discuss the student's death. While rumors spread after his death that he was tortured in the German prison, the German authorities produced a suicide note for Pakistan's foreign office.

In the course of the investigation, the German judicial system concluded his death was a suicide.

== Funeral ==
Initially Germany refused to hand over Amir's body but upon growing public sympathy in Pakistan, it was repatriated to the town of Saroke near the city of Wazirabad, in Punjab on Saturday 13 May 2006. At least 30,000 people gathered for his funeral, including Islamic party activists and religious students. The gathered crowd protested Amir's alleged torture, Farid Piracha, a lawmaker from the Jamaat-i-Islami party, saying "The killing of Cheema was a barbaric act. He was killed by torture".
