= Kathala Chenab =

Kathala Chenab Kathala
- Town and union council
- Location within Pakistan
- Coordinates: 32.51°N 74.10°E
- Country: Pakistan
- Province: Punjab
- District: Gujrat District
- Kathala Chenab: 1820

Government
  - Type: Local
  - MNA: Chaudhry Pervaiz Elahi
  - MPA: Moonis Elahi

Area
  - Total: 10 km^{2} (3.9 sq mi)

Population
  - Total: 15 000
- Time zone: UTC+5 (PST)
- Postal code: 50700
- Area code: 009253

Kathala Chenab is a town and a union council of Gujrat District in the Punjab province of Pakistan. It is bordered by the Village Ghazi Chak. The Old name of ghazi chak is chak ghazi but after some it is called as ghazi chak and GT road on one side and touches Gujrat by-pass on the other side. Kathala Chenab is one of the largest towns in Gujrat in terms of both population and area.

== History and name ==
The name is thought to be a combination of two Punjabi words, Kath and Wala. When Jayitu Singh came to Gujrat he married the daughter of Raja Kunjh by a Swayamvara. He received a large area from Raja Kunjh as a reward, near the town Punjab. Later, this area was divided amongst his three sons and a daughter, named Samman, Mohla, Gorala, and Gorali, respectively. Today, these are all villages with the same names and the Kathala is the place where they meet to make decisions. In Punjabi such a meeting is called a Kath and the place is Kath Wala which is afterwards known as Kathala. Due to its location on the bank of the river Chenab, its name was changed to Kathala Chenab. There are many historical buildings and ruins in and around Gujrat. The Grand Trunk Road, commonly abbreviated as the GT road, was built by Emperor Sher Shah Suri. It also passes through Gujrat. The road still exists today, along with its period stone wall. The villages Gorala, Kunjah, Jalalpur Jattan, Mangowal and Kathala Chenab are historic villages, where many popular people such as poets lived.

== Economy ==
Agriculture was until recently the primary source of income of the people of Kathala. However, people increasingly migrate to Middle Eastern and Western countries to find more job opportunities. Most of the people of the Kathala are settled in Greece, Italy and Spain America England Canada. They send huge amount of money to their families to make them both ends meet. The fan industry and nayyar carpets are in the outer belt of Kathala Chenab. This industry facilitate people of Kathala and provide them new business dimensions.

== Religion ==
Sikhismis the religion of the people of Kathala Chenab. Afterwards when Islam came in Subcontinent then people of Kathala Chenab accepted Islam. Nowadays most people in Kathala are Muslims, and there are six mosques in the town, three of them are Jamiah. Majority of the people of Kathala are Sunni Islam, There is also a Mazar of Ghulam Shah wali. And also lived number of shia people . There is also an Imam Bargah Qasr e Zainab (sa) in the town. Christian minority also live in Kathala Chenab.

== Education ==
Beaconhouse School System is also shifted at GT road Kathala Chenab. There is 1 private sector and 2 public sector higher secondary schools. Government Primary School was established in 1896 in Kathala Chenab. Government Elementary School was established in 1956. Government High School was established in 1981 and converted into Higher Secondary in 2004. These two Higher Secondary Schools for boys and girls covers Kathala Chenab and also near by villages in the union council. Literacy ratio has also increased in the union council due to the up gradation of these schools to Higher Education. Most of the girls are getting education due to these public sector schools.

== Drinking water ==
Hand pumps were previously used for drawing drinking water, but most people have now shifted to electric-motor pumps. Traditionally, these pumps were fitted on the bore to a depth of 65 feet and the water quality was very high. However, good drinking water is no longer available at that depth, and people drill three hundred feet to get better quality water. The poor quality of drinking water has caused many illnesses. Now clean drinking water is available to every inhabitant of Kathala Chenab. The education rate is very high; there are doctors, lawyers, army officers, police officers, and bankers.

== Union council ==
Villages in the Union Council of Kathala Chenab include Kathala, Gorala, Gorali, Nat Pindi, Tara Garh, and New Gorala.

== River Chenab ==
Kathala Chenab is located on the main GT Road and on the backside it touches to the Chenab River. Chenab River has advantage and also some disadvantages. Before the 2000 floods came in Kathala Chenab and destroyed farms, cattle, houses and roads of Kathala Chenab. But now it is saved place due to some development by the government. There are many hotels, built on the bank of Chenab River near Kathala Chenab. Many people from Kathala Chenab and nearby villages and from Gujrat city came there for enjoyment on weekends.

== Housing colonies ==
As Kathala Chenab is an ancient and historical village, it is lacking proper planning. Slowly and gradually it is developing planned and authorized housing colonies and societies for the town. The center of the Gujrat River Garden is in Kathala Chenab, Gujrat's first TMA authorized housing colony.

Chenab Enclave Housing Scheme on GT Road Kathala is a new addition in this area. All houses are within half a kilometer from the main GT Road. The Chenab Enclave Housing Scheme includes community facilities such as parks, a child play area, basic sports facilities, a masjid, and a local market. The Beaconhouse School System, social security hospital, and city's largest Shahbaz sharif park are within walking distance.

== Parks ==
In Kathala Chenab there is a playground named Tajamal Hussain Joyland and Playing Ground. Also there is a jogging track. Some staggers are also there for little children of the town. Now there is new park is also under construction named Shahbaz Sharif park. The fenced park will have facilities like seating arrangement, mini zoo, joyland, gym, cafeterias, food courts/ restaurants and a 3D cinema. jogging tracks, an artificial lake for boating, open swimming pool, roads, fountains, log huts, gazebos.

== Notable people ==
- International Kabaddi Player Ali Warraich

== See also ==
- Kathala railway station
