= Mazhar ul Islam (disambiguation) =

Mazhar ul Islam, meaning "light of Islam", may refer to:

- Muzharul Islam (1923–2012), Bangladeshi architect
- Mazharul Islam (poet) (1929–2003), Bangladeshi poet and academic
- Mazhar ul Islam (born 1949), Pakistani short story writer and novelist
- Mazhar-ul-Islam (cricketer) (1950s–1978), Bangladeshi cricketer
- Mazharul Islam Himel (born 1988), Bangladeshi footballer
- Mazharul Islam Suzon, Bangladeshi politician
