= Nat Kalan =

Town and Union Council in Pakistan

Nat Kalan نت کلاں Natt Kalan
- Village
- Location of Nat Kalan Nat Kalan (Pakistan)
- Coordinates: 32°18′N 74°9′E
- Country: Pakistan
- Province: Punjab
- District: Gujranwala
- Number of Union Councils: 1

Area
  - Total: 1.9 sq mi (5 km^{2})

Population
  - Estimate (2017): 11,709
- Time zone: UTC+05:00 (Pakistan Standard Time)
- Postal code type: 52201
- Calling code: 055
- Website: https://www.facebook.com/Natkalan.11

Nat Kalan (Urdu: نت کلاں), also spelled as Natt Kalan, is a town and union council in Wazirabad Tehsil, Gujranwala District, Punjab, Pakistan.

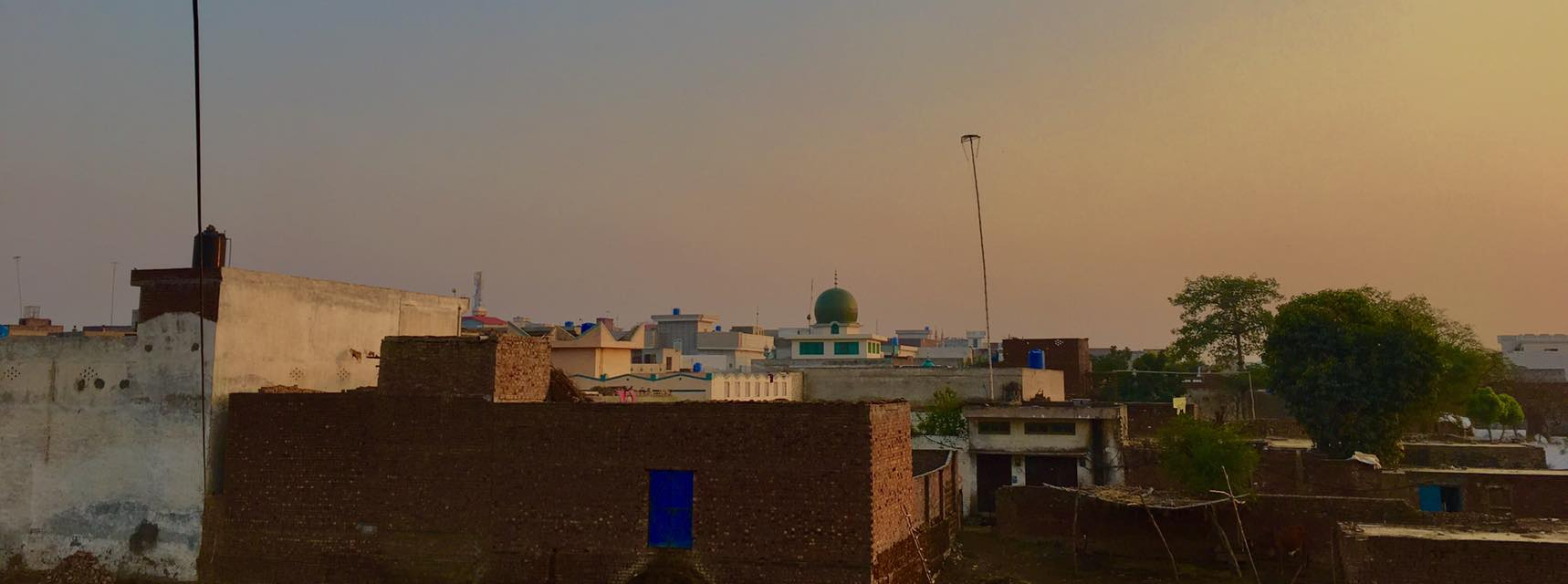
Jamia Masjid-e-Noor

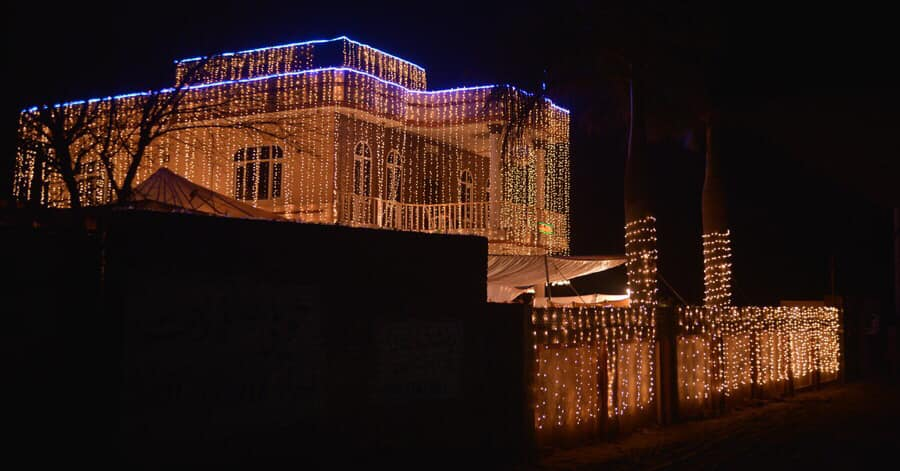
The famed Manj House located in the northern part of Nat Kalan

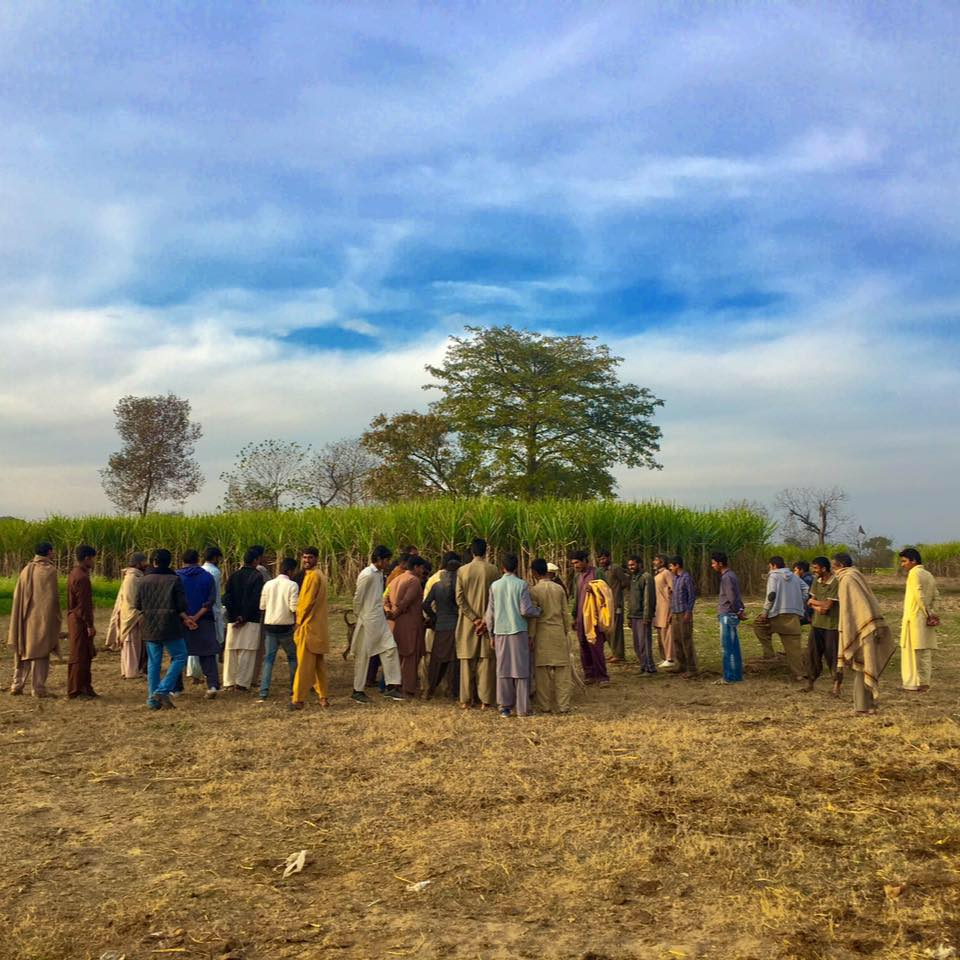
Villagers of Nat Kalan witnessing a dog fight in action

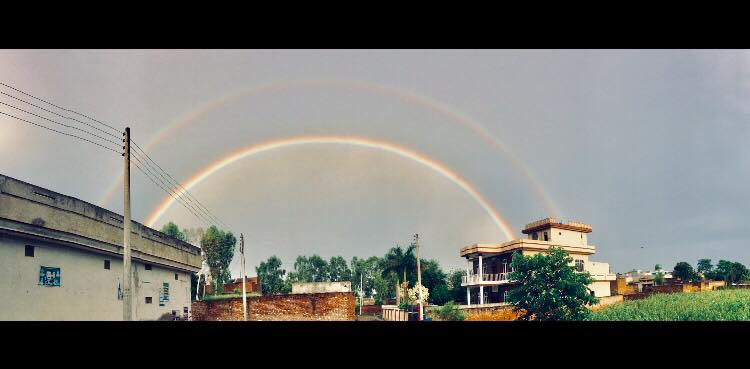
A rare double rainbow appearing in Nat Kalan

Khas-o-Khashak Zamane (خس و خاشاک زمانے), a novel by the famed Pakistani author Mustansar Hussain Tarar, focuses on 100 years of history and how the partition of India affected the Nat Kalan village.
