= Hairanwala Kalan =

Village in Punjab, Pakistan

Coordinates: 32°23′N 74°12′E

Hairanwala Kalan is a village in Wazirabad Tehsil, in the Gujranwala District of Punjab, Pakistan.

The village is surrounded by farmland, and the area is known for its fertile soil and wheat, rice, and sugarcane production.

The village is also home to a number of green spaces, including orchards and gardens. A number of the villagers grow their own vegetables and fruits in small home gardens, which are not only a source of fresh produce but also add to the village's overall greenery.
