= Shaikh Rajada =

Shaikh Rajada Shaikherjada
- Village
- Location of Shaikh Rajada Shaikh Rajada (Pakistan)
- Coordinates: 32°10′23″N 74°15′21″E
- Country: Pakistan
- Province: Punjab
- District: Gujjranwala
- Tehsil: Gujranwala
- Founder: (sardar sajada )
- Elevation: 229 m (751 ft)

Population
  - Total: 2,000
- Time zone: UTC+05:00

Shaikh Rajada, also spelled Shaikherjada, is a village on Pasroor Road in Gujranwala District in Punjab, Pakistan. It has a population of around 5000 as of 2021. It is said that the village is named after a person called Shaikhu who had three brothers named Pandu, Gagard and Azam so the surrounding villages are named after them i.e. Pandupur, Gagarke, and Thata Azam Khan, respectively. It is located at 32°10′20″N 75°15′30″E.

90% of population is Muslim and around 10% are Christians. Punjabi is the mother tongue of villagers. The village mainly houses the population of the Buttar clan of Jat tribe but members of the Cheema, Chatha, Virk, and Minhas clans, etc. are also part of the population.

== Education ==
The village has government primary schools for boys and girls. However, since it is located near the city, over 30% of the children enroll at the main city's schools. The literacy rate of the village is nearly 60%.

== Economy ==
The population's main source of income here is agriculture. Nearly 70% of population is, directly or indirectly, affiliated with agriculture. The main crops of the village are rice, wheat and strawberry. Being near the main city, Shaikh Rajada is growing very fast in terms of population. Moreover, the village is exposed to brick kiln.
