= Attempted assassination of Ahmad Shah Durrani =

Assassination plot against Ahmad Shah Durrani
Date	c. 1748
Location	Shamali Shahr, near Kandahar, Durrani Empire
Result	Plot suppressed

Belligerents
Durrani Empire	Afghan tribal chiefs

Commanders and leaders
Ahmad Shah Durrani	Nur Muhammad Khan Alizai (executed); Muhabbat Khan Popalzai (executed); Kadu Khan (executed); Osman Khan Topchibashi (executed)

Casualties and losses
None	All executed

Around 1748, a failed assassination attempt of Ahmad Shah Durrani was made by dissident Afghan chiefs during the early consolidation of the Durrani Empire.

== Background ==
In November 1748, Ahmad Shah began his second invasion of India. Moin-ul-Mulk, the new governor of Punjab, urgently requested reinforcement from the Mughals in Delhi. Moin-ul-Mulk, who wanted to avoid fighting the Afghans on open plains, remained on the defensive at Sodhra, as an ongoing power struggle with Nasir Khan, the former Mughal governor of Kabul, threatened his position. As a result, Jahan Khan was able to raid the countryside, including the Chaj Doab, whilst a party of Sikhs raided Lahore.

Ahmad Shah advanced to Kopra and engaged in skirmishes with Moin-ul-Mulk's army. Overwhelmed with the rising power of the Sikhs and the Afghan invasion, Moin-ul-Mulk opened negotiations, ceding the revenues of Gujrat, Aurangabad, Sialkot, and Pasrur. These districts generated yearly revenues of 1.4 million rupees. Ahmad Shah returned to Afghanistan following the treaty, crossing through Peshawar, Dera Ismail Khan, and Dera Ghazi Khan. The regions of Dera Ismail Khan and Dera Ghazi Khan fell as he returned to Afghanistan, confirming the former tribal chiefs as governors in the region under his suzerainty.

== Plot ==
On Ahmad Shah Durrani’s return to Kandahar following his early campaigns in the Punjab and the Derajat, a serious conspiracy to assassinate him was uncovered shortly before its intended execution. The plot was led by Nur Muhammad Khan Alizai, a prominent Afghan chief who had formerly commanded Afghan troops under Nader Shah Afshar. Following the collapse of the Afsharid regime and the rise of Ahmad Shah, Nur Muhammad Khan was deprived of his former command, though he was retained within the new political order and honored with the title of Mir-i-Afghan.

Despite these honors, Nur Muhammad Khan wanted resentment over his loss of authority and influence. Motivated by his ambitions and jealousy toward the rapid consolidation of power by Ahmad Shah, he began organizing a clandestine conspiracy against the Shah’s life. He drew into the plot several other Afghan chiefs, including Muhabbat Khan Popalzai, Kadu Khan, and Osman Khan Topchibashi, all of whom were reportedly unsettled by Ahmad Shah’s expanding authority and growing prestige among the Afghan tribes.

The conspirators planned to assassinate the Shah at an eminence known as Maqsud Shah, located in the village of Shamali Shahr, a northern suburb of Kandahar. Shortly before the plot could be carried out, one of the conspirators disclosed the plan to Ahmad Shah, enabling him to act decisively and prevent the assassination.

Ahmad Shah responded with swift and quick respond. Nur Muhammad Khan Alizai and the other conspirators were executed at the very site where the assassination had been planned. In accordance with contemporary tribal and political norms, collective punishment was imposed that ten men from each of the tribes most deeply implicated in the conspiracy were also put to death. This practice reflected prevailing concepts of collective responsibility and deterrence in cases of treason and conspiracy.

== Aftermath ==
These executions marked the first instances of capital punishment ordered by Ahmad Shah during his reign and caused considerable unease among the Afghan tribal elite. Some chiefs questioned the Shah’s authority to impose death sentences and briefly agitated for limitations on his power, even debating whether the principle of retaliation should be applied against the Shah himself and his family.

== Sources ==
- Lee, Jonathan L. (8 March 2022). Afghanistan: A History from 1260 to the Present. Reaktion Books. ISBN 978-1-78914-019-4.
- Noelle-Karimi, Christine (1997). State and Tribe in Nineteenth-century Afghanistan: The Reign of Amir Dost Muhammad Khan (1826-1863). Psychology Press. ISBN 978-0-7007-0629-7.
- Singh, Ganda (1959). Ahmad Shah Durrani: Father of Modern Afghanistan. Asia Publishing House. ISBN 978-1-4021-7278-6.
- Mehta, Jaswant Lal (1 January 2005). Advanced Study in the History of Modern India 1707-1813. Sterling Publishers. ISBN 978-1-932705-54-6.
