= Pathanke Cheema =

Village in Punjab, Pakistan

- Village
- Location within Pakistan
- Coordinates: 32°19′08″N 73°58′18″E
- Country: Pakistan
- Province: Punjab
- District: Gujranwala

Area
  - Total: 1.75 km^{2} (0.68 sq mi)

Population
  - Estimate: 1,715
- Time zone: UTC+5 (PST)
- Calling code: 055

Pathanke Cheema is a small village located to the west of Ahmad Nagar Chattha, Tehsial Wazirabad, Gujranwala District, Punjab, Pakistan. For education Government Boys Primary School (Combined) is functional, by the Government of Punjab under the Board of Intermediate and Secondary Education, Gujranwala. For basic essentials people visit Ahmad Nagar Chattha, to which Pathanke Cheema has road connection to the east. It is also linked by road to Kub Pora Cheema to the west. In the village, 80% population is Muslim and 20% Christian. Most of the population engages in farming, while some run small shops.

== See also ==
- Mohlunke
- Kub Pora Cheema
- Chabba Cheema
