= Nowshera Virkan, Punjab =

Nowshera Virkan نوشہرہ ورکاں
- Town
- Location in Pakistan Nowshera Virkan (Pakistan)
- Coordinates: 31.962240°N 73.972581°E
- Country: Pakistan
- Region: (Punjab, Pakistan) Punjab
- District: Gujranwala

Population (2023)
  - Total: 59,639
- Time zone: UTC+05:00 (PST)
  - Summer (DST): UTC+06:00 (PDT)
- Postal code: 52370
- Area code: 055

Nowshera Virkan (Urdu: نوشہره وِركاں) is a town situated to the west of the industrial city of Gujranwala, in Punjab, Pakistan. Nowshera Virkan is a hub of rice-growing villages.

== Demographics ==
=== Population ===
According to the 2023 census Nowshera Virkan city had a population of 59,639.

Historical population
Year	Pop.	±% p.a.
1998	33,940	—
2017	49,377	+1.99%
2023	59,639	+3.20%

=== Languages ===
Languages of Nowshera Virkan city (2023 Census)
1. Punjabi (98.4%)
2. Urdu (1.00%)
3. Others (0.60%)
