= Shaista Nuzhat =

Punjabi poet, writer, linguist, and researcher on Punjabi language and literature

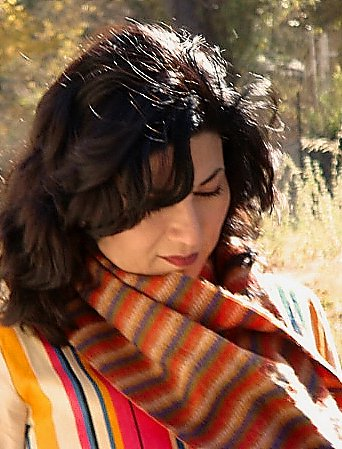
- Born: 25 November; Gujranwala, Punjab, Pakistan
- Education: Ph.D in Philosophy
- Alma mater: University of Punjab
- Occupations: Linguist, poet, writer, civil servant
- Spouse: Naseem Sajid

Shaista Nuzhat (Punjabi: شائستہ نُزہت (Shahmukhi)) (born 1963) is a Punjabi poet, writer, linguist, and researcher on Punjabi language and literature. She is founder director of the Punjab Institute of Language, Art and Culture (PILAC) in Lahore.

== Biography ==
=== Early life and education ===
Shaista belongs to Gujranwala District, Punjab, Pakistan. She gained a Ph.D. in Philosophy from the University of the Punjab, Lahore. She is popularly known as a poet in Punjabi and Urdu, a columnist, and a writer, and has been prominent in public speaking.

=== Career ===
Shaista started her career as a lecturer in philosophy and later as a journalist. She has worked as a sub-editor in various national daily newspapers. She holds the portfolio of a public sector official and bureaucrat, working with the Government of Pakistan. She is alumni of National Institute of Management (NIM), Lahore and attended 12th Senior Management Course (SMC).

=== PILAC ===
Shaista has worked to promote Punjabi language, literature, art and culture. As a result of her efforts, the Punjab Legislative Assembly passed a bill for the establishment of an institution named the Punjab Institute of Language, Art & Culture, which started functioning, initially, in 2005, in a rented building at Shadman Colony, Lahore, as part of the Ministry of Information, Culture and Youth Affairs, with Shaista as the founding director. The Institute brought together Punjabi writers, poets, and journalists in the PILAC (commonly known as Punjabi Complex), at 01-Qaddafi Stadium, Ferozpur Road, Lahore, with the support of Chaudhry Pervaiz Elahi, the Ex. Chief Minister, Punjab. PILAC has been functioning from this complex since 2007, after an inauguration by Elahi. Shaista also started Pakistan's first Punjabi FM-radio channel named FM-Pechanway (FM-95) Punjab Rang, under the umbrella of PILAC, broadcasting from the Punjabi Complex.

=== Foreign tours ===
Shaista has visited Saudi Arabia, Bahrain, Thailand, India, UK, France, Denmark, Norway, Sweden, Netherlands, Singapore, United Arab Emirates, Hong Kong-China, South Korea, and Sri Lanka, to deliver lectures and research papers in connection with promoting the Punjabi language.

== Publications ==
Sr. No.	Title	Detail	Year
1	TUM	Urdu Poetry	2017
2	My Debut in Journalism	A compilation of published articles and columns, by Zulfikar Ali Bhutto in different international magazines and newspapers on his period as a student	2012
3	Manto Se Milyay	Stage Play	2011
4	Ik Seeti Maar Mitra	A transliteration of short stories by Amarta Pritam	2008
5	Aqal te Ishq	A transliteration of Sufi poetry of Khushhal Khan Khattak	2008
6	Chaway Fareed	Sindhi translation of Kalam Baba Fareed-ud-Din Ganj Shakar with English, Urdu, and Gurumukhi script	2008
7	Our Legendary Intellectuals	Supervision of preparation and publishing of translation of poetry of seven Sufi Poets of Punjab	2008
8	Darshan Patno Paar	A book of Punjabi poetry	2007
9	Roedaad	Compilation of proceedings of Inter-Provincial Cultural Conference 2005	2006
10	Mirza Sahiban	A revised poetic version of fol lore of Punjab	2006
11	Imranyat-e-Waris Shah	A book in Urdu and Gurumukhi on Sociological Philosophy of Waris Shah. Also been translated by Indian Universities in Gurumukhi	2006
12	Research Papers on Guru Grahnth Sahib	Research papers	2005
13	Bil Aakhir	A book of Urdu and Punjabi poetry	1993

== Awards and honors ==
Title	Awarded By	Year	Ref
Interfaith Harmony Award	Principal Officer of American Consulate, Lahore	2008	
Award of Excellence in Culture	Government of Punjab	2007	
Guru Nanak Heritage of Interfaith Understanding Award	United States	2006	
Ambassador of Peace Award	Seoul, South Korea	2006	
208th Waris Shah Award	Waris Shah Academy, Jandiala Sher Khan	2006	
Delhi Tax Bar Association Award	Delhi	2006	
Sahir Ludhianvi Award		2006	
Khawaja Fareed Sangat Award	Lahore	2005	
Adeeb International Award	India	2005	
Award of Excellence	Department of Philosophy, University of Punjab	2003	
Poetess of the Year Award	Lahore Gymkhana	2002	
Waris Shah Award	Ministry of Information, Culture and Youth Affairs Department, Govt. of Punjab	2002	
