= Douburji Virkan =

Douburji Virkan is a village in Nowshera Virkan Tehsil, Gujranwala District, Punjab, Pakistan. It is part of the National Assembly constituency NA-100.
