= Shaukat Manzoor Cheema =

Pakistani politician (1954–2020)

Member of the Provincial Assembly of the Punjab
- In office 15 August 2018 – 3 June 2020
- In office 2008 – 31 May 2018

Personal details
- Born: 15 January 1954 Wazirabad
- Died: 3 June 2020 (aged 66)
- Party: Pakistan Muslim League (N)

Shaukat Manzoor Cheema (Urdu: شوکت منظور چیمہ, 15 January 1954 – 3 June 2020) was a Pakistani politician who was a Member of the Provincial Assembly of the Punjab from 2008 to May 2020.

== Early life and education ==
Cheema was born on 15 January 1954 in Wazirabad.

He graduated in 2005 from the University of the Punjab and held a Bachelor of Arts degree.

== Political career ==
Cheema was elected to the Provincial Assembly of the Punjab as a candidate of the Pakistan Muslim League (N) (PML-N) from Constituency PP-104 (Gujranwala-XIV) in the 2008 Pakistani general election. He received 41,217 votes and defeated a candidate of Pakistan Peoples Party.

He was re-elected to the Provincial Assembly of the Punjab as a candidate of PML-N from Constituency PP-104 (Gujranwala-XIV) in the 2013 Pakistani general election.

He was re-elected to the Provincial Assembly of the Punjab as a candidate of PML-N from Constituency PP-51 (Gujranwala-I) in the 2018 Pakistani general election.

== Death ==
Cheema died on 3 June 2020, after contracting COVID-19 during the COVID-19 pandemic in Pakistan. He had been under treatment at a hospital in Lahore, and was reportedly on ventilator support.
