= Gill Wala =

Place in Punjab, Pakistan

- Village
- Location within Pakistan
- Coordinates: 32°17′33″N 74°03′02″E
- Country: Pakistan
- Province: Punjab
- District: Gujranwala

Government

Area
  - Total: 2.68 km^{2} (1.03 sq mi)

Population
  - Estimate (2017): 5,968
- Time zone: UTC+5 (PST)
- Calling code: 055

Gil Wala, also spelled as Gill Wala, is a small village in Wazirabad Tehsil, Gujranwala District, Punjab, Pakistan. Gil Wala is located east of the villages Kale Wala and Banka Cheema.
