= PAF Base Chandhar =

Chandhar Air Base
- IATA: none; ICAO: none

Summary
- Airport type: Military
- Owner: PAF
- Operator: Pakistan Air Force
- Location: Chandhar, Gujranwala, Pakistan
- Elevation AMSL: 620 ft (190 m)
- Coordinates: 32°04′40″N 73°47′25″E

Map
- Location of airport in Pakistan

Runways
Direction	Length		Surface
Direction	ft	m	Surface
05/23	9,000	2,743	Asphalt

PAF Base Chandhar, or Chandhar Airbase, is a Pakistan Air Force airbase located near Chandhar, a town in District Gujranwala in the province of Punjab in Pakistan.

== Facilities ==
An airbase under the PAF's Central Air Command, it lies at an elevation of 620 feet (189 m) above mean sea level. It has one runway designated 05/23 with an asphalt surface measuring 9,000 by 75 feet (2,743 m × 23 m).
