= Saroke =

Town in Gujranwala district, Pakistan

Saroke ساروکی
- Town
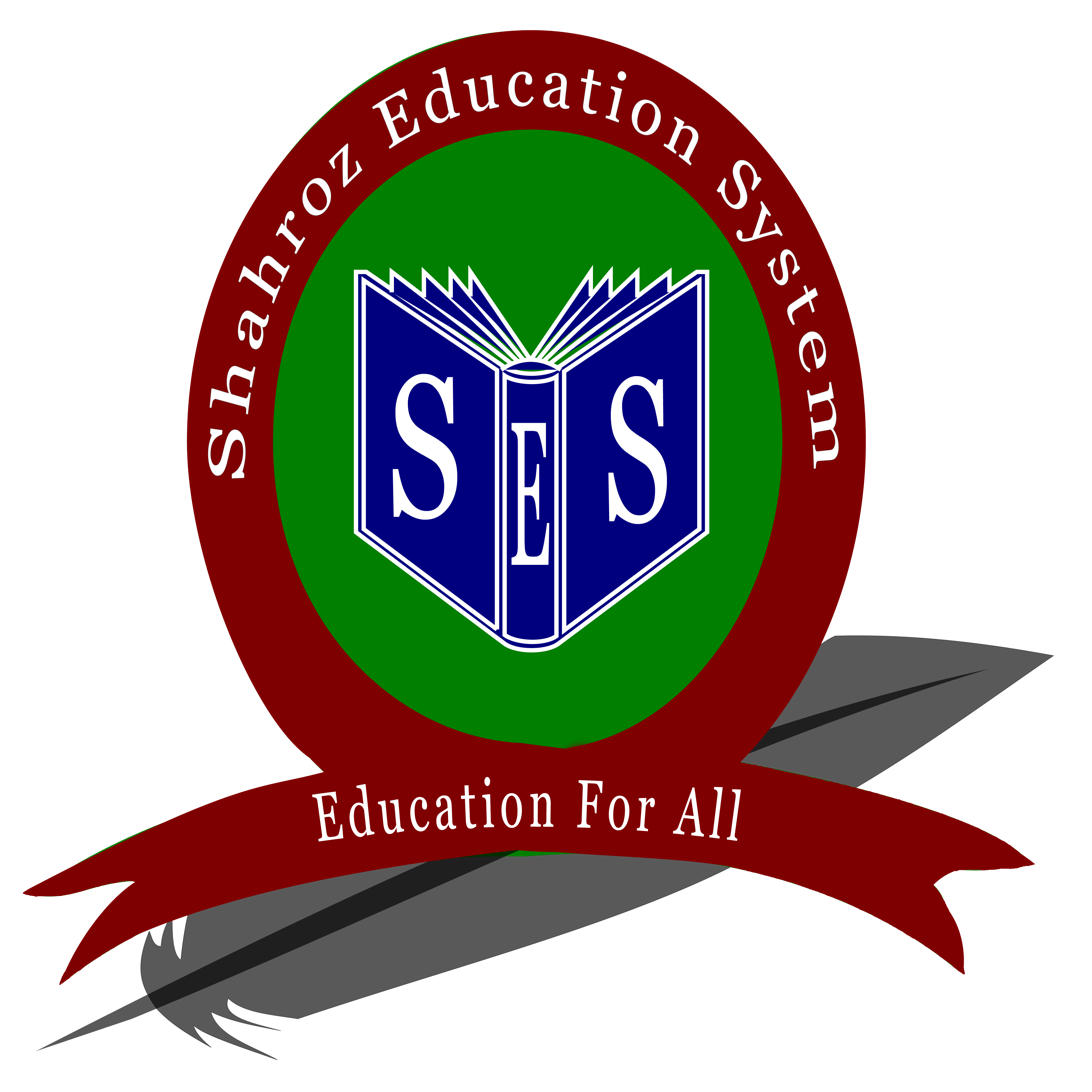
- SES Logo

- Location in Pakistan
- Coordinates: 32°21′21″N 73°59′13″E
- Country: Pakistan
- Province: Punjab
- District: Gujranwala
- Established: 4 September 2012

Saroke (Urdu ساروکی), sometimes Saroki or Saroki Cheema, is a town located on the southwest side of the city of Wazirabad in Gujranwala district of Punjab, Pakistan. It lies south of Khanki Head, southwest of Mansoorwali, east of Dharowal, and north of Ahmad Nagar Chatta.

Saroke is the main point of all the nearest towns and villages. All the villages near it are dependent on it, because it has facilities likes schools, hospitals and markets.

== History ==
It has existed since the area was controlled by Sikhs. It is the most populous town in the sub-district (Tehsil) of Wazirabad and was not widely known before the Martyrdom of Amir Abdur Rehman Cheema. It is the most populous town in the sub-district of Wazirabad.

== Education ==
Saroke is known as an educational hub in the area. There are several schools including a government high school for boys, a government high school for girls, Pakistan Model Higher Secondary school, Haider Memorial School, and several other private schools. There are also a number of academies in Saroke including the Shahroz Education System Academy and Sultan Commerce Academy.

== Division ==
Saroke is divided into several parts.

=== Main Town ===
Most of the population live in the main town. Most educational institutions, clinics, and hospitals are also in the main town. The main town is subdivided into Mohallas (like sub-localities). These include:

- Mohallah Shamali
- Mohallah Baagh Wala
- Androoni Mohallah
- Mohallah Shahzinda Wali
- Mohallah Faisalabad
- Mohallah Haji Arab
- Mohallah Janoobi

=== Sub Localities ===
- Islamabad, (Urdu اسلام آباد) is located to the far north of the town and lies west of Saeedabad, northwest of Rehman Pura and East of Faqeeranwali Khurd. Peoples living in Islamabad are immigrants of Kashmir who migrated as the result of First Kashmir war.
- Rehman Pura, (Urdu رحمان پورہ) is located north of the town and lies southeast of Islamabad and southwest of Saeedabad. It is a small locality. Peoples living here are Rajputs shifted from the main Saroki town.
- Faqeeranwali Khurd, (Urdu فقیرانوالی خورد) is located northwest of the town and lies west of Islamabad. Faqeeranwali is not populous as compared to Islamabad.
- Jeune Wali is located to east of the Town.

== Sports ==
Cricket, football and kabaddi are very popular sports in Saroke.

== Climate ==
Saroke has a hot semi-arid climate (BSh), according to the Köppen-Geiger system, and changes throughout the year. During summer (June to September), the temperature reaches 35–41 °C (95–106 °F). The coldest months are usually November to February when the temperature can drop to an average of 6 °C (43 °F). The highest precipitation months are usually July and August when the monsoon reaches Punjab.

Climate data for Saroke
Month	Jan	Feb	Mar	Apr	May	Jun	Jul	Aug	Sep	Oct	Nov	Dec	Year
Mean daily maximum °C (°F)	19.3 (66.7)	22.2 (72.0)	27.5 (81.5)	33.7 (92.7)	39.2 (102.6)	41 (106)	36.4 (97.5)	34.8 (94.6)	35.2 (95.4)	33.2 (91.8)	27.3 (81.1)	21.4 (70.5)	30.9 (87.7)
Daily mean °C (°F)	12.3 (54.1)	15.1 (59.2)	20.3 (68.5)	26 (79)	31.2 (88.2)	34 (93)	31.6 (88.9)	30.4 (86.7)	29.5 (85.1)	25.4 (77.7)	18.8 (65.8)	13.5 (56.3)	24.0 (75.2)
Mean daily minimum °C (°F)	5.3 (41.5)	8 (46)	13.2 (55.8)	18.4 (65.1)	23.2 (73.8)	27 (81)	26.8 (80.2)	26 (79)	23.9 (75.0)	17.7 (63.9)	10.3 (50.5)	5.6 (42.1)	17.1 (62.8)
Average precipitation mm (inches)	31 (1.2)	31 (1.2)	29 (1.1)	19 (0.7)	18 (0.7)	42 (1.7)	145 (5.7)	164 (6.5)	63 (2.5)	8 (0.3)	6 (0.2)	15 (0.6)	571 (22.4)
Source: Climate-Data.org, altitude: 225m
