= Jaura, Wazirabad =

Town and Union Council in Wazirabad Tehsil

Jaura جورا
- Town
- Location of Jaura Jaura (Pakistan)
- Coordinates: 32.2123494°N 74.1246067°E
- Country: Pakistan
- Province: Punjab
- District: Wazirabad
- Tehsil: Wazirabad
- Number of Union Councils: 1

Area
  - Total: 1.5 sq mi (4 km^{2})

Population
  - Estimate (2017): 4,671
- Time zone: UTC+05:00 (Pakistan Standard Time)
- Calling code: 055

Jaura (Urdu: جورا) is a town and union council in Wazirabad Tehsil, Wazirabad District, of the Punjab province, Pakistan.

== See also ==
- Gujranwala
- Ahmad Nagar
