= Banka Cheema =

Village in Punjab, Pakistan

Banka Cheema بنکا چیمہ
- Town
- Location of Banka Cheema Banka Cheema (Pakistan)
- Coordinates: 32.29°N 74.09°E
- Country: Pakistan
- Province: Punjab
- District: Gujranwala
- Tehsil: Wazirabad

Government
  - Chairman Union council Gujranwala: Ch. Ansir Mukhtar Sandhu

Area
  - Total: 1.00 sq mi (2.60 km^{2})

Population
  - Estimate (2017): 9,137
- Time zone: UTC+05:00 (PKT)
- Postal code type: 52201
- Calling code: 055

Banka Cheema (pronounced: Beanka Cheema and Benka Chima) is a village and union council of Wazirabad Tehsil, Gujranwala District, in Pakistan's Punjab province. A post office is functional in Banka Cheema by Pakistan Post under Government of Pakistan. Government Primary School Banka Cheema and Government Girls High School (GGHS) Banka Cheema of the Government of Punjab under the Board of Intermediate and Secondary Education, Gujranwala are functional in the village. The only way to reach Banka Cheema is by road. 97% population of the town is Muslim..
