= Chandhar =

Chandhar چندر Sardara Da Pind
- Town
- Chandhar
- Location of Chandhar Chandhar (Pakistan)
- Coordinates: 32.105°N 73.810°E
- Country: Pakistan
- Province: Punjab
- District: Gujranwala

Government

Area
  - Total: 0.77 sq mi (2 km^{2})

Population
  - Estimate (2017): 5,009
- Time zone: UTC+5 (PST)
  - Summer (DST): +5
- Calling code: 055

Chandhar (Urdu: چندھر) is a small village in the Gujranwala District of Punjab, Pakistan. It houses PAF Base Chandhar of the Pakistan Air Force.
