= Puer =

Puer may refer to:

- Pu'er tea, a variety of fermented tea, named after Pu'er in Yunnan Province
- Old Pu'er, present-day Ning'er Hani and Yi Autonomous County, China
- Pu'er City, a prefecture-level city in Yunnan, China, formerly known as Simao County
- Puer (geomancy), a geomantic figure

== See also ==
- Puer aeternus, Latin for 'eternal boy'
- Puer mingens, Latin for an artistic depiction of a boy urinating
- Puer oblatus, Latin for an oblate who has not yet reached puberty
- Puering or bating, a process using dog excrement or 'puer', as a step in the tanning of leather
- Puar (disambiguation)
