= Kathala railway station =

Railway station in Pakistan

Coordinates: 32.505261°N 74.093957°E

General information
- Owner: Ministry of Railways

Other information
- Station code: KTL

History
- Former names: Great Indian Peninsula Railway
Location

Kathala railway station (Urdu: کٹھالہ ریلوے اسٹیشن) is located in town of Kathala Chenab, Gujrat District, Pakistan.

== See also ==
- List of railway stations in Pakistan
- Pakistan Railways
