= Uggu Chak =

Village in Punjab, Pakistan

Uggu Chak (Urdu: اُگو چک is a populated village of Gujranwala District, Punjab, Pakistan. Uggu Chak is one of the biggest UC's of the Gujranwala City with strong political background and highly populated area. Situated on the Hafiz Abad Gujranwala Road, 13 Km west of the city of Gujranwala. It is having canal on one side of the village main road bisects the village in two parts. It has many hamlets like Sheikhanwala, Hondlanwala, Sajjadaywala and Pakka Khuh. Its surrounding villages and towns are Papnakha, Hardupur, Sahanki, Maan, Piru Kot and Qila Didar Singh.

== Etymology ==
Uggu chak is an old village named after the name of a Muslim who owned this territory, known as Uggu. It was situated on the Tibba (Teppa- Persian) or high ground, allocated to the Warraich Calan. His estate included a large area of land of the nearby villages.

== History ==
This area consisted of meadows, where he used to graze their herds. A residential area was established in the middle of that land and was called as Uggu Chak. The village was predominantly Muslim but had a sizeable Hindu and Sikh population, which left it in 1947, at the time of partition. There were pagan schedule caste people and most of them converted to Christianity and continued living in their enclosure to the southeast of the main village. Some Sansi families converted to Islam on the hand of Maulana Mohammad Fazil (1929-1997). At the time of partition, a number of refugees from Patiala state and Amritsar District settled there and replaced the Hindu/Sikh population. There was another wave of migration from Jammu and Kashmir in 1948-49. They settled in the east of the village across the pond, on a piece of land donated by Ch Ghulam Haider Warriach. The buildings of the Hindu Dharamsala and the temple were used as residences of the refugees. There was no trace of Gurudawara in 1955 and it is doubted whether one existed in the pre-partition days.

== Education ==
The Primary School was established for boys in 1955. It was under the district board and later it became Government School. The girls' school was established in 1967, with the personal efforts of Maulana Mohammad Fazil, whose daughter was the first teacher of that school. The boys school had produced many eminent educated people who had gained a great name in their respective fields. There are three government Schools one for boys up to elementary level and One for Girls elementary school and one Primary School of Girls also present here. About 170 girls study in the GGES and 300 in GGPS. These schools facilitate the people for quality education at a stone's throw. Earlier young girls and boys had to travel to The Town Qila Didar Singh for continuing Education beyond class Five leading to many roadside mishaps. Besides Govt schools, a few English medium type schools are also present in the village one of the oldest schools known as Ikraam Ideal School. Most of the people are nowadays interested in sending their children to English Medium schools like Educators, Allied school, Smart School, City School, Spirit school, Dar e Arqam in Qila Didar Singh town and its peripheries.

== Trade and business ==
The village has no market or a bazaar but has a number of scattered shops. These shops dealt in grocery, cloth and commodities of day to day use. The hawkers sold vegetables and fruits. On the main roadside, a number of shops have appeared. There were two melas (annual festivals), celebrated; one by Hakim Rafie and the other by Baba Rahm Rahm. There were temporary shops opened during those days and Sufi music was played. Slowly and gradually, those festivities have become a memory of the past. The agricultural produce was purchased by few people like Ramzan Kumhar, Ghulam Rasul Kashmir and few other people. They used to sell it in the markets. Then bigger landholders were directly selling to the urban markets.

== Prominent people ==
There is no record of Hindu and Sikhs reaching to any prominent place. Once they migrated to India, contact was lost with them. Hakim Rafi's father Imam Din Uggu Chakya was a great calligraphist and traditional healer. Hakim Rafi himself did calligraphy with his son Mian Kalu and Abdu Rahman. Aziz watchmaker, Maulavi Daud Post Office head, Chaudhary Ata Ullah Sidhu(مرحوم) (Chairman of Union Council), Chaudhary Ghulam Rasool Sidhu(مرحوم), Maulana Ahmad Ali, Haji Ramzan Nambardar, Haji Ramzan Chota, Master Ismaiel(مرحوم), Cahanan Patwari, Zia Ullah Warraich, Hakim Nazir, and Maulana Mohammad Fazil (nephew and son-in-law of great scholar, Sheikh Ul Hadith Hafiz Gondalwai, who was himself HOD in Islamia University, Madina and Ameer of Jamiat Ehl-e-Hadith Pakistan) were prominent personalities. According to an oral account narrated by Abdul Hamid Butt, during the communal violence surrounding the Partition of 1947, two Hindu girls approached Maulana Fazil and sought his protection. Maulana Fazil provided them with safety and shelter during the unrest. He later personally accompanied them to Qila Miyan Singh, from where they joined a caravan travelling to India. Maulana Muhammad Fazal was also invited on several occasions by members of the Saudi royal King during his pilgrimages. The most preponderant one to remembers is Ch.Ghulam Rasool Sidhu(مرحوم) and his sons, Shahbaz Ahmed Sidhu, Iqbal Sidhu, Faiz ur Rehman (مرحوم), Riaz Ahmed, Ch.Abdulrehaman Sidhu (مرحوم) and Ch.Abbas Ahmed Sidhu (US). Currently, Shahbaz Ahmed Sidhu is one of the great leading personality, with their voice of truth for poor & destitute people. He's also known by their imported Big beast Tractors. Chaudhry Attique ur rehman Sidhu was elected as Chairman of UC 50 in 2016. He's son of Ex-Chairman of Chaudhry Atta ullah Sidhu that's have strong political background since 1962. Moreover, Master Isamiel(مرحوم) was a BD member of the Union Council and well respected educated person. Baba Haji Ramzan was an interesting personality of his own kind, who was murdered. Master Fazal Mohammad is remembered and his son Mian Asghar became an engineer. There were physicians like Brig (R) Waheed Uz Zaman Tariq (a well-known Consultant Medical Virologist, who has served in England, Pak Army, and after his retirement, he joined Tawam Hospital, Al Ain, United Arab Emirates. In 2019 he came back to Pakistan and had settled in Lahore. He had been on many committees of UN and WHO and a scholar of Persian literature and has authored many books. He is an authority on Allama Iqbal's teachings and got more than two dozens of Gold Medals. During Covid 19, he served as an advisory for the Government of Pakistan. Moreover, he was announced as a recipient of the Sitara e Imtiaz in 2026 in recognition of his distinguished contributions to Iqbal Studies.Dr Saif Ur-Rahman (Consultant Haemato-oncologist of Cleveland, USA and Arshad Mehmood Warraich(مرحوم) a well-known Agricultural Analyst had serves as (Agriculture Inspector) in the Agriculture Department. Another notable personality is Badee Uz Zaman Shahid, who has served in the Pakistan Atomic Energy Commission.

The Malik caste, the second largest after Warraich, is well-known across the district for buffalo trading. Advocate Malik Javed Iqbal, son of Malik Abdul Rehman, is a prominent lawyer and the first from his village to join the Supreme Court of Pakistan. Due to his legal expertise, he is well-connected with many politicians. His family has also acquired extensive land in the northwest of the village. His paternal uncle, Malik Safdar Hussain, was elected as a BD member of the Union Council, and Javed himself was elected as Naib Nazim of UC 50 in 2004.

== Mosques ==
There are almost seven mosques, Jamia, and teaching institutes for Quran and Islamic studies. The main mosque is in the eastern quarter, where Yasir Irfan is Khateeb Then there is a mosque on the northside, where Maulana Ahmed Ali and Mohammad Ali had been the khateebs. Similarly, there is a mosque on the western end of the village named Jamia Masjid Gousia Rizvizia, mainly populated by Sunni sect. There was an old mosque near the primary school, which remained abandoned for many years and it is now functioning. The mosque attached to the convent of Mian Rafi is an old one. When the refugees came from East Punjab, the majority of them was Brelvi Hanafi and they established a mosque in the west of the village in 1963 on a land donated by Haji Hameed u Din (Late). By the time, village has become more dividend in terms of religious sects as one can see many mosques in all quarters of the village.

Peoples of distance areas come there and get an education in these institutes. Maulana Mohammad Fazil (Late) shifted to that village and worked as Imam in 1945, till his death in 1997. People of the village requested him to come to Uggo Chak. He was instrumental in teaching hundreds of students and did philanthropic work. Famous scholar Dr. Yousaf Goraya was his student. Maulana Yasir Irfan, his son is now the Imam and Khateeb of his mosque.
