= Gurali (Pakistan) =

Pakistani village

- Village
- Location within Pakistan
- Coordinates: 32°31′40″N 74°05′55″E
- Country: Pakistan
- Province: Punjab
- District: Gujrat

Government

Area
  - Total: 2.92 km^{2} (1.13 sq mi)

Population
  - Estimate (2017): 3,791
- Time zone: UTC+5 (PST)
- Calling code: 053

Gurali, also known as Gorali, is a big village located in the Gujrat District of Punjab, Pakistan. The village has a government high school under the Board of Intermediate and Secondary Education, Gujranwala. Healthcare facilities include a rural dispensary and the Social Security Hospital. The Pakistan Electric Fan Manufacturers Association supports economic growth in the village. Gorali's population consists almost entirely of Muslims. Most of the people earn their living from farming or as laborers. A few people in the area work for the government. A small portion of the population have also studied abroad and migrated to various European countries. Gorali can be reached by road or train.

== See also ==
- Gujrat, Pakistan
- Gujranwala District
