= Chabba Cheema =

Village in Gujranwala, Punjab, Pakistan

- Village
- Location within Pakistan
- Coordinates: 32°18′51″N 74°00′47″E
- Country: Pakistan
- Province: Punjab
- District: Gujranwala

Area
  - Total: 2 km^{2} (0.77 sq mi)

Population
  - Estimate (2017): 1,214
- Time zone: UTC+5 (PST)
- Calling code: 055

Chabba Cheema is a small village located in Gujranwala District, of Punjab province, Pakistan. The village lies to the east of Ahmad Nagar Chattha.

For education in the village a Government Primary School is functional, by Government of Punjab, under the Board of Intermediate and Secondary Education, Gujranwala.

People go to Ahmad Nagar Chattha and Gujranwala city for higher education. Most of the population of the village is educated. Farming is the only livelihood of the people in the village, a few people are government employees. For Basic Essentials People go to Ahmad Nagar Chattha like food, education, health and electricity. The only way to get to Chabba Cheema is by Road. Chabba Cheema is connected with Ghakhar via by road. The village is quite peaceful with very low crime rate as compare to other nearby villages. Mostly the people are well off and live a quality life. People from various Jatt Clans are living in the village but the majority of the population belongs to "cheema" clan. The soil of the area is very fertile. The total area, including agricultural land, of chabba cheema is 1400 acres (estimated). The major crops cultivated are rice and wheat. But sugarcane, tobacco, potatoes, watermelon, maize and strawberry are also cultivated.

== See also ==
- Gujranwala
- Wazirabad
