= Mazhar ul Islam =

Mazhar ul Islam (Urdu: مظہرالاسلام) is a Pakistani short story writer and novelist. His short stories weave together themes of love, pain, ecstasy, separation and death.

== Early life ==
He was born on 4 August in Wazirabad in northern Punjab where his father had then been posted by the Forestry Department. After his father's death in 1967, he moved to Islamabad.

== Career ==
Mazhar ul Islam served as Director General of the Pakistan Academy of Letters, as executive director of Lok Virsa and the managing director of the National Book Foundation. He has been awarded the President's Pride of Performance for Literature and a medal for Revival of Folk Studies.

== Publications ==
- Mohabbat Murda Pholon ki Symphany
- La stagione dell’amore, delle mandorle amare e delle piogge tarde (Italian translation)
- Mein, aap aur who (You, him and I)
- Baton ki barish mein bhegti larki (A girl showering in the rain of words)
- Khat mein post ki huee dopeher (An afternoon posted in a letter)
- The season of love, bitter almonds and delayed rains
- Ghoron ke sheher mein akela aadmi (A lonely man in the city of horses)
- Gurrya ki aankh se sheher ko dekho (Look at the city with the eye of a doll)
- Ay Khuda (O God)
