= Wazirabad Tehsil =

Wazirabad Tehsil تحصيل وزير آباد city of cutlery
- Tehsil
- Tehsil Municipal Administration logo
- Country: Pakistan
- Region: Punjab
- District: Wazirabad
- Headquarters: Wazirabad

Area
  - Tehsil: 1,206 km^{2} (466 sq mi)

Population (2017)
  - Tehsil: 830,396
  - Density: 688.5/km^{2} (1,783/sq mi)
  - Urban: 299,751
  - Rural: 530,645
- Time zone: UTC+5 (PST)
  - Summer (DST): UTC+6 (PDT)

Wazirabad Tehsil (Urdu: تحصِيل وزِيرآباد), is an administrative subdivision (tehsil) of Wazirabad District in the Punjab province of Pakistan. The tehsil is headquartered at the city of Wazirabad and is administratively subdivided into 36 Union Councils.

== History ==
During colonial rule the tehsil was part of the Gujranwala District of British Punjab. According to the 1901 census, the population was 183,205, a slight decrease from the 1891 census (183,606). According to the 1901 census, the main towns were Wazirabad (population, 18,069), Ramnagar (7,121), Sodhra (5,050), and Akalgarh (4,961). The tehsil also contained 254 villages. The land revenue and cesses in 1903-04 amounted to Rs. 270,000.

The Imperial Gazetteer of India (written over a century ago during the rule of the British) describes the tehsil as follows: "The tahsīl consists of a riverain belt along with the Chenab rich and highly developed tract along the Siālkot border, with abundant well-irrigation; and the level uplands known as the Bāngar. The head-works of the Chenāb Canal are at Khānkī in this tahsīl."

Wazirabad villages

- Jugna Chattha (village of chiefs)
- Meraj K Chattha
- Adal Garh
- Aujla Kalan
- Ahmadnagar Chattha
- Banka Cheema
- Bagrian Kohna
- Bharoke Cheema
- Bhatti Ke
- Bhatti Mansoor
- Bhoma Bath
- Chandhar
- Chak Baig
- Chak Dadan
- Chak Gillan
- Dilawar Cheema
- Dharowal Kang
- Dhaunkal
- Douburji Virkan
- Gill Wala
- Gunian wala
- Ghakka Mitter
- Hairanwala Kalan
- Dhala chaatah
- DadWali Sharif
- Dhilam
- Hardo Warpal
- Hazrat Kalianwala
- Jamke Chattha
- Jaura
- Jhatan Wali
- Kaka Kolo
- kalaske
- Kot Bangash
- Kot Inayat Khan
- Kot Jahangir
- Kot khizri
- Kot Qadir Bakhsh
- Kot Shah Muhammad
- Kot Yusuf
- Ladhewala Cheema
- Mansoor Wali
- Mardeke
- Mohlunke
- Pathanke cheema
- Nat Kalan
- Noian Wala
- Nokhar
- Qila Didar Singh
- Qila Mihan Singh
- Rasool Nagar
- Sodhra
- Saroke
- Verpal Chattha
- Wanjo Wali
- Wazirabad
