= Siddheshwar Mitter =

Indian civil servant (1895–1912)

Siddheswar Mitter
- Born: 1865; Calcutta
- Died: 1912 (aged 47); Calcutta
- Occupations: Civilian, diplomat

Rai Bahadur Siddheshwar Mitter was a civil servant in British India.

== Background ==
He was born in Hooghly-Konnagar in the province of Bengal. He was closely related to Brajendranath De

== Career ==
He was a civilian employed in the Indian Foreign Department. In the initial years of his career, he worked as Sir Francis Younghusband's Confidential Assistant in Lhasa. He did useful work in Nepal and Indore as well. Later, he was appointed by Colonel Daly, the Agent of the Governor-General in Central India, as Dewan of Chhatarpur State, a Rajput State in Central India. For the services he rendered to the British and the Indian States, he received the decoration of Rai Bahadur.
