= Iftikhar Nagar Cheema =

- Village
- Iftikhar Nagar Cheema

Iftikhar Nagar Cheema is a small village located in Gujranwala district in the region of Pakistan's Punjab. It is part of Kamoke Tehsil.
