= Mohlunke =

Village in Wazirabad Tehsil

Mohlunke موہلن کے
- Village
- Location of Mohlunke Mohlunke (Pakistan)
- Coordinates: 32°27′6″N 73°9′53″E
- Country: Pakistan
- Province: Punjab
- District: Gujranwala
- Tehsil: Wazirabad

Area
  - Total: 0.80 sq mi (2.08 km^{2})

Population
  - Estimate (2017): 3,587
- Time zone: UTC+05:00 (Pakistan Standard Time)
- Postal code type: 52070
- Calling code: 055

Mohlunke (Urdu: موہلن کے) is a village in Wazirabad Tehsil, Gujranwala District, Punjab, Pakistan.

== Education ==
- Government Boys Primary School Mohlanke
- Government Girls Primary School Mohlanke

== See also ==
- Gujranwala
- Ahmad Nagar
