= Jaura Singha =

Coordinates: 31°53′N 75°12′E

Jaura Sangha
- Village
- Interactive map of Jaura Sangha
- Country: India
- State: Punjab
- District: Gurdaspur
- Tehsil: Batala
- Region: Majha

Government
  - Type: Panchayat raj
  - Body: Gram panchayat

Area
  - Total: 382 ha (940 acres)

Population (2011)
  - Total: 2,126; 1,143/983 ♂/♀
  - Scheduled Castes: 681; 377/304 ♂/♀
  - Total Households: 395

Languages
  - Official: Punjabi
- Time zone: UTC+5:30 (IST)
- Telephone: 01871
- ISO 3166 code: IN-PB
- Vehicle registration: PB-18
- Website: gurdaspur.nic.in

Jaura Singha is a village in Batala in Gurdaspur district of Punjab State, India. It is located 9 kilometres (5.6 mi) from sub district headquarter, 47 kilometres (29 mi) from district headquarter and 40 kilometres (25 mi) from Sri Hargobindpur. The village is administrated by Sarpanch an elected representative of the village.

== Demography ==
As of 2011, the village has a total number of 395 houses and a population of 2126 of which 1143 are males while 983 are females. According to the report published by Census India in 2011, out of the total population of the village 681 people are from Schedule Caste and the village does not have any Schedule Tribe population so far.

== See also ==
- List of villages in India
