= Sulakhan Singh Puar =

Sardar Sulakhan Singh Puar was a 19th-century ruler and a general of Dal Khalsa under Sukerchakia confederacy during the reign of Ranjit Singh. He inherited the command of Sodhra fort from his father Sardar Daan Singh Puar under Sukerchakia confederacy.
