= Wazirabad =

City in Punjab, Pakistan

Wazirabad وزیر آباد
- City
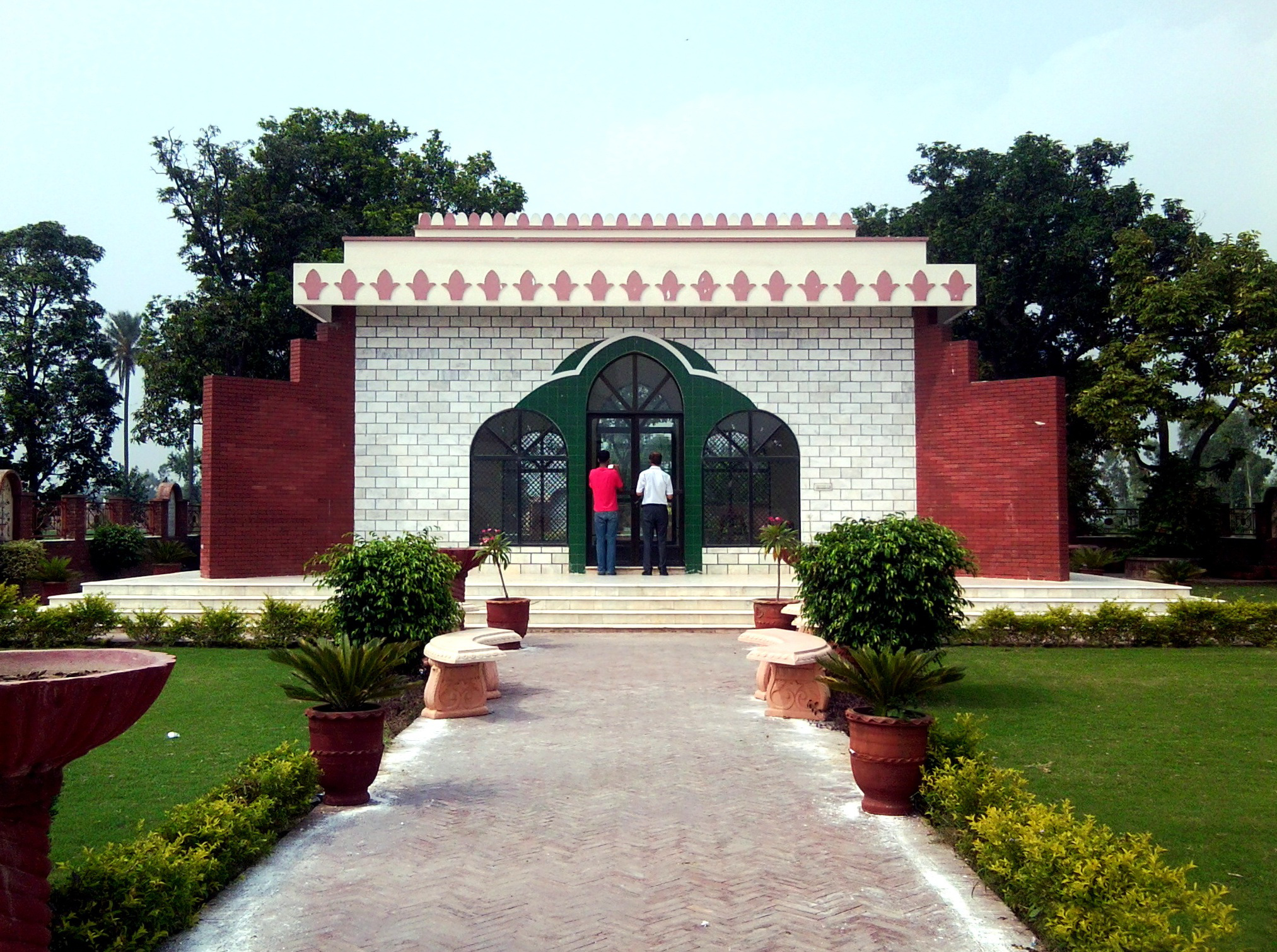
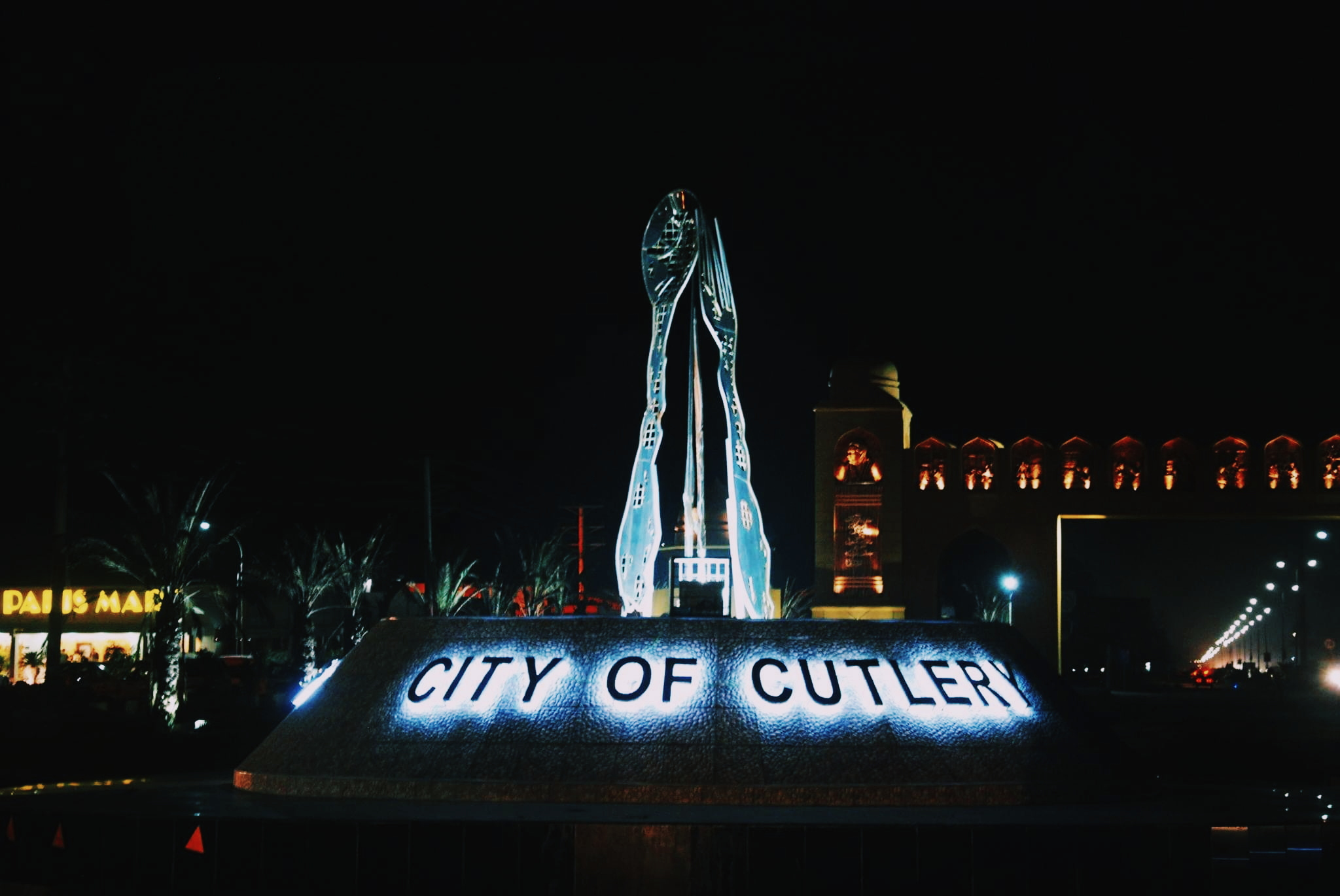
- Tomb of Maulana Zafar Ali Khan Gateway to Wazirabad

- Location of Wazirabad Wazirabad (Pakistan)
- Coordinates: 32°26′7″N 74°6′51″E
- Country: Pakistan
- Province: (Punjab, Pakistan) Punjab
- Division: Gujrat
- District: Wazirabad
- Tehsil: Wazirabad and Ali Pur Chattha
- No. of Union Councils: 12
- Municipal status: 1867

Government
  - Type: Municipal Corporation
  - Mayor: Vacant
  - Deputy Mayor: Vacant

Area
  - City: 83 km^{2} (32 sq mi)
  - Metro: 1,206 km^{2} (466 sq mi)
- Elevation: 215 m (705 ft)

Population (2023 Census of Pakistan)
  - City: 152,624
  - Rank: 75th in Pakistan
  - Density: 1,800/km^{2} (4,800/sq mi)
- Demonym: Wazirabadi
- Time zone: UTC+5 (PST)
  - Summer (DST): UTC+6 (PDT)
- Postal code: 52000

Wazirabad (Urdu and Punjabi: وزیر آباد) is a city in Punjab, Pakistan. It is the administrative capital of Wazirabad District and Wazirabad Tehsil. Famous for its cutlery products, it is known as the city of cutlery and is also known for its cuisine. Wazirabad is situated on the banks of the Chenab River, nearly 100 kilometres north of Lahore on the Grand Trunk Road. It is 45 kilometres from Sialkot, 30 kilometres from Gujranwala, and about 12 kilometres from Gujrat.

== Administration ==
The city of Wazirabad is subdivided into 12 Union Councils. Prior to 2023, Wazirabad was the headquarters of Wazirabad Tehsil and an administrative subdivision of Gujranwala District. In 2023 Wazirabad Tehsil was elevated to Wazirabad District which was then subdivided into tehsils.

== History ==
The city was founded in the 17th century by Shaikh Ilam-ud-Din Chinioti, better known by his title Wazir Khan, who was the governor of Punjab during the reign of Mughal emperor Shah Jahan. The town was taken over by Charat Singh around 1760, together with other towns in the district. Maharaja Ranjit Singh occupied the town in 1809, and Paolo Avitabile was appointed as the Nazim of the city. He built an entirely new town, with a straight, broad bazaar running through it and side streets at right angles.

=== British rule ===
During British period, Wazirabad was the headquarters of the old Wazirabad District, broken up in 1851–2, and was the site of a military cantonment moved to Sialkot in 1855.

The municipality was created in 1867; the population, according to the 1901 census, was 18,069. The annual income during the ten years ending 1902-3 averaged Rs. 20,800, and the expenditure Rs. 21,400. In 1903–04, the income was Rs. 20,800, chiefly from octroi, and the expenditure was Rs. 19,200. The town had a considerable trade in timber, which comes down the Chenab from Jammu territory. The smiths of Wazirabad had a reputation for the manufacture of small articles of cutlery, and the town of Nizamabad within a mile of the town is famed for its weapons. Wazirabad was an important junction on the North-Western Railway, as the Sialkot-Jammu and Lyallpur lines both branch off of here.

The Chenab river is spanned opposite Wazirabad by the Alexandra railway bridge, one of the finest engineering works of the kind in British India, which was opened in 1876 by Edward VII when he was the Prince of Wales. The town possessed two Anglo-Vernacular high schools, one maintained by the Church of Scotland Mission, and a government dispensary.

== Demographics ==
Population

Historical population
Year	Pop.	±% p.a.
1951	33,027	—
1961	29,399	−1.16%
1972	40,063	+2.85%
1981	62,725	+5.11%
1998	90,197	+2.16%
2017	128,060	+1.86%
2023	152,624	+2.97%

According to the 2023 census, Wazirabad has a population of 152,624.

Languages

Languages of Wazirabad MC (2023 Census)
1. Punjabi (86.2%)
2. Urdu (12.5%)
3. Pashto (0.90%)
4. Other (0.40%)

=== Health ===
The city contains a Family Welfare Centre which is part of Pakistan’s population welfare program.

== Notable residents ==
- Abdul Mannan Wazirabadi, Islamic scholar
- Fazal Ilahi Wazirabadi, Islamic scholar and freedom fighter
- Hamid Nasir Chattha, former Speaker of the National Assembly of Pakistan
- Iftikhar Cheema, retired judge and Member National Assembly for 3 tenures
- Nisar Ahmed Cheema, Ex-DG Health Punjab and Member National Assembly
- Jawwad S. Khawaja, 23rd Chief Justice of Pakistan
- Atif Aslam, singer
- S. A. Rahman, fifth Chief Justice of Pakistan
- Shaikh Nazrul Bakar, civil servant
- Noon Meem Rashid, progressive poet
- Munnu Bhai, writer
- Razia Butt, writer
- Krishan Chander, writer
- Maulana Zafar Ali Khan, writer, poet, and journalist
- Mohammad Abdul Ghafoor Hazarvi, Muslim theologian, orator and revivalist leader
- Mazhar ul Islam, writer
- Raja Mehdi Ali Khan, film songs lyricist
- Allah Bakhsh, painter, artist
- Shaukat Manzoor Cheema, politician
