= Gujranwala District =

Gujranwala district ضِلع گجرانوالہ (Punjabi) ضلع گوجرانوالہ (Urdu)
- District
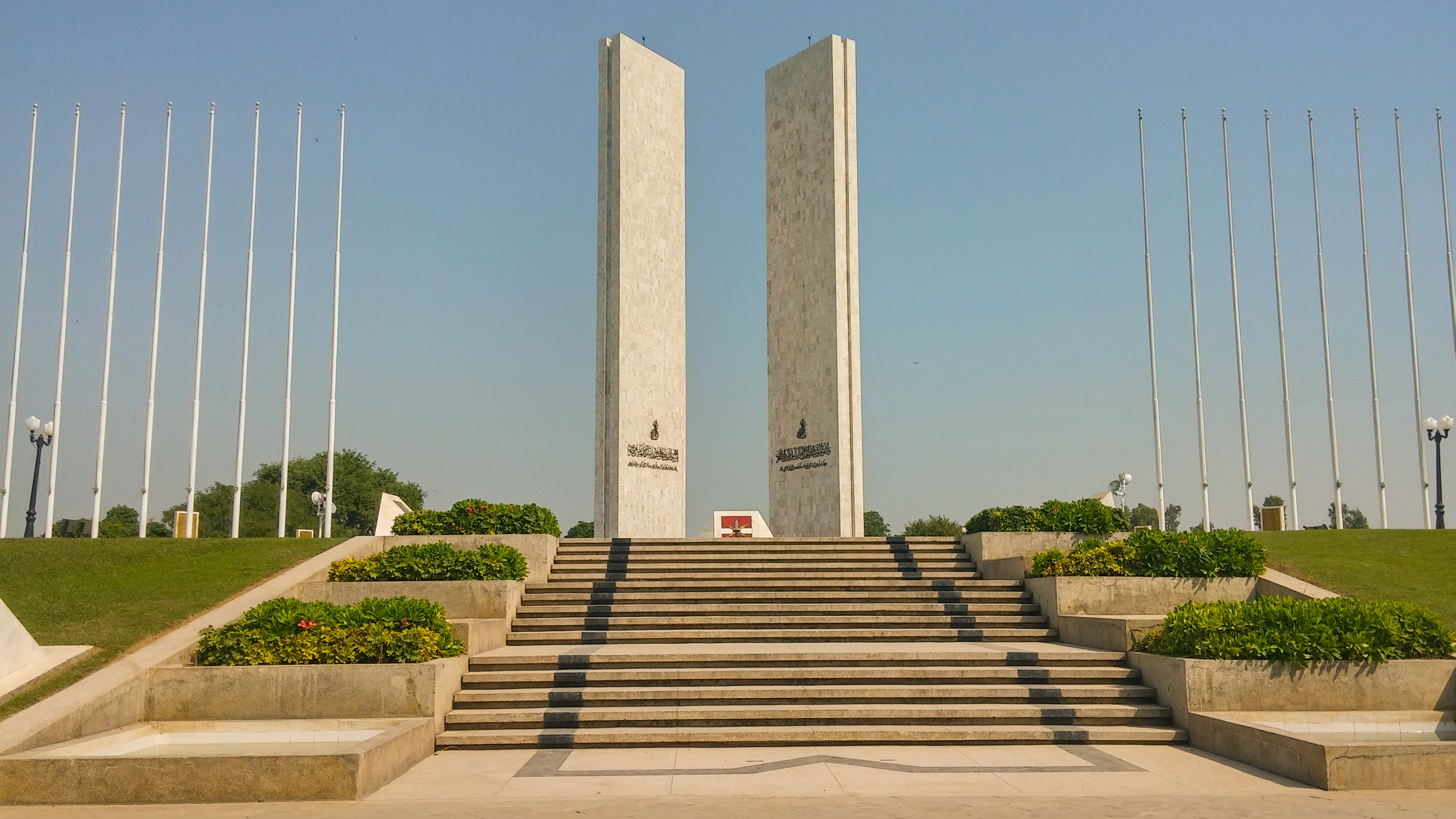
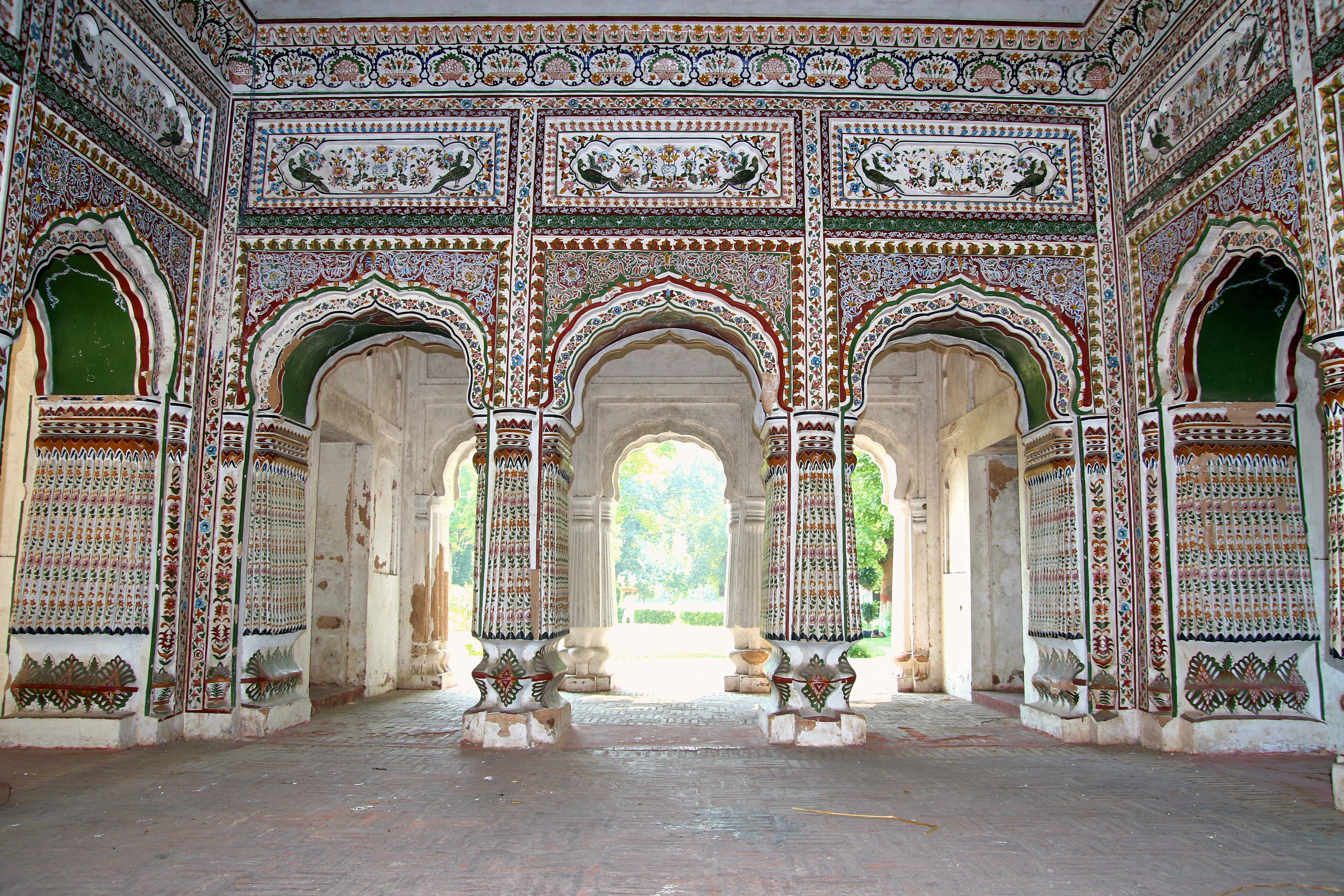
- Top: Nishan-e-Manzil; Bottom: Baraari in Sheranwala Garden

- Map of Punjab with Gujranwala District highlighted
- Coordinates: 32°10′N 73°50′E
- Country: Pakistan
- Province: Punjab
- Division: Gujranwala
- Established: 1852; 174 years ago
- Founder: British Raj
- Headquarters: Gujranwala
- Administrative Subdivisions: 04: Gujranwala City Tehsil Gujranwala Saddar Tehsil Kamoke Tehsil Nowshera Virkan Tehsil

Government
  - Type: District Administration
  - CPO: Gayas Gul khan
  - Deputy Commissioner: Naveed Ahamd

Area
  - District: 2,426 km^{2} (937 sq mi)

Population (2023)
  - District: 4,966,338
  - Rank: 7th, Punjab; 7th, Pakistan
  - Density: 2,047/km^{2} (5,302/sq mi)
  - Urban: 3,224,962 (64.94%)
  - Rural: 1,741,376 (35.06%)

Literacy
  - Literacy rate: Total: (76.65%); Male: (77.94%); Female: (75.31%)
- Time zone: UTC+5 (PKT)
- Postal code: 52200
- Area code: 055
- Number of Tehsils: 4
- Languages: Punjabi (predominant, native); Urdu (minority)
- Website: gujranwala.punjab.gov.pk

Gujranwala District (Note: Punjabi: ضِلع گجرانوالہ; Urdu: ضِلع گوجرانوالہ, romanized: Zilā Gojrā̃vālā) is a district within the Gujranwala Division of Punjab, Pakistan. It is bordered by the districts of Wazirabad, Sialkot, Hafizabad and Sheikhupura. Gujranwala district has 5 National Assembly and 12 Punjab Assembly constituencies.

== History ==
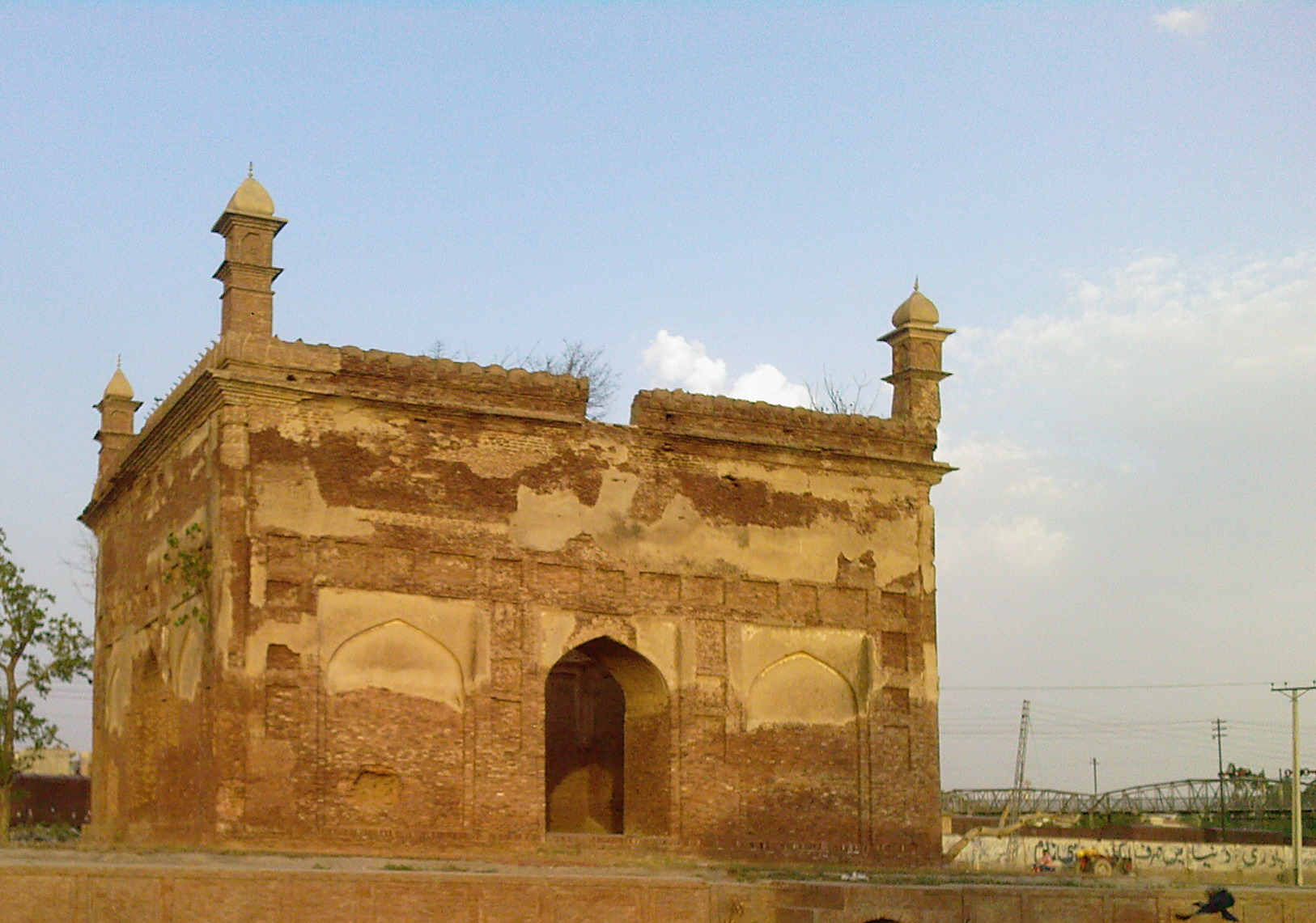
Dak Chowki(mail station) of Sher Shah Suri's period (built in 1542), Wazirabad

Gujranwala belongs to the Majha region of ancient Punjab. The village of Asarur has been identified as the location of Taki, an ancient town, visited by the Chinese pilgrim Hiuen Tsiang contains immense ruins of Buddhist origin. After the time of Tsiang little is known about Gujranwala till the Islamic conquests by Mahmud of Ghazni, by this time, however, Taki had fallen into oblivion while Lahore had become the capital of Punjab. Lahore had replaced Taki as the major city of Punjab and it became the second capital of the Ghaznavids. The contemporary village of Asarur has been identified as the site of the ancient city. From the beginning of the 7th century Gujjar kingdoms dominated Eastern portions of Pakistan and northern India. The district flourished during Mughal rule, from the days of Akbar to those of Aurangzeb, wells were scattered over the whole country, and villages lay thickly dotted about the southern plateau, now a barren waste of grass land and scrub jungle. Their remains may still be found in the wildest and most solitary reaches of the Bar. The Punjab region became predominantly Muslim due to missionary Sufi saints whose dargahs dot the landscape of Punjab region.

Eminabad and Hafizabad were the chief towns (the latter now part of a separate district), while the country was divided into six well-tilled parganas. But before the end of the Islamic period the tract was mysteriously depopulated. The tribes at present occupying the District are all immigrants of recent date, and before their advent the whole region seems for a time to have been almost entirely abandoned. The only plausible conjecture to account for this sudden and disastrous change is that it resulted from the constant wars by which the Punjab was convulsed during the last years of Mughal Imperial rule.

After the decline of the Mughal Empire following Aurangzeb's death in 1707, the Afsharids in 1739 under their powerful Turko-Iranian conqueror Nadir Shah destroyed what remained of the once powerful Mughal Empire. Between 1747 and 1772 the Durrani Afghans of Ahmad Shah Abdali and the Sikh Misls vied for control of the region following the power vacuum left by the Mughals. The area was under the control of the Durrani Empire for a short period of time. Eventually the Sikh Sukerchakia Misl of Charat Singh won out and occupied the area of Gujranwala making it his new capital.

=== Chattha State (1750 - 1797) ===
The Chatthas under their leader Nur Muhammad Chattha declared independence from Mughal Empire in 1750 and formed the Chattha State. After Pir Muhammad Chattha's death his son Ghulam Muhammad Chattha inherited the Chattha state and the hatred of Sukerchakias. The rivalry was passed down to Mahan Singh and Ghulam Muhammad Chattha.

Under his leadership the Chathas gained several successes over the Sikhs, and it at one time looked as if the progress of the Sikh arms had been arrested and their dominion in the Doab annihilated.

Chattha State was annexed when Jan Muhammad Chattha was killed in a siege led by Ranjit Singh when the latter recovered the lost Chattha state with Afghan aid.

Bhattis (Rajputs) maintained a sturdy independence. In the end, however, the Sukerchakia misl succeeded in bringing them under its power. Maha Singh's son Ranjit Singh, founder of the Sikh Empire, was born in Gujranwala. Gujranwala was the capital of the Sukerchakia Misl hence many important personalities of the Sikh Empire were born here such as Ranjit Singh and his most famous general Hari Singh Nalwa.

In 1849, the district was occupied by the British East India Company who annexed the entirety of the Sikh Empire after defeating them in the Second Anglo-Sikh War. The Dogra dynasty collaborated with the British and helped them in bringing down the Sikh Empire. A cantonment was established at Wazirabad, which was abolished in 1855. The District formed a part originally of the extensive District of Wazirabad, which comprised the whole upper portion of the Rechna Doab.

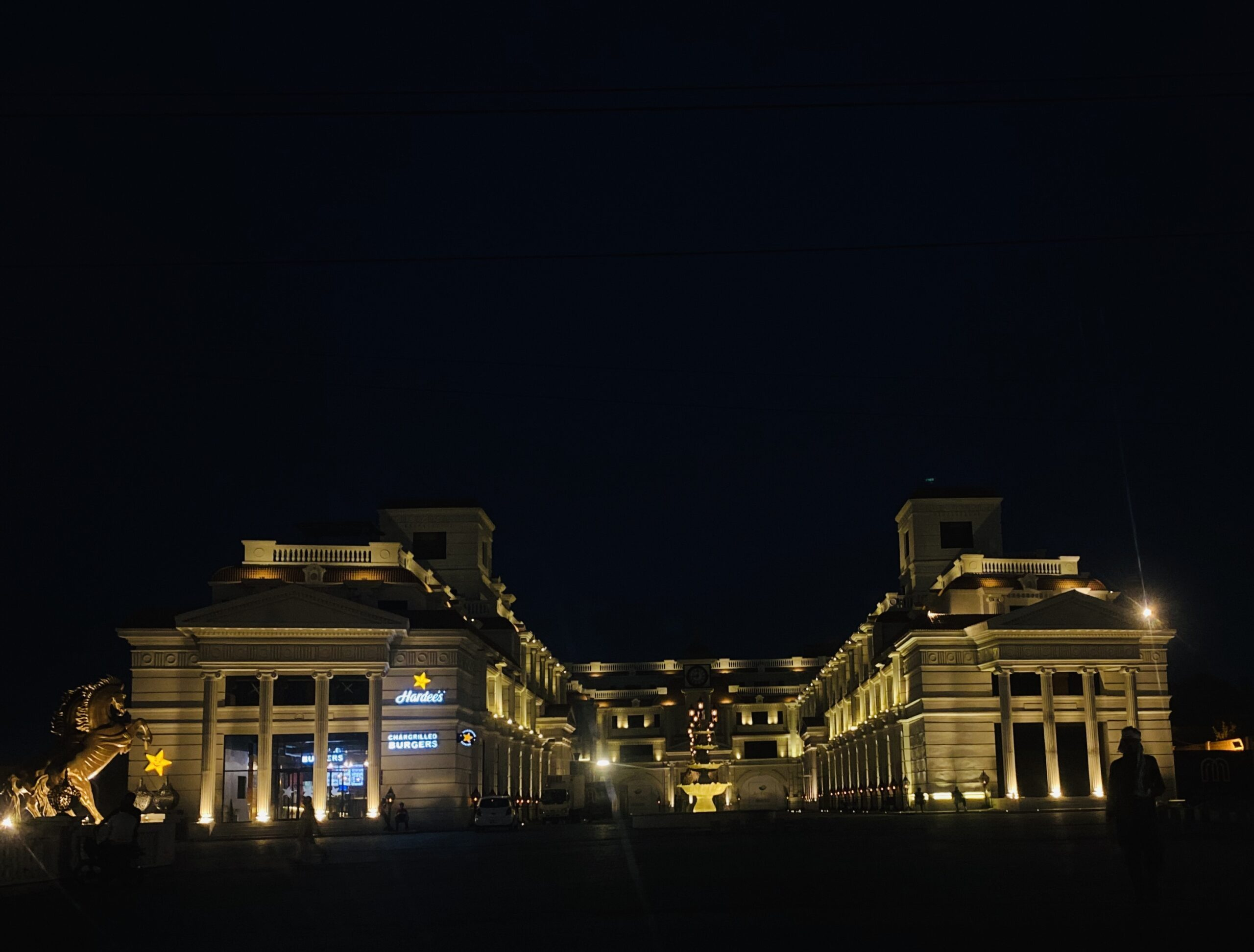
Mall of Gujranwala

In 1852 this unwieldy territory was divided between Gujranwala and Sialkot District. The District, as then constituted, stretched across the entire plateau, from the Chenab to the Ravi; but in 1853 the south-eastern fringe, consisting of 303 villages, was transferred to Lahore District, and three years later a second batch of 324 villages was handed over to the same District. There was no outbreak during the Indian Rebellion of 1857 and the Hindus and Sikh rallied to the side of Government with the greatest enthusiasm while Muslims rallied for the Mughals. According to the 1901 census the District had a population of 890,577 and contained 8 towns and 1,331 villages. Its population according to the 1881 census was 616,892 rising to 690,169 in 1891. The population increased by 29 per cent between 1891 and 1901 - the increase being greatest in the Hafizabad and Khangah Dogran tahsils, owing to the extension of canal-irrigation and the colonisation of the Bar. At the time the district was divided into four tehsils, namely: Gujranwala, Wazirabad, Hafizabad and Khangah Dogran (the headquarters of each being at the place from which it is named). The chief towns during British rule were the municipalities of Gujranwala, the headquarters of the District, Wazirabad, Rasulnagar, Ali Pur Chattha, Eminabad, Qila Didar Singh, and the notified area of Sodhra. During the British era, the district of Gujranwala was part of Lahore Division.

== Demographics ==
=== Population ===
Historical population
Year	Pop.	±% p.a.
1951	360,982	—
1961	490,678	+3.12%
1972	874,948	+5.40%
1981	1,223,379	+3.79%
1998	2,112,474	+3.27%
2017	4,180,670	+3.66%
2023	4,966,338	+2.91%
Sources: District was bifurcated in 2022

As of the 2023 census, the residual Gujranwala district has 706,796 households and a population of 4,966,338. The district has a sex ratio of 103.96 males to 100 females and a literacy rate of 76.65%: 77.94% for males and 75.31% for females. 1,322,407 (26.73% of the surveyed population) are under 10 years of age. 3,224,962 (64.95%) live in urban areas.

=== Religion ===
Religion in Gujranwala district 2023
Religion	Percent
Islam	96.40%
Christianity	3.49%
Other or not stated	0.11%

Religion in contemporary Gujranwala District
Religious group	1941		2017		2023	
Religious group	Pop.	%	Pop.	%	Pop.	%
Islam	285,845	61.31%	4,024,927	96.27%	4,768,730	96.40%
Sikhism	76,035	16.31%	—N/a	—N/a	134	~0%
Hinduism (Note: 1931-1941: Including Ad-Dharmis)	58,343	12.51%	255	0.01%	916	0.02%
Christianity	44,596	9.56%	150,943	3.61%	172,863	3.49%
Ahmadi	—N/a	—N/a	4,432	0.11%	3,892	0.08%
Others	1,429	0.31%	237	~0%	226	0.01%
Total Population	466,248	100%	4,180,794	100%	4,946,761	100%
Note: 1941 census data is for Gujranwala tehsil of erstwhile Gujranwala district, which roughly corresponds to contemporary Gujranwala district. District and tehsil borders have changed since 1941.

Religious groups in Gujranwala District (British Punjab province era)
Religious group	1881		1891		1901		1911		1921		1931		1941	
Religious group	Pop.	%	Pop.	%	Pop.	%	Pop.	%	Pop.	%	Pop.	%	Pop.	%
Islam	452,640	73.37%	475,494	68.9%	531,908	70.28%	622,430	67.4%	443,147	71.06%	521,343	70.82%	642,706	70.45%
Hinduism	127,322	20.64%	166,278	24.09%	169,594	22.41%	176,075	19.07%	101,566	16.29%	92,764	12.6%	108,115	11.85%
Sikhism	36,159	5.86%	45,316	6.57%	51,607	6.82%	107,748	11.67%	50,802	8.15%	71,595	9.73%	99,139	10.87%
Jainism	577	0.09%	727	0.11%	932	0.12%	950	0.1%	754	0.12%	1,071	0.15%	1,445	0.16%
Christianity	194	0.03%	2,353	0.34%	2,748	0.36%	16,215	1.76%	27,308	4.38%	49,364	6.71%	60,829	6.67%
Zoroastrianism	0	0%	0	0%	0	0%	1	0%	4	0%	0	0%	0	0%
Buddhism	0	0%	0	0%	0	0%	0	0%	0	0%	1	0%	0	0%
Judaism	—N/a	—N/a	0	0%	8	0%	0	0%	0	0%	0	0%	0	0%
Others	0	0%	1	0%	0	0%	0	0%	0	0%	0	0%	0	0%
Total population	616,892	100%	690,169	100%	756,797	100%	923,419	100%	623,581	100%	736,138	100%	912,234	100%
Note1: British Punjab province era district borders are not an exact match in the present-day due to various bifurcations to district borders — which since created new districts — throughout the historic Punjab Province region during the post-independence era that have taken into account population increases. Note2: Population decrease between 1911 and 1921 census due to the creation of Sheikhupura District, as a result of the large population increase in the region, primarily due to the Chenab Canal Colony.

Religion in the Tehsils of Gujranwala District (1921)
Tehsil	Islam		Hinduism		Sikhism		Christianity		Jainism		Others (Note: Including Buddhism, Zoroastrianism, Judaism, Tribals, others, or not stated)		Total	
Tehsil	Pop.	%	Pop.	%	Pop.	%	Pop.	%	Pop.	%	Pop.	%	Pop.	%
Gujranwala Tehsil	181,657	61.67%	53,392	18.13%	38,299	13%	20,496	6.96%	723	0.25%	0	0%	294,567	100%
Wazirabad Tehsil	109,652	74.98%	23,699	16.2%	6,893	4.71%	5,973	4.08%	27	0.02%	4	0%	146,248	100%
Hafizabad Tehsil	151,838	83.08%	24,475	13.39%	5,610	3.07%	839	0.46%	4	0%	0	0%	182,766	100%
Note: British Punjab province era tehsil borders are not an exact match in the present-day due to various bifurcations to tehsil borders — which since created new tehsils — throughout the historic Punjab Province region during the post-independence era that have taken into account population increases.

Religion in the Tehsils of Gujranwala District (1941)
Tehsil	Islam		Hinduism		Sikhism		Christianity		Jainism		Others (Note: Including Anglo-Indian Christians, British Christians, Buddhism, Zoroastrianism, Judaism, Tribals, others, or not stated)		Total	
Tehsil	Pop.	%	Pop.	%	Pop.	%	Pop.	%	Pop.	%	Pop.	%	Pop.	%
Gujranwala Tehsil	285,845	61.31%	58,343	12.51%	76,035	16.31%	44,596	9.56%	1,411	0.3%	18	0%	466,248	100%
Wazirabad Tehsil	157,961	76.7%	22,451	10.9%	13,543	6.58%	11,829	5.74%	18	0.01%	150	0.07%	205,952	100%
Hafizabad Tehsil	198,900	82.86%	27,321	11.38%	9,561	3.98%	3,955	1.65%	16	0.01%	281	0.12%	240,034	100%
Note1: British Punjab province era tehsil borders are not an exact match in the present-day due to various bifurcations to tehsil borders — which since created new tehsils — throughout the historic Punjab Province region during the post-independence era that have taken into account population increases. Note2: Tehsil religious breakdown figures for Christianity only includes local Christians, labeled as "Indian Christians" on census. Does not include Anglo-Indian Christians or British Christians, who were classified under "Other" category.

=== Language ===
Languages of Gujranwala district (2023)
1. Punjabi (91.6%)
2. Urdu (6.48%)
3. Others (1.91%)

At the time of the 2023 census, 91.61% of the population in the residual district spoke Punjabi and 6.48% Urdu as their first language.

=== Tribes and castes ===
As per the 2020 gazetteer of Gujranwala District, the distribution in terms of tribes and castes are the following:

Tribe/caste	Presence
Jat	20%
Rajput	15%
Arain	15%
Gujjar	25%
Shaikh	5%
Mughal	5%
Kashmiri	5%
Minorities	3%
Others	7%

== Administration ==
Gujranwala is in fact a City district. The district is divided into the following tehsils:

- Gujranwala City
- Gujranwala Saddar
- Kamoke
- Nowshera Virkan

Furthermore, there are the following towns under these tehsils:

- Khiali Shahpure Town
- Aroop Town
- Nandipur Town
- Qila Didar Singh Town
- Kamoke Town
- Naushehra Virkan Town

The first four towns lie in Gujranwala City and Saddar tehsils while the last two towns are under their respective tehsils, i.e. Tehsil Kamoke and Naushehra Virkan respectively.

Gujranwala is the district headquarters while Gujranwala, Kamoke and Naushehra Virkan are tehsil headquarters.

#	Tehsil	Area (km^{2})	Pop. (2023)	Density (ppl/km^{2}) (2023)	Lit. rate (2023)	Union Councils
1	Gujranwala City	131	2,511,118	19,168.84	79.39%	
2	Gujranwala Saddar	783	1,133,101	1,447.13	75.71%	
3	Kamoke	834	681,339	816.95	73.04%	
4	Nowshera Virkan	678	640,780	945.10	71.36%	

== Colleges and Universities ==
- University of the Punjab, Gujranwala Campus, bypass road Near Shalimar Town, Gujranwala
- Saint Mary's Institute of Nursing, Pharmacy, and Allied Health Sciences
- University of Health Sciences, Gujranwala Medical College, Ali Pure Chatha Road, Gujranwala
- Pakistan Atomic Energy Commission, Gujranwala Inst. of Nuclear Medicine, Sialkot Road, Nizampure, Gujranwala
- Allama Iqbal Open University, Regional Campus Gujranwala
- Virtual University of Pakistan, Gujranwala Campus, GT Road Gujranwala
- Pakistan Military Aviation Training School, Link Air Base Road off Main Shahra-e-Qauid-e-Azam, Cantt. Gujranwala
- GIFT University, Sialkot By-pass Road near Garden Town, Gujranwala
- (SM College), Gujranwala
- Saint Mary's College of Medical & Advance Studies
- Government of Commerce People's Colony Gujranwala
- Govt. College, Satellite Town, Gujranwala
- Govt. Post Graduate College for Girls, Satellite Town, Gujranwala
- Govt. Post Graduate College for Girls, Model Town, Gujranwala
- Govt. Islamia Post Graduate College, Islamia College Road, Gujranwala
- Govt. College for Girls, Islamia College Road, Gujranwala
- Govt. College for Girls, Niyaean Chowk, Urdu Bazar, Gujranwala
- Govt. Post Graduate College for Girls, Model Town, Gujranwala
- Govt. Degree College, People's Colony, Gujranwala
- Govt. College for Girls, People's Colony, Gujranwala
- Federal Govt. College, Cantt., Gujranwala
- Federal Govt. College for Girls, Cantt., Gujranwala
- Govt. College for Girls, Cantt., Gujranwala
- Chenab College Of Engineering And Technology Gujranwala
- GOVT College Of Commerce Nowshera road
- GOVT College Of Commerce for Girls, Civil Lines, Gujranwala
- GOVT College Of Technology, GT road Gujranwala
- GOVT Leather Tech. Instt. GT road Gujranwala
- GOVT tech, training Inst. Pasrur road Gujranwala
- GOVT Vocational training Instt. for Girls, Cantt. Gujranwala
- Sanat Zaar, Jinnah Road Gujranwala
- Saint Mary's Law College
- University of Central Punjab, Gujranwala Campus, Sialkot bypass road Gujranwala
- Chenab College Of Engineering And Technology Gujranwala
- Punjab Group of Colleges

== Transport links ==
In December 2025 it was announced that a mass transit system for the district, allowing easier travel for commuters, workers and students across the district.

=== Rail ===
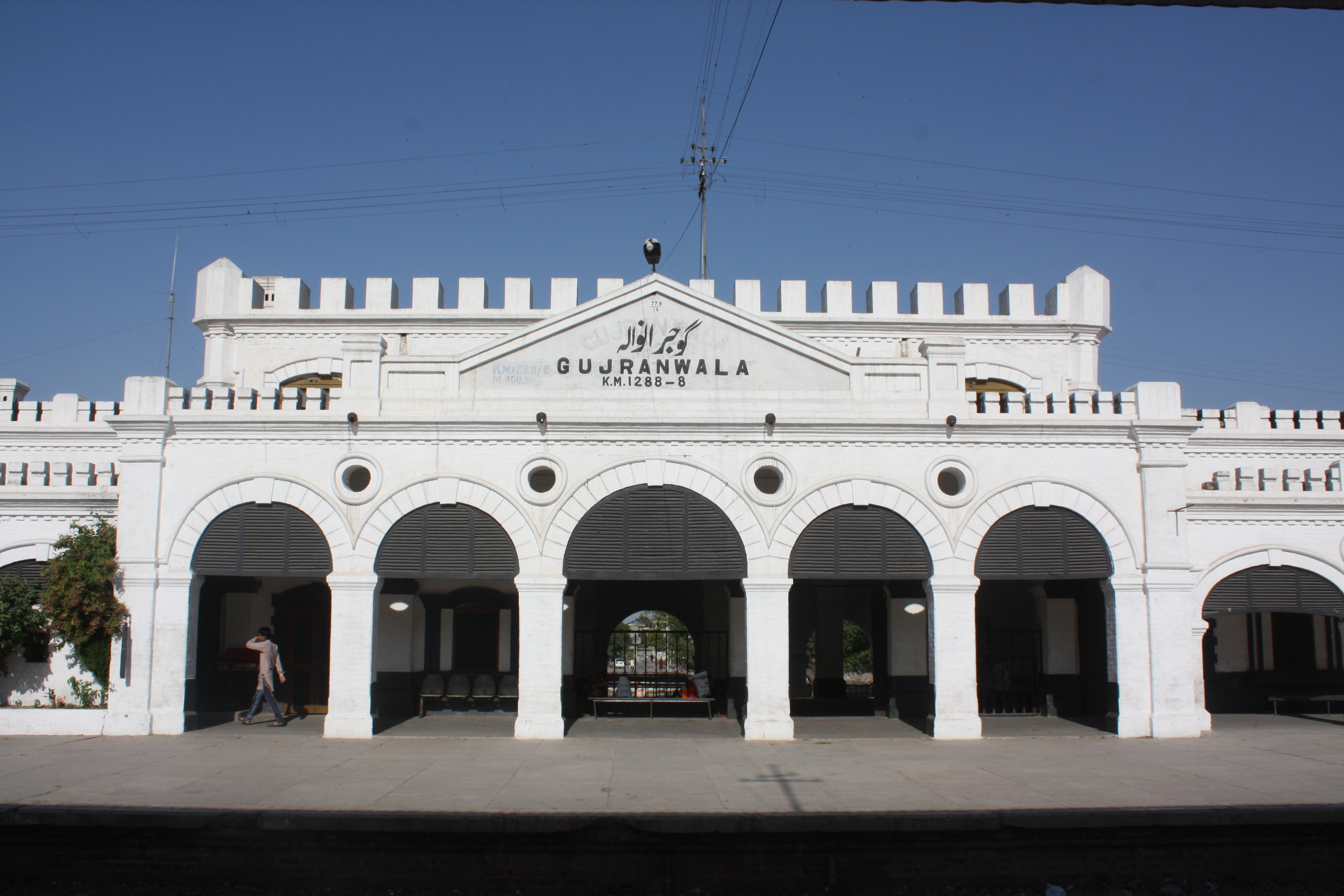
Gujranwala railway station

The main Peshawar-Karachi railway line passes through Gujranwala district. The district is linked with Sialkot, Hafizabad and Gujrat districts through railway network.

== Economy ==
The district of Gujranwala outperformed other districts of Punjab between April and June 2025 according to the Government of Punjab's Key Performance Indicators. Gujranwala is largest manufacturer of sanitary fittings, textiles, plastic furniture, pots, room coolers and heaters, gas stove and agricultural tools and equipment. Pakistan's top quality Basmati rice is grown in this region.

== Notable people ==
- Kasturi Lal Chopra, an Indian materials physicist and a former director of the Indian Institute of Technology, Kharagpur
- Ram Nath Chopra, an Indian Medical Service officer, considered the "Father of Indian Pharmacology"
- Amrita Pritam, a Punjabi novelist, essayist and poet
- Kripa Sagar, a Punjabi poet and an important figure of Punjabi literature in the late nineteenth century.
- Shaista Nuzhat, a Punjabi poet, linguist and researcher in Punjabi language.
- Luqman Butt, cricketer for Cambodia

== See also ==
- Gujranwala
- Gujranwala Division
- Gujranwala Medical College
- Gujranwala railway station
- Districts of Pakistan
- Punjab, Pakistan
- Karachi–Peshawar Line
- Gujranwala Electric Power Company
- Jinnah Stadium, Gujranwala
- Gurjar
- Uggu Chak
- Districts of Pakistan
  - Districts of Punjab, Pakistan
  - Districts of Sindh
  - Districts of Balochistan, Pakistan
  - Districts of Khyber Pakhtunkhwa
  - Districts of Azad Kashmir
  - Districts of Gilgit-Baltistan
- Divisions of Pakistan
  - Divisions of Balochistan
  - Divisions of Khyber Pakhtunkhwa
  - Divisions of Punjab
  - Divisions of Sindh
  - Divisions of Azad Kashmir
  - Divisions of Gilgit-Baltistan
