= Noian Wala =

Town and Union Council in Wazirabad Tehsil

Noian Wala نویان والا Noin Wala
- Town
- Location of Noian Wala Noian Wala (Pakistan)
- Coordinates: 32.1775137°N 73.8735249°E
- Country: Pakistan
- Province: Punjab
- District: Gujranwala
- Tehsil: Wazirabad
- Number of Union Councils: 1

Population
  - Estimate (2017): 6,241
- Time zone: UTC+05:00 (Pakistan Standard Time)
- Calling code: 055

Noian Wala (Urdu: نویان والا), also spelled Noin Wala, is a town and union council in Wazirabad Tehsil, Gujranwala District, Punjab, Pakistan.

== See also ==
- Gujranwala
- Wazirabad
- Badoki Saikhwan
- Udhowali
- Hamboki
- Kot Ladha
- Chabba Sindhwan
