= Philloki =

Pakistani village

Philloki پِھلوکی
- Village
- Location within Pakistan Location within Punjab, Pakistan
- Coordinates: 31.7855°N 73.4588°E
- Country: Pakistan
- Province: (Punjab, Pakistan) Punjab
- District: Gujranwala
- Tehsil: Nowshera Virkan

Population (2021)
  - Total: 8,000
- Time zone: UTC+5 (PST)
- Calling code: 055

Philloki ( Urdu : پِھلوکی)is a village located near a town Qila Didar Singh Tehsil Nowshera Virkan, District Gujranwala, Punjab.

== Geography ==
Philloki is located near town Qila Didar Singh, in District Gujranwala, Punjab, Pakistan. It's in the west of Qila Didar Singh and Gujranwala.

== Education ==
Education System is good. There are many public and private school in village.

- Government High School For Boys
- Government High School For Girls

== See also ==
- Badoki Saikhwan
- Qila Didar Singh
- Hamboki
- Chabba Sindhwan
- Gujranwala
