= Mananwala =

Town in Punjab, Pakistan

Mananwala مانانوالہ
- City
- Location in Pakistan Mananwala (Pakistan)
- Coordinates: 31°35′15″N 73°41′23″E
- Country: Pakistan
- Province: Punjab
- District: Sheikhupura
- Union Councils: UC.-100/1
- Postal Code: 39170

Area
  - Total: 9 km^{2} (3.5 sq mi)

Population (2023)
  - Total: 51,746
  - Density: 5,700/km^{2} (15,000/sq mi)
- Time zone: UTC+5 (PST)
- Postal code: 39170
- Area code: 056

Manawala (Urdu: مانانوالہ) is a city in Sheikhupura District, Punjab, Pakistan. It is situated on the Lahore-Sheikhupura-Faisalabad road. (Note: Alternatively ways of spelling 'Mananwala' exist, such as: Manan Wala, Mannawala, Manna Wala, Manawala, or Mana Wala.)

== History ==
Prior to the Partition of India, Mananwala was established in 1890 by Sardar Bahadur Kirpal Singh Mann, head of the famous Jat Sikh Mann Sardars of Mughalchak, Gujranwala. Initially consisting of five large Havelis within a fortified perimeter, Mananwala has now expanded into a sizeable city of more than 9 square kilometres and with a population of over 50,000 people. The ancestral territories of the Mann Sardars of Mughalchak also included Qila Shabdev Singh, Qila Mihan Singh, Qila Didar Singh, and Maan. In reference to this family, Lepel H. Griffin footnotes that "there is a saying, well known in the country, to the effect that three families in the Panjab, Attariwala, Mann, and Majithia, have possessed the greatest number of remarkable men. The Attariwala Sardars are brave and faithless. The Mann Sardars, handsome, gallant and true; the Majithias, wise and timid."

Hari Ram Gupta accounts that in mid-eighteenth century, in order to establish and strengthen the Sukerchakia Misl, Charat Singh made four major matrimonial alliances, one of which was made with the Mann Sardars of Mughalchak. Sardar "Charat Singh's son Mahan Singh was married to the daughter of Sardar Jai Singh Mann of Mogalchak". Sardar Jai Singh Mann was the Sardar of the Mughalchak Misal, and led his forces alongside Sardar Charat Singh, the Sardar of the Sukerchakia Misl, in the military expeditions of Tsa Khel, Pindi Bhattiari, Gujrat, and Sialkot. Sardar Jai Singh Mann, with his younger brothers, Sardar Nar singh Mann, Sardar Mana Singh Mann, and Sardar Pahar Singh Mann, also marched with his forces to Jammu with Sardar Maha Singh when in 1780 the Sukerchakia and Mogalchak forces defeated Raja Brij Raj Deo. The union of marriage between the Sardar Charat Singh's son and Sardar Jai Singh Mann's daughter helped unite Mogalchaks and Sukerchakias, keeping in line with sardar Charat Singh's bid to strengthen the Sukerchakias misal. Other key matrimonial alliances made by Sardar Charat Singh were as with the Sardars Sohel Singh and Sahib Singh of the Bhangi Misl, and Sardar Dal Singh of Akālgarh.

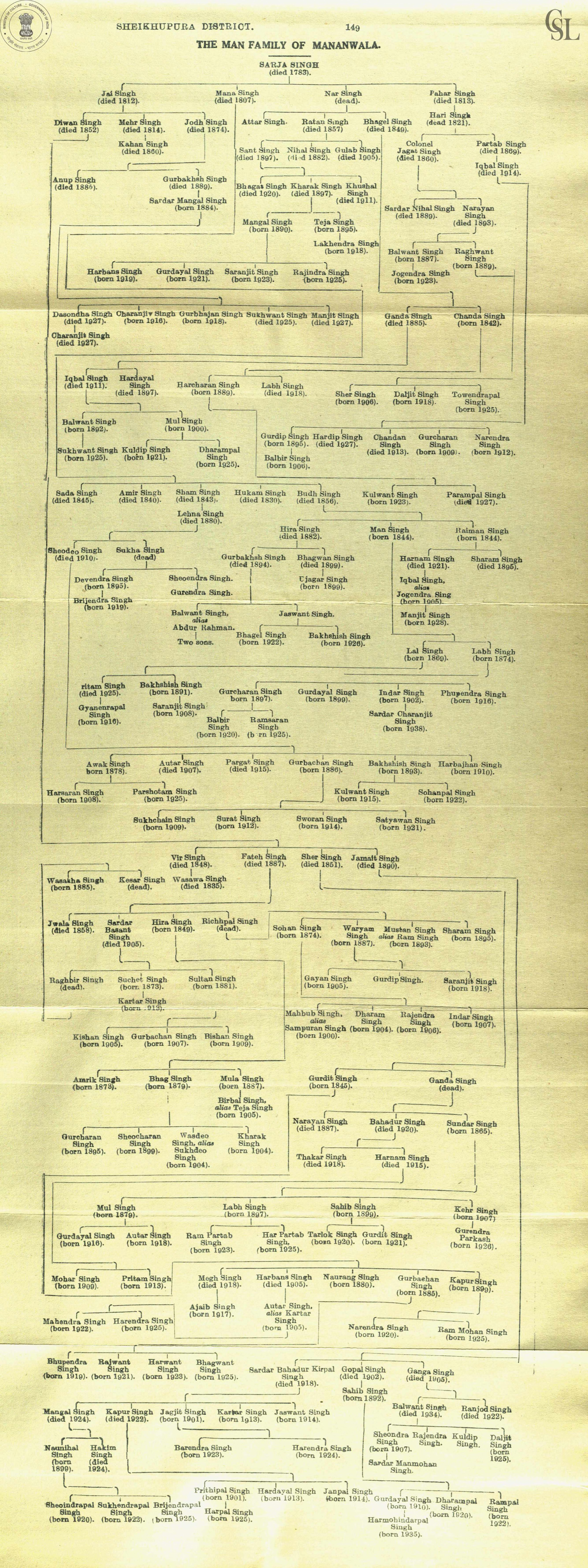
Genealogical pedigree (family-tree) of the Man family of Mananwala, Punjab, revised pedigree-table (1940)

Lepel H. Griffin records that the Mann Sardars were very powerful and continued to hold great prestige and fame even after the rise of Maharaja Ranjit Singh, with "at one point there were no fewer than twenty-two members of it holding key military appointments of great trust and honour". Griffin further articulates that Maharaja Ranjit Singh "often used to say that the Man Sardars were his "Wari Ka Tewar"," interpreted by Griffin as either 'the jewels of his court' or 'his best suit of clothes'.

The Mann Sardars were very much at the centre of, and fought both the Anglo-Sikh Wars between 1845 and 1849. General S. Rattan Singh Mann and Sardar Kahn Singh Mann led their own brigades of artillery, infantry and cavalry during the battles of Sobraon, Ferozeshah, Mudki, and Aliwal. A letter during the Second Anglo-Sikh War was intercepted by Captain James Abbott, the Assistant Resident, on deputation to Huzara, on 16th August 1848 from Sardar Chattar Singh Attariwalla to Sardar Budh Singh Mann in which Sardar Chhatar Singh stated that "I raised this mutiny in the name of the family of Maun"

The Mann Sardars of Mughalchak and Mananwala have several recognised cadet branches which are the once powerful houses of Bhagga under Sardar Amar Singh Mann, Ramnagar, Malwa, Manawala in Amritsar, and include Sardar Kahn Singh Mann. Denzil Ibbetson notes that "the 'mirasis' or bards of the Mán Sardars of Mughalchak-Mananwala state that the whole of the Mán, Bhular and half the Her tribe of Rajputs were the earliest kshatriya immigrants from Rajputana to the Punjab. Due to which, the Mán, Bhúlar, and Her tribes (section 435) are known as the asl or 'original'."

== Demographics ==
Population

Historical population
Year	Pop.	±% p.a.
1972	11,238	—
1981	...	—
1998	25,564	—
2017	45,740	+3.11%
2023	51,746	+2.08%

According to the 2023 census, Mananwala had a population of 51,746, up from 45,740 in 2017.

== See also ==
- Attari
- Sandhanwalia
- Gujranwala
