= Majju Chak =

Town and Union Council in Nowshera Virkan Tehsil

Majju Chak مجو چک Majhoo Chak
- Town
- Location of Majju Chak Majju Chak (Pakistan)
- Coordinates: 31.907535°N 74.062696°E
- Country: Pakistan
- Province: Punjab
- District: Gujranwala
- Tehsil: Nowshera Virkan
- Number of Union Councils: 1

Area
  - Total: 2.01 sq mi (5.20 km^{2})

Population
  - Estimate (2017): 5,803
- Time zone: UTC+05:00 (Pakistan Standard Time)
- Calling code: 055

Majju Chak (Urdu: مجو چک), also spelled as Majhoo Chak, is a town and Union Council in Nowshera Virkan Tehsil, Gujranwala District, Punjab, Pakistan.

== See also ==
- Gujranwala
- Wazirabad
- Kamoke
- Nowshera Virkan
