= Garmula Virkan =

Town and union council in Punjab, Pakistan

Garmula Virkan گرمولا ورکاں Ghrmullah Virkan
- Town
- Location of Garmula Virkan Garmula Virkan (Pakistan)
- Coordinates: 31.8788674°N 73.950893°E
- Country: Pakistan
- Province: Punjab
- District: Gujranwala
- Tehsil: Nowshera Virkan
- Number of Union Councils: 1

Area
  - Total: 1.16 sq mi (3.01 km^{2})

Population
  - Estimate (2017): 6,590
- Time zone: UTC+05:00 (Pakistan Standard Time)
- postal code type: 39421
- Calling code: 055

Garmula Virkan (Urdu: گرمولا ورکاں) also spelled as Ghrmullah Virkan, is a town and union council in Nowshera Virkan Tehsil, Gujranwala District, Punjab, Pakistan.

== See also ==
- Gujranwala
- Wazirabad
- Kamoke
- Nowshera Virkan
