= Mari Bhindran =

Town and Union Council in Nowshera Virkan Tehsil

Mari Bhindran ماڑی بھنڈراں
- Town
- Location of Mari Bhindran Mari Bhindran (Pakistan)
- Coordinates: 31.9628584°N 74.0415536°E
- Country: Pakistan
- Province: Punjab
- District: Gujranwala
- Tehsil: Nowshera Virkan
- Number of Union Councils: 1

Area
  - Total: 1.04 sq mi (2.70 km^{2})

Population
  - Estimate (2017): 5,031
- Time zone: UTC+05:00 (Pakistan Standard Time)
- Calling code: 055

Mari Bhindran (Urdu: ماڑی بھنڈراں) is a town and union council in Nowshera Virkan Tehsil of Gujranwala District, Punjab, Pakistan.

== See also ==
- Gujranwala
- Wazirabad
- Kamoke
- Nowshera Virkan
