= Harchoki Goraya =

Harchoki ہرچوکی Harchoki Goraya
- Village
- Country: Pakistan
- Province: Punjab
- District: Gujranwala
- Tehsil: Nowshera Virkan

Area
  - Total: 1.2 sq mi (3 km^{2})

Population
  - Estimate (2017): 2,549
- Time zone: UTC+05:00 (Pakistan Standard Time)
- Postal code type: 52361
- Calling code: 055

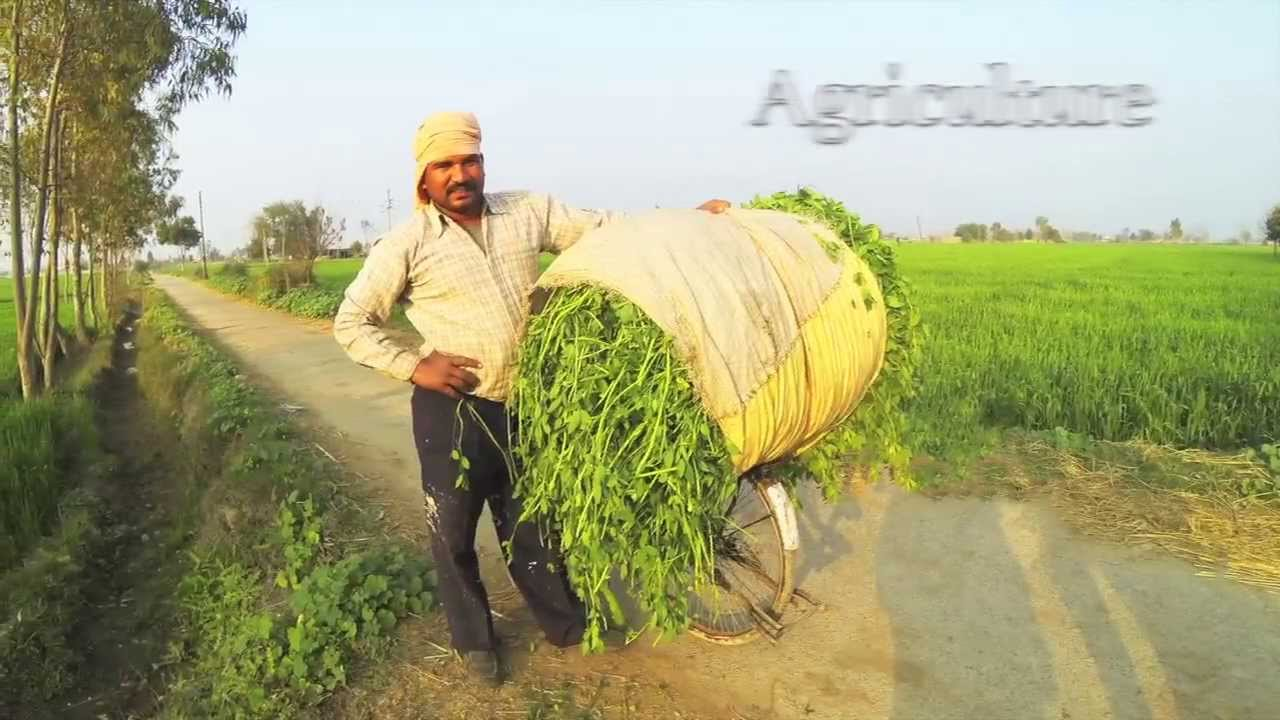
Herchoki Goraya

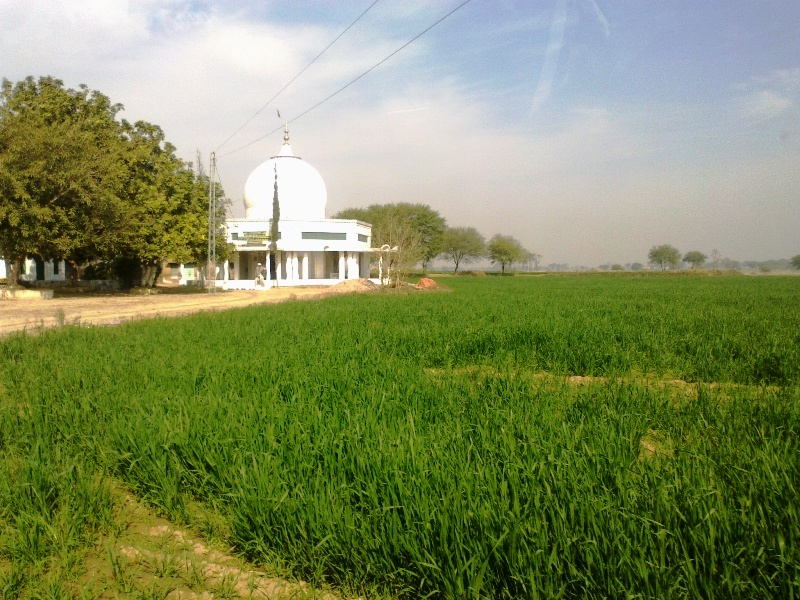
Darbaar sharif

Harchoki is a village located in Nowshera Virkan Tehsil of Gujranwala, in the Punjab province, Pakistan. The total population of this village is about 2,500.

== Education ==
There are two primary schools, one each for boys and girls, in Harchoki Goraya. Students go to Buddha Goraya and Qila Mian Singh to attend high school. Parents send their children to private schools in Gujranwala, Dhariwal and Sherakot.

== Society and culture ==
Punjabi is the main language spoken in the village. Most of the people earn income through agriculture, and they are associated with the Jatt, Warraich, Cheema, Kharal and Goraya clans. There is also a considerable population of Christians.
