= Boppra Kalan =

Town and union council in Punjab, Pakistan

Boppra Kalan بوپرا کلاں Bopra Kalan
- Town
- Country: Pakistan
- Province: Punjab
- District: Gujranwala
- Tehsil: Nowshera Virkan
- Number of Union Councils: 1

Area
  - Total: 0.97 sq mi (2.50 km^{2})

Population
  - Estimate (2017): 2,497
- Time zone: UTC+05:00 (Pakistan Standard Time)
- Calling code: 055

Boppra Kalan (Urdu: بوپرا کلاں), also spelled as Bopra Kalan, is a town and Union Council in Nowshera Virkan Tehsil, Gujranwala District, Punjab, Pakistan.

== See also ==
- Gujranwala
- Wazirabad
- Kamoke
- Nowshera Virkan
