= Baddo Ratta =

Town and Union Council in Nowshera Virkan Tehsil

Baddo Ratta بڈو رتہ
- Town
- Location of Baddo Ratta Baddo Ratta (Pakistan)
- Coordinates: 31.9349466°N 73.9903875°E
- Country: Pakistan
- Province: Punjab
- District: Gujranwala
- Tehsil: Nowshera Virkan
- Number of Union Councils: 1

Area
  - Total: 0.89 sq mi (2.30 km^{2})

Population
  - Estimate (2017): 6,608
- Time zone: UTC+05:00 (Pakistan Standard Time)
- postal code type: 52371
- Calling code: 055

Baddo Ratta (Urdu: بڈو رتہ) is a town and union council in Nowshera Virkan Tehsil, Gujranwala District, of the Punjab province in Pakistan.

== See also ==
- Gujranwala
- Wazirabad
- Kamoke
- Nowshera Virkan
