= Hardo Rattali =

Town and union council in Punjab, Pakistan

Hardo Rattali ہردو رتالی Hardo Ratali
- Town
- Location of Mari Bhindran Hardo Rattali (Pakistan)
- Coordinates: 31.9628584°N 74.0415536°E
- Country: Pakistan
- Province: Punjab
- District: Gujranwala
- Tehsil: Nowshera Virkan
- Number of Union Councils: 1

Area
  - Total: 1.04 sq mi (2.70 km^{2})

Population
  - Estimate (2017): 3,769
- Time zone: UTC+05:00 (Pakistan Standard Time)
- Calling code: 055

Hardo Rattali (Urdu: ہردو رتالی), also spelled Hardo Ratali, is a town and union council in Nowshera Virkan Tehsil, Gujranwala District, Punjab, Pakistan.

== See also ==
- Gujranwala
- Wazirabad
- Kamoke
- Nowshera Virkan
