= Mari Khurd =

Town and Union Council in Nowshera Virkan Tehsil

Mari Khurd ماری خورد
- Town
- Location of Mari Khurd Mari Khurd (Pakistan)
- Coordinates: 31.9726393°N 74.0718256°E
- Country: Pakistan
- Province: Punjab
- District: Gujranwala
- Tehsil: Nowshera Virkan
- Number of Union Councils: 1

Area
  - Total: 1.35 sq mi (3.50 km^{2})

Population
  - Estimate (2017): 5,955
- Time zone: UTC+05:00 (Pakistan Standard Time)
- Calling code: 055

Mari Khurd (Urdu: ماری خورد) is a town and union council in Nowshera Virkan Tehsil, Gujranwala District, in Pakistan's Punjab province.

== See also ==
- Gujranwala
- Wazirabad
- Kamoke
- Nowshera Virkan
