= Ghumman Wala =

Town and union council in Punjab, Pakistan

Ghumman Wala گھمن والا Ghuman Wala
- Town
- Location of Ghumman Wala Ghumman Wala (Pakistan)
- Coordinates: 32.0357558°N 74.1370511°E
- Country: Pakistan
- Province: Punjab
- District: Gujranwala
- Tehsil: Nowshera Virkan
- Number of Union Councils: 1

Area
  - Total: 1.35 sq mi (3.50 km^{2})

Population (2017 Pakistani census)
  - Total: 10,447
  - Density: 7,730/sq mi (2,980/km^{2})
- Time zone: UTC+05:00 (Pakistan Standard Time)
- postal code type: 52251
- Calling code: 055

Ghumman Wala (Urdu: گھمن والا), also spelled as Ghuman Wala, is a town and union council in Nowshera Virkan Tehsil, Gujranwala District, Punjab, Pakistan.

== See also ==
- Gujranwala
- Wazirabad
- Kamoke
- Nowshera Virkan
