= Hameed pur Kalan =

- Village
- Location within Pakistan
- Coordinates: 32.16°N 73.51°E
- Country: Pakistan
- Province: Punjab
- District: Gujranwala
- Time zone: UTC+5 (PST)

Hameed Pur Kalan is a village in Kamoki, in Gujranwala District, Punjab, Pakistan.
