= Tattle Aali =

Town and union council in Punjab, Pakistan

Tattle Aali تتلے عالی Tatlay Aali
- Town
- Location of Tattle Aali Tattle Aali (Pakistan)
- Coordinates: 31.9925446°N 74.1194898°E
- Country: Pakistan
- Province: Punjab
- District: Gujranwala
- Tehsil: Nowshera Virkan
- Number of Union Councils: 1

Area
  - Total: 3.99 sq mi (10.34 km^{2})

Population
  - Estimate (2017): 30,554
- Time zone: UTC+05:00 (Pakistan Standard Time)
- postal code type: 52250
- Calling code: 055

Tattle Aali (Urdu: تتلے عالی), also spelled as Tatlay Aali, is a town and union council in Nowshera Virkan Tehsil, Gujranwala District, Punjab, Pakistan.

== See also ==
- Gujranwala
- Wazirabad
- Kamoke
- Nowshera Virkan
