= Mihan Singh =

Sikh governor of Kashmir

Mihan Singh Kumedan
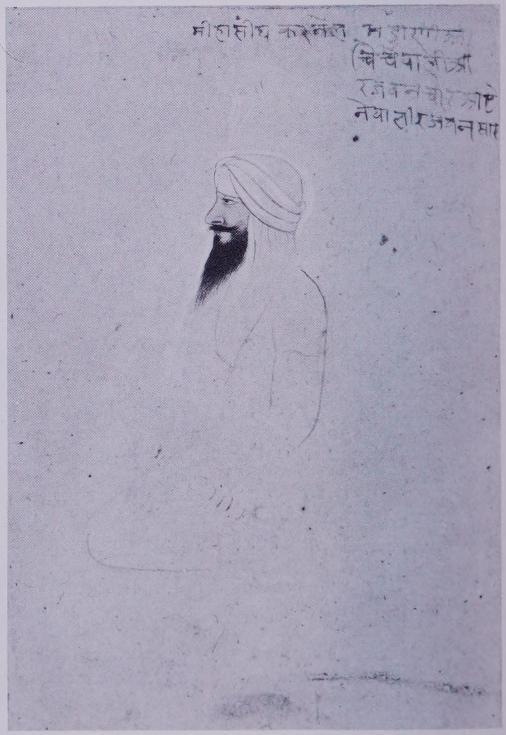
- Drawing of Mihan Singh of the Sikh Empire, Sikh school, Punjab Plains, ca.1845–50

Sikh governor of Kashmir
- In office July 1834 – 17 April 1841
- Preceded by: Sher Singh
- Succeeded by: Ghulam Muhy-ud-Din

Personal details
- Born: Unknown; Mann, Gujranwala, Sikh Empire
- Died: 1841; Srinagar, Sikh Empire

Mihan Singh (died 17 April 1841) was the Sikh governor (nazim) of Kashmir province from 1834 to 1841. (Note: His name is alternatively transliterated as 'Mehan' or 'Mian'. His name is commonly appended with the 'Kumedan' title.) He was the commander of a Sikh infantry battalion, which led to him being bestowed with the Kumedan title. After the death of Maharaja Ranjit Singh in 1839, Mihan Singh advocated for the partial independence from Lahore. In the aftermath of his failed proposal, he was killed by rebellious troops on 17 April 1841.

Mihan Singh was a Khatri from Gujranwala. He had taken on the position of governor of Kashmir at a dire time for the region but was able to rehabilitate Kashmir during his governorship. Mihan Singh enacted many popular reforms that addressed hunger, poverty and unemployment in Kashmir during his tenure as governor. He was assisted in his administration by a Kashmiri Pandit named Pandit Ganesh Dhar and a Punjabi Muslim named Mohammad Afzal Qazi. He was the founder of Qila Mihan Singh, which was named after him.

== Background ==
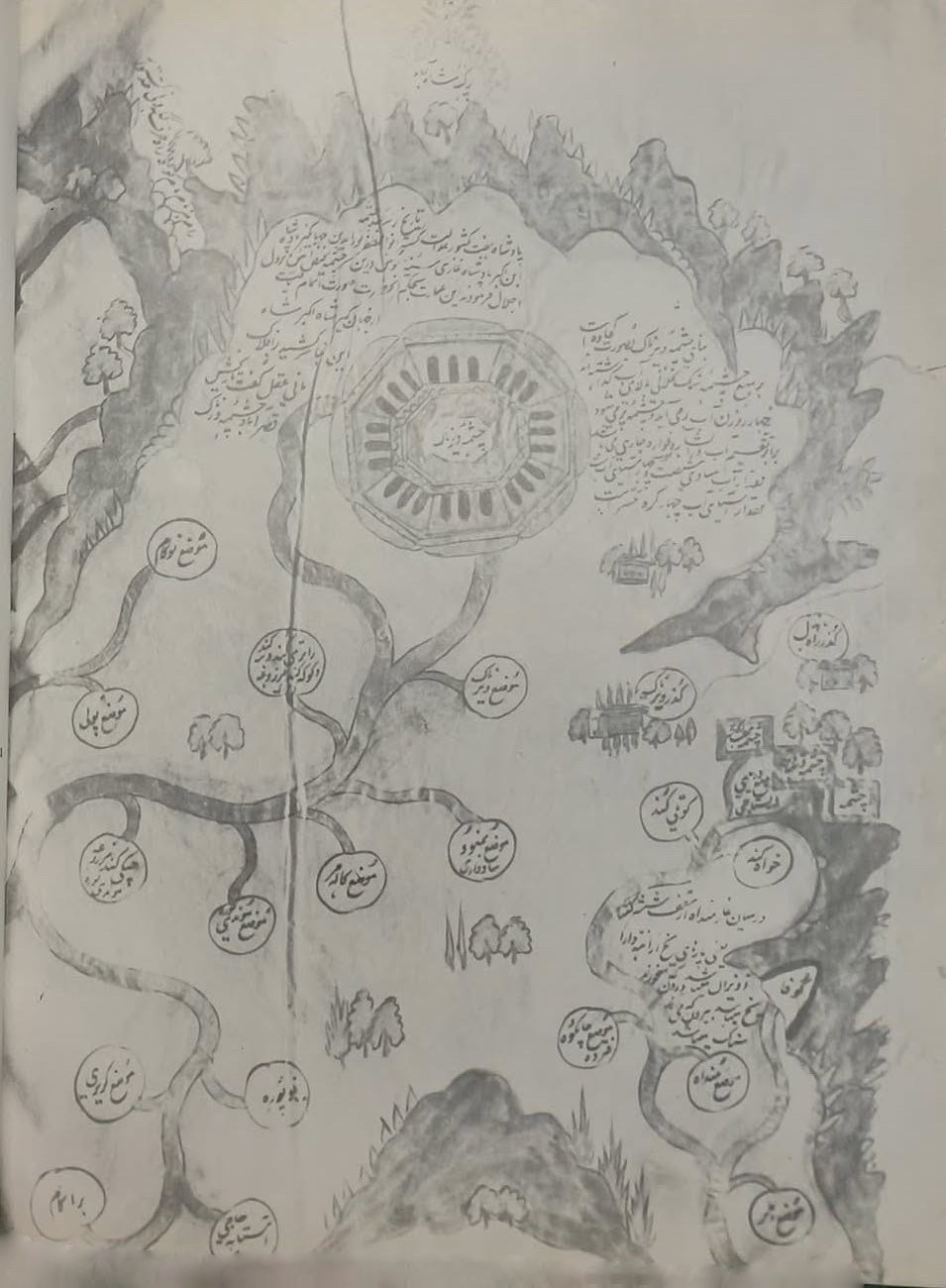
Sikh map of Kashmir created shortly before their campaign in the region in 1819

Kashmir had been conquered by the Afghan Durranis in 1752, having taken it from its previous Mughal rulers. In 1819, an invading Sikh force under the command of Misr Diwan Chand and Raja Gulab Singh annexed the region to the Sikh Empire. The city of Srinagar came under the Sikhs on 5 July 1819. Whilst initially the local Kashmiri residents welcomed their new Sikh overlords as liberators, this hope was shattered due to seemingly oppressive policies the Sikh administrators enacted onto the Kashmiris. The total annual amount of revenue expected from Kashmir was fixed and the ijaradars (revenue farmers) were given a free rein to extract funds from the mostly Muslim populace in the Kashmir Valley through the levying of large sums, which enriched the ijaradars. Mihan Singh's brother, Gurmak Singh, had acted as the governor of Kashmir in 1825.

== Governance of Kashmir ==
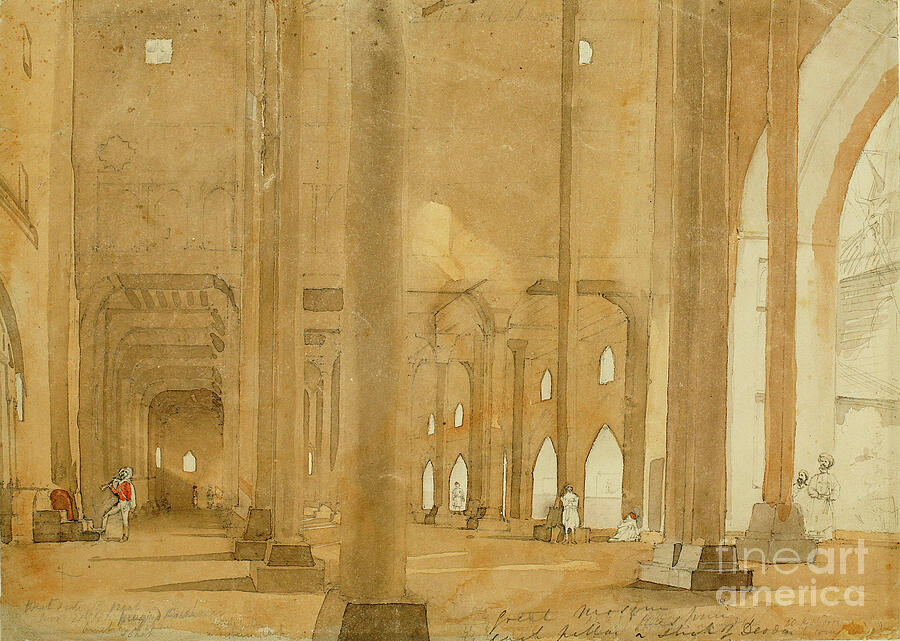
Painting of Sikh soldiers stationed in the Jama Masjid in Srinagar, Kashmir, during Sikh-rule, by Godfrey Thomas Vigne, 1835

Mohan Lal Kashmiri recorded words praising the martial abilities of Mihan Singh in his diary on 14 February 1832. Before the appointment of Mihan Singh to the governorship of Kashmir, there were mixed successes and failures of previous governors of the region. The predecessory acting governors under nominal governor Sher Singh consisted of two Sikhs (Khushal Singh and Gurmukh Singh (Note: Khushal Singh was born a Hindu and later converted to Sikhism.)) and one Muslim (Sheikh Ghulam Mohiuddin), with there being instances of corruption amongst them. Prior to the trio, the former acting governor Wasakha Singh had also engaged in corruption. In 1833, a serious famine in Kashmir erupted with the Sikh state sending food supplies to relieve the populace.

Mihan Singh succeeded the nominal governor Sher Singh and the acting governors Shaik Gholam Muhyi Addin and Jamadar Kushal Singh as governor of Kashmir in July 1834. Other sources claim he became the governor in October 1834. Pandit Ganesh Dar was appointed as Mihan Singh's Chief Minister and had experience in revenue and administration. A Punjabi Muslim named Mohammad Afzal Qazi, an officer of Mihan Singh, also assisted the administration. Mihan Singh was appointed to his post by the maharaja in Lahore. Mihan Singh was the first Sikh nizam (governor) of Kashmir to receive a salary. The region of Kashmir was in a poor-state due to previous mismanagement, thus Mihan Singh's administration took-on new measures to recover the industrial and agricultural economy of Kashmir. Incentives were given to agriculturalists and horticulturists, improving the shawl economy. Thus, due to these reforms Kashmir had for the first-time since Afghan-rule become self-sufficient in food. It is said that Mihan Singh himself would pay visits to shops and ghats of Kashmir to inspect weights and measures an delve out punishments to violators. The administrative treasury managed to get replenished during his tenure.

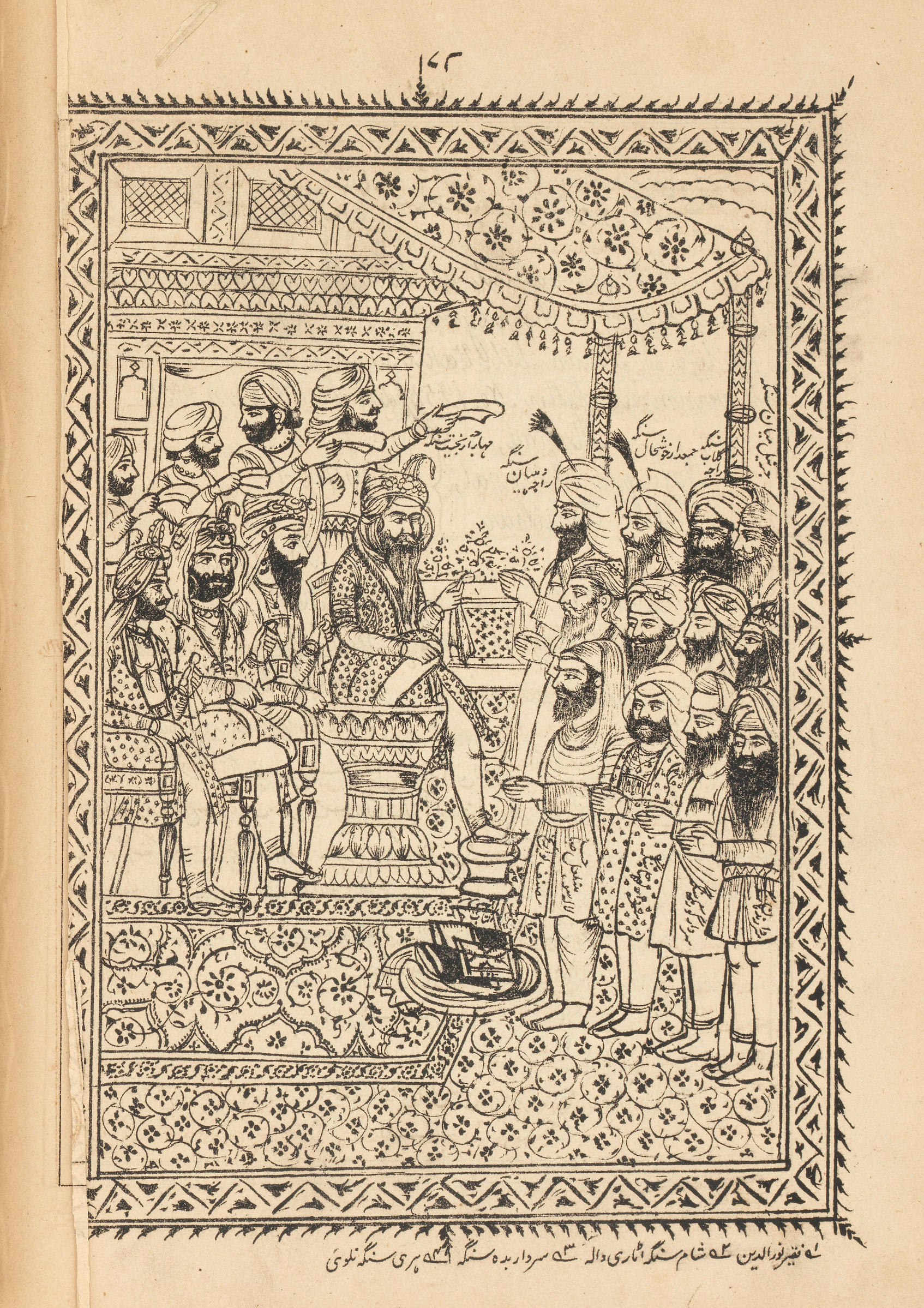
Court of Maharaja Ranjit Singh, with important officials depicted, lithograph, Umdat-ut-Tawarikh (vol. II), Albert Press, Lahore, 1886. Mihan Singh is depicted in the top-right corner.

The following reforms and measures were undertaken during his governorship of Kashmir:

- Abolishment of duties on grain and other essential items of daily consumption
- Imported large amounts of grain and poultry from Punjab
- Doled-out harsh punishments on black-marketers
- Gave relief in land revenue to encourage cultivation, such as by granting taqavi loans generously to cultivators
- Promotion of trade by lowering tariff duties
- Loans were given to shawl factory owners to improve production
- Development of a trade network consisting of imports and exports with Ladakh, Punjab, British India, Afghanistan, and Central Asia
- Construction of serais at convenient places for traders and travellers
- Facilities of credit and correspondence through state postal service were provided
- Suppression of the Galwans led by Khaira Galwan, an organized body of bandits or thugs who roamed around committing dacoities, and abducted women and girls
- Construction and planting of a garden known as the Basant Bagh, which partly consisted of chinar trees
- Ending tribal revolts harshly
- Compilation of the Tarikh-i-Kashmir
- Promotion of religious and cultural freedom

Mihan Singh did not support Zorawar Singh's invasion of Ladakh due to disputes over the trade of shawl wool. Mihan Singh went as far as tampering with the peace-talks between the Ladakhis and Dogras. Mihan Singh had originally wanted to be the one to lead a Sikh invasion of Ladakh but instead the task was given to Gulab Singh, who appointed general Zorawar Singh to accomplish the feat, with Mihan Singh merely being instructed to assist the Dogras with their invasion of Ladakh. When the Ladakhis later rebelled, Mihan Singh was blamed for it. The shawl industry in Kashmir had been severely weakened due to Gulab Singh diverting the supply of wool from Ladakh to Jammu via the newly acquired Kishtwar, which opened a shorter albeit more difficult route for the supply of wool. According to Jia Lal Kalam, Sunni-Shia rivalry and riots led to many shawl weavers and merchants, who were mostly Shiites, to leave the Kashmir Valley for Amritsar, Ludhiana, and Jammu. Thus, the shawl economy in Kashmir declined, increasing poverty. Mihan Singh's initial attempts at writing to the Sikh maharaja were intercepted by Dhian Singh Dogra. When word finally reached the maharaja, the Sikh ruler ordered for the supply of wool to Kashmir be restored.

Mihan Singh established some gardens in Kashmir. In 1835, he established and planted the Basant Bagh, with it being planted by Chinar trees. He is also responsible for planting the Mandir Bagh.

In 1836, Mihan Singh introduced a new silver rupee to Kashmir, known as the Hari Singhi, to either boost exports or to meet the shortage of silver. The rupee had a value reduced by 1–2 annas (from 11 annas to 9 annas) and was 50% silver in-content.

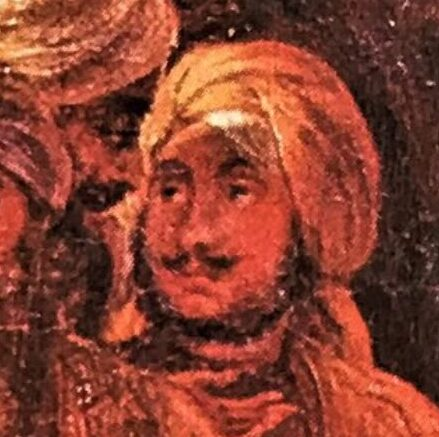
Mihan Singh Kumedan, detail from a photograph of a section of 'The Court of Lahore', by August Schoefft, ca.1840's–1855, Vienna, after drawings made at Lahore, ca.1841–55, with identifications for some of the figures

The Sikh governors of distant provinces, such as Kashmir, were suspected of harbouring secessionist sentiments by the Lahore court. After the death of Maharaja Singh in 1839, Mihan Singh pushed for partial-independence of Kashmir from Lahore, being supported by Gulab Singh of Jammu. Shortly after the enthronement of Maharaja Sher Singh in early 1841, two battalions of the Sikh army stationed in Kashmir rose up in rebellion. On 17 April 1841, rebelling soldiers murdered Mihan Singh at his personal residence in Srinagar at night, leading to the failure of the proposal. The soldiers who killed him were against his secessionist aims. Shortly after the death of Mihan Singh, his official Pandit Ganesh Dar was also murdered.

Order was restored in Kashmir by Gulab Singh after Mihan Singh's death. Mihan Singh was succeeded as governor of Kashmir by Sheikh Ghulam Mohiuddin, who appointed Pandit Tilak Chand Munshi as his Chief Minister. They continued to carry-out effective and popular reforms, similar to Mihan Singh and Pandit Ganesh Dar before them. Kashmir would later fall into the hands of Gulab Singh, who obtained it through the Treaty of Amritsar, signed on 16 March 1846 between Gulab Singh and representatives of Sir Henry Hardinge.

== Legacy ==
Sir Walter R. Lawrence stated the following about Mihan Singh in his 1895 work The Valley of Kashmir:

In 1834 Colonel Mian (Mihan) Singh, the best of all the Sikh Governors came to Kashmir, and by importing grain and eggs from the Panjab, he restored some measure of prosperity to the villagers who had lost their grain seed and fowls in the awful famine. Mian (Mihan) Singh, with a view to stimulating population, emitted the tax upon marriages, and set to work to bring some order into the administration. Revenue divisions were made, and the villages were either farmed out to contractors or leased on the principle that the State took half of the produce in kind. Agricultural advances were made free of interest, proper weights were introduced, and fraudulent middlemen were punished. Colonel Mian (Mihan) Singh decided cases justly and quickly and won a great reputation in Kashmir. But his useful life was cut short by mutinous soldiers.

— Walter Roper Lawrence, The Valley of Kashmir (1895)

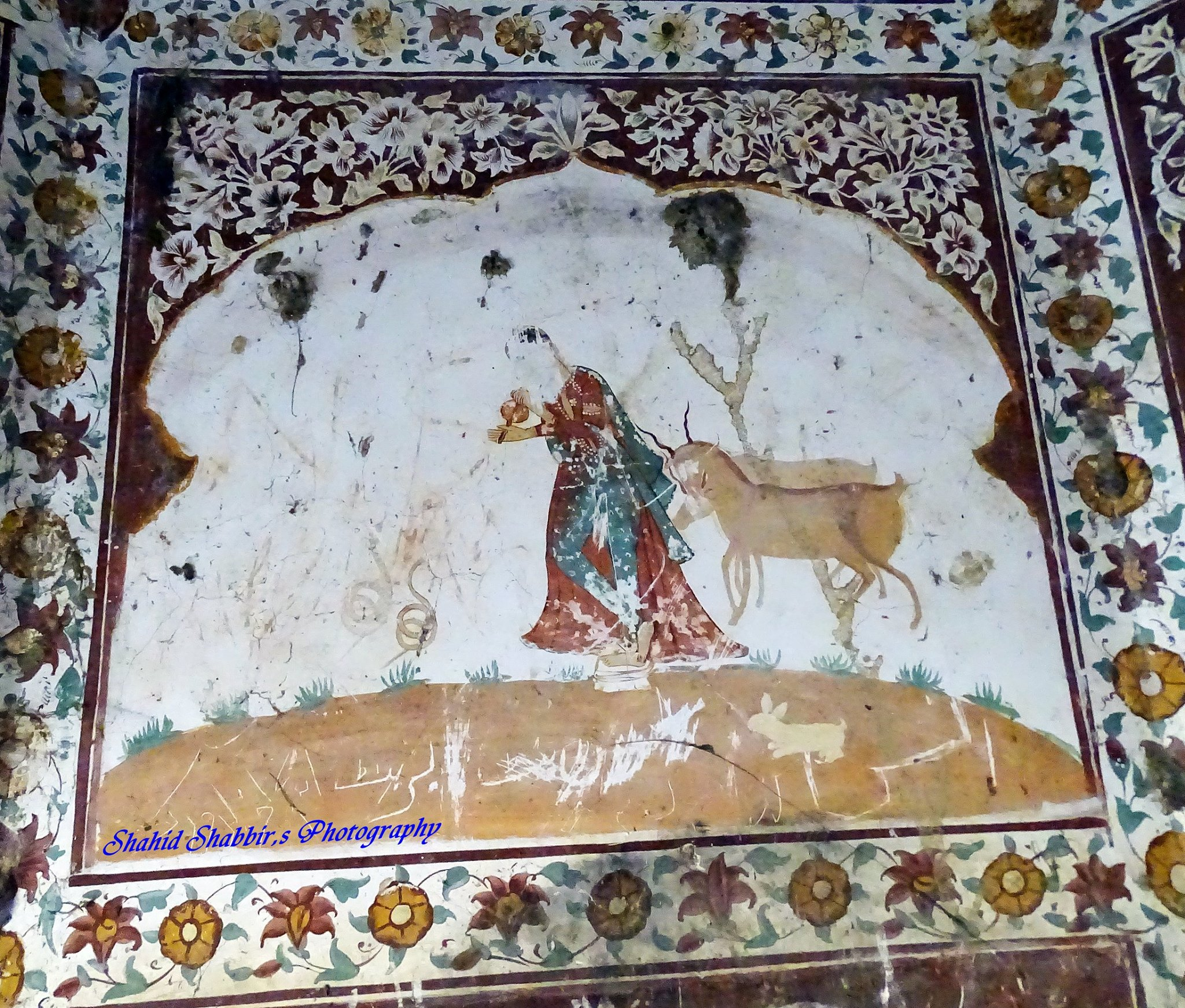
Fresco from a Samadh at Qila Mihan Singh

Pearce Gervis in his 1954 book titled This is Kashmir praised Mihan Singh for being an enlightened ruler who brought relief to the Kashmir Valley. Qila Mihan Singh, located around ten kilometres from Gujranwala, is named after him and is believed to have been founded by him.
