= Sardars of Vahali =

The Sardars of Vahali were historical jagirdars (landowners) of the villages of Wahali Zer and Wahali Bala in present-day Chakwal District of Pakistan. In 1909, this was one of the largest landowning families in the province, holding close to 14,000 acres, and was prominently featured in Lepel Griffin's Punjab Chiefs book. Members of the family served in the administrations of several rulers of Punjab and Kashmir - from the Mughal emperor Shah Jahan to the Rajas of Kashmir and Poonch, Queen Victoria of the British Colonial Government, and King George after her. Their power declined after the Partition of India in 1947, when the family lost most of its landholdings and wealth.

== History ==
The earliest member of the family was Diwan Karn Mal, who served as an advisor to Shah Jahan. Mal supervised the construction of the gardens at the Taj Mahal, and was later executed for refusing to convert to Islam. While the family's original surname was Jauhar, it soon changed to Singh. The family achieved its most prominence under Bhag Singh, a commander in a local army.

Sardar Hara Singh, his son, served as a minister who played a large role in the formation of Poonch district, India. He helped organise government departments and develop the territory. For his work, he was awarded the village of Kalhota and monopolies on the salt, buckwheat, Chikari wood and Chil wood trades in Poonch. The family was very wealthy, after the death of Sardar, building a 100-room palace. Subsequent members of the family would serve as Generals and in other prominent positions.
