= Jalalabad, Gujranwala =

Jalalabad
- Location within Pakistan
- Coordinates: 31.55°N 73.51°E
- Country: Pakistan
- Province: Punjab
- Elevation: 209 m (686 ft)
- Time zone: UTC+5 (PST)

Jalalabad is a village in the Gujranwala District of Punjab, Pakistan. It is located in Nowshera Virkan Tehsil, at 31°55'27N 73°51'52E, and at an altitude of 209 metres (688 feet).
