= Mughalchak =

Village in Gujranwala District, Punjab, Pakistan

- Village
- Location within Punjab, Pakistan Location within Pakistan
- Coordinates: 32°8′7″N 74°5′25″E
- Country: Pakistan
- Province: Punjab
- District: Gujranwala
- Established: 16th century
- Time zone: UTC+5 (PST)

Mughalchak (Note: Alternative spellings include Mughal Chak, Moghalchak, Moghal Chak, Mughal Chakk, Moghal Chakk, Mughalchakk and Moghalchakk.) is a village in Gujranwala District, Punjab, Pakistan. It lies west of Gujranwala and is the ancestral seat of the Sikh Mann Sardars, a family of considerable military and political prominence during the Mughal Empire period, the Sikh Confederacy period, the Sikh Empire period, and British Colonial period.

== History ==
=== Origins and the Mughalchak Misl ===
The village of Mughalchak is situated within the remains of a fort with four burjis. (Note: A burji is a corner tower of a fortified structure.) The ancestral territories of the Mann Sardars of Mughalchak also included Qila Shabdev Singh, Qila Mihan Singh, Qila Didar Singh and Maan; including the later establishment of Mananwala in the nineteenth century.

Denzil Ibbetson records that the bards of the Mann Sardars of Mughalchak and Mananwala described the Mann, Bhular and half the Her tribe of Rajputs as the earliest Kshatriya immigrants from Rajputana to the Punjab, on account of which the Mann, Bhular and Her tribes are classified as the asl or "original". Lepel Henry Griffin notes that the local influence of the Mughalchak Sardars is first recorded with Laddha Singh, who is said to have founded the village of Maan during the late fifteenth century and became chaudhri of twenty-two villages, establishing the family's local influence.

Lepel Henry Griffin in the Chiefs of Punjab notes that four generations later, Nika Mann, is said to have expanded the terriroties and established the settlement of Nika Man. According to these traditions, Nika Man later lost the expanded territory to Mirza Kila, the governor of Eminabad. The Mann sardars subsequently reclaimed the expanded territory from Mirza Kila and re-named it Mughal Chak, which symbolically meant territory that used to belong to the Mughals. By the time of Sardar Sarja Singh Mann (d. 1763), a contemporary of Sardar Charat Singh Sukerchakia, the family had become one of the principal landed and military houses of the Gujranwala region.

Sardar Jai Singh Mann was the Sardar of the Mughalchak Misl. He led his forces alongside Sardar Charat Singh, Sardar of the Sukerchakia Misl, in military expeditions at Tsa Khel, Pindi Bhattiari, Gujrat and Sialkot. Sardar Jai Singh Mann, with his younger brothers Sardar Nar Singh Mann, Sardar Mana Singh Mann and Sardar Pahar Singh Mann, also marched with his forces to Jammu alongside Sardar Maha Singh when, in 1780, the Sukerchakia and Mughalchak forces defeated Raja Brij Raj Deo.

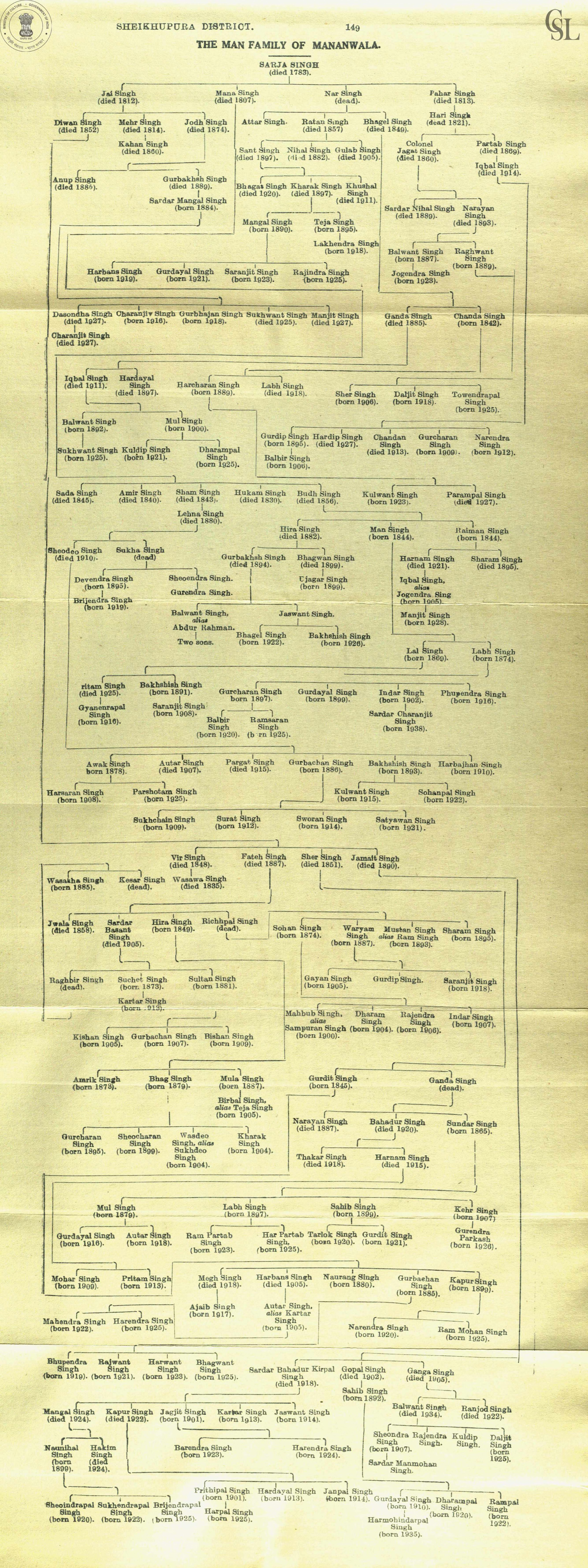
Genealogical pedigree (family-tree) of the Man family of Mananwala, Punjab, revised pedigree-table (1940)

=== Alliance with the Sukerchakia Misl ===
Hari Ram Gupta records that in the mid-18th century, in order to establish and strengthen the Sukerchakia Misl, Ranjit Singh's grandfather Charat Singh contracted four major matrimonial alliances, one of which was with the Mann Sardars of Mughalchak. Specifically, Sardar Charat Singh's son Mahan Singh married the daughter of Sardar Jai Singh Mann of Mughalchak. This union served to consolidate the alliance between the Mughalchak and Sukerchakia misls. The other principal matrimonial alliances contracted by Sardar Charat Singh were with Sardars Sohel Singh and Sahib Singh of the Bhangi Misl, and Sardar Dal Singh of Akalgarh.

=== Under the Sikh Empire ===
Lepel H. Griffin records that the Mann Sardars retained great prestige even after the rise of Maharaja Ranjit Singh, noting that at one point there were no fewer than twenty-two members of the family holding key military appointments of great trust and honour. Griffin also records that Ranjit Singh frequently referred to the Mann Sardars as his "Wari Ka Tewar", which Griffin rendered as "the jewels of his court".

Griffin also recorded the following observation, attributed to contemporaries, regarding three prominent Punjab families: that the Attariwala Sardars were "brave and faithless", the Mann Sardars "handsome, gallant and true", and the Majithias "wise and timid".

=== Anglo-Sikh Wars ===
The Mann Sardars played a prominent role in both Anglo-Sikh Wars between 1845 and 1849. Rattan Singh Mann and Kahn Singh Mann each led their own brigades of artillery, infantry and cavalry during the battles of Sobraon, Ferozeshah, Mudki and Aliwal.

During the Second Anglo-Sikh War, a letter was intercepted on 16 August 1848 by Captain James Abbott, Assistant Resident on deputation to Hazara, from Sardar Chattar Singh Attariwalla to Sardar Budh Singh Mann. In the letter, Sardar Chattar Singh stated that "I raised this mutiny in the name of the family of Maun [sic]".

=== Cadet branches ===
The Mann Sardars of Mughalchak and Mananwala have several recognised cadet branches, including the houses of Bhagga under Sardar Amar Singh Mann, Ramnagar, Malwa, Manawala in Amritsar, and Sardar Kahn Singh Mann.

== See also ==
- Attari
- Sandhanwalia
- Majitha
