= Naddha =

- Village
- Location within Pakistan
- Coordinates: 32°05′41″N 74°29′37″E
- Country: Pakistan
- Province: Punjab
- District: Gujranwala
- Time zone: UTC+5 (PST)

Naddha is a village located at the border of three districts; Gujranwala and Sialkot, in the Punjab province of Pakistan. It is located in Wahndo police station jurisdiction in Gujranwala district near Sakhana Bajwa village. Naddha only has one middle school for girls and one primary school for boys. The village is located on an old route from Narowal to Gujranwala and further to Hafizabad and Sargodha. The road still exists today, but for single-lane traffic only. The village located in the main kallar track which is famous for its aromatic rice (Basmati) with has been described as having the best aroma rice in world. Naddah located at the border areas of Sialkot, Narowal and Gujranwala. They also have connection with motorway (M11) Lahore to Sialkot just 7km away. Naddah have mostly Muslim population with just around 8% non Muslim (Christians).

There was a sizable population of Sikhs and some Hindus before they migrated to India. Muslims from Eastern Punjab side migrated to Pakistan and settled here.
