= Chabba Sindhwan =

Pakistani village

Chabba Sindhwan چبہ‌سندھواں
- Village
- Location within Pakistan
- Coordinates: 32.079731°N 73.872148°E
- Country: Pakistan
- Province: Punjab
- District: Gujranwala
  - Density: 70/km^{2} (180/sq mi)
- Time zone: UTC+5 (PST)

Chabba Sindhwan (Urdu : چبہ‌سندھواں) is a village and union council in Tehsil Nowshera Virkan, District Gujranwala, Punjab, Pakistan. This village, located in the west of Gujranwala city, has about 4000-6000 population estimated (2020).

amous

N,73.8728 E, west of Gujranwala city in Gujranwala District, Punjab, Pakistan. Villages around the Chabba Sindhwan are;

- Nokhar, Nadan Kot and Chak Virkan in East
- Jallan and Dera Shah Jamal in West
- Nathu Siwiya in South
- Kot Ladha and Badoki Saikhwan in North.

Village is famous due to its ravines streets.It is renowned for its rich cultural heritage, agricultural activities, and the strength and bravery of its residents, particularly those belonging to the Mughal Gujjar Arain and bhatti and Ansari caste . Many people in Chabba Sindwan are considered descendants of Chugtai Khan, they are known as chugtai mughals the sardar of this clan is Abdurehman Mughal . He migrated from India since 1947 and settled in chabba sindhwan.he fought the second world war in 1939. He was a brave soldier and after is retirement he started agriculture in his village. He was passed away in 2015

The Mughals have had a dominant presence in Chabba Sindwan since 1947, and the village is recognized for its unique cultural and historical attributes.

== History ==
Chabba Sindhwan is an ancient village. According to the locals, the Armies of Hindus Rajas and Mughal Empire, destroyed the village, that’s why the streets of village are not strait. Some houses are on height and some are on lower. Before the partition of India, both Muslim and Sikh communities were living. Now, the majority of population is Muslim.

== Culture ==
Villagers follow the typical Punjabi Culture as well as modern western culture.

They spoke Punjabi Language, and can understand Urdu. They are mostly Mahajars.

== Economy ==
Economy of village is very strong, GDP per capita is about 25000 as per 2020. Most of villagers are farmers. They produced Wheat, Rice, Water Melon, and many of vegetables.

== Education ==
There is many Public and private sectors are spreading education in village.

Schools

- Govt. High School Chabba Sindhwan
- Govt. Girls High School Chabba Sindhwan
- There are also some Islamic Institutes playing a key role in education sector.

== Religions ==
There are 99.9% Muslims, and about 0.01% of Christians also living.

== Nearby villages ==
- Kot Ladha
- Nokhar
- Nadan Kot
- Jhallan
- Badoki Saikhwan

== See also ==
- Badoki Saikhwan
- Udhowali
- Kot Ladha
