= Kot Ladha =

Town and Union Council in Nowshera Virkan Tehsil

Kot Ladha کو‌‌ٹ‌لدھا
- Town
- Country: Pakistan
- Province: Punjab
- District: Gujranwala
- Tehsil: Nowshera Virkan

Government /Abdulbasit Jutt

Population
  - Estimate (2023): 6,500
- Time zone: UTC+05:00 (Pakistan Standard Time)
- Calling code: 055

Kot Ladha is a small town in Gujranwala district of Punjab, Pakistan. It is situated on the Gujranwala-Hafizabad road in Nowshera Virkan Tehsil.

== Geography ==
Kot Ladha is located in west of district Gujranwala, on Gujranwala Hafizabad road.

== Education ==
There are many Public and Private institutes are serving in village. Education system is modern but literacy rate is very low. Literacy rate is about 58%.

== Health system ==
There is a Rural Health Centre (RHC) Kot Ladha, in terms of provincial government health facilities. There are also some private clinics.

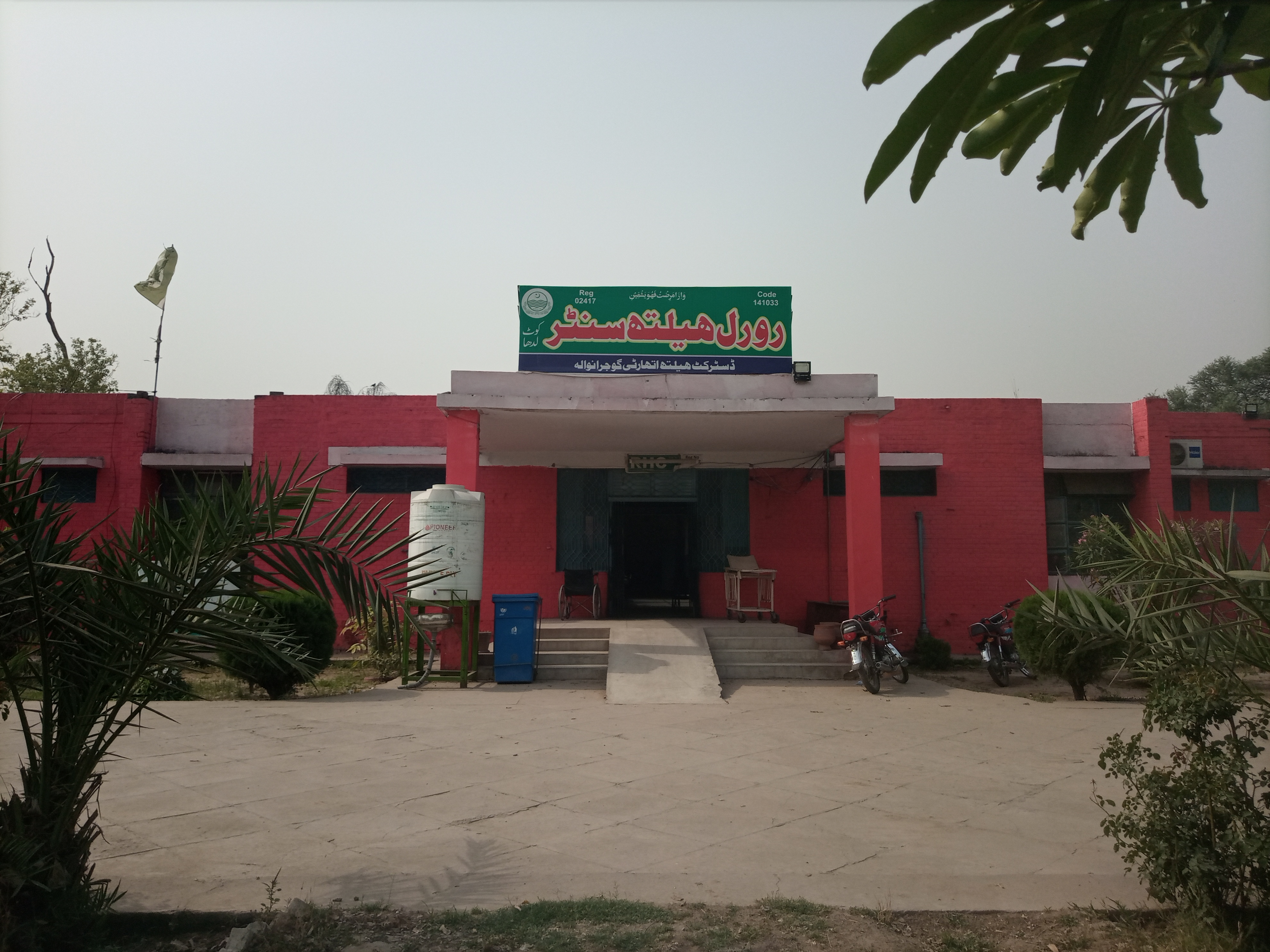
RHC Kot Ladha

== Nearby villages ==
- Badoki Saikhwan
- Chabba Sindhwan
- Dera Shah Jamal
- Nokhar

Ram garh Qila majha singh

== See also ==
- Badoki Saikhwan
- Nokhar
- Chabba Sindhwan
- Gujranwala
