= Buddha Goraya =

Village in Gujranwal District, Punjab, Pakistan

Buddha Goraya بڈھاگورائیہ
- Village
- Location of Buddha Goraya Naaee Buddha Goraya (Pakistan)
- Coordinates: 32°2′26″N 74°3′25″E
- Country: Pakistan
- Province: Punjab
- District: Gujranwala
- Tehsil: Nowshera Virkan Tehsil
- Number of Union Councils: 1

Area
  - Total: 1.9 sq mi (5 km^{2})

Population
  - Estimate (2017): 137,785
- Time zone: PST
  - Summer (DST): +5
- Postal code type: 52361
- Calling code: 055

Buddha Goraya / Budha Goraya / Budha Guraya (Urdu: بڈھاگورائیہ) is a town and union council in Nowshera Virkan Tehsil, Gujranwala District, Punjab, Pakistan.

== Etymology ==
'Buddha' means an 'old person' while 'Goraya' is a clan of the Jatt caste. Originally, this word was formed when some elderly herders of the Goraya or Jat caste grazed their herds on this land at a time where it was full of meadows. Travellers took this as a milestone and an indicator of the right direction of their travel, further they started calling them Buddhay Gorayan De (oldmen of Goraya caste). Now, this is shortened to 'Buddha Goraya'. Erstwhile, it was also called 'Rammalli Gorayan Di' which is also a composite of 'Rah' (passage), 'Malli' (occupied), 'Gorayan Di' (by the Gorayas), which makes the etymological development more authentic.

== History ==
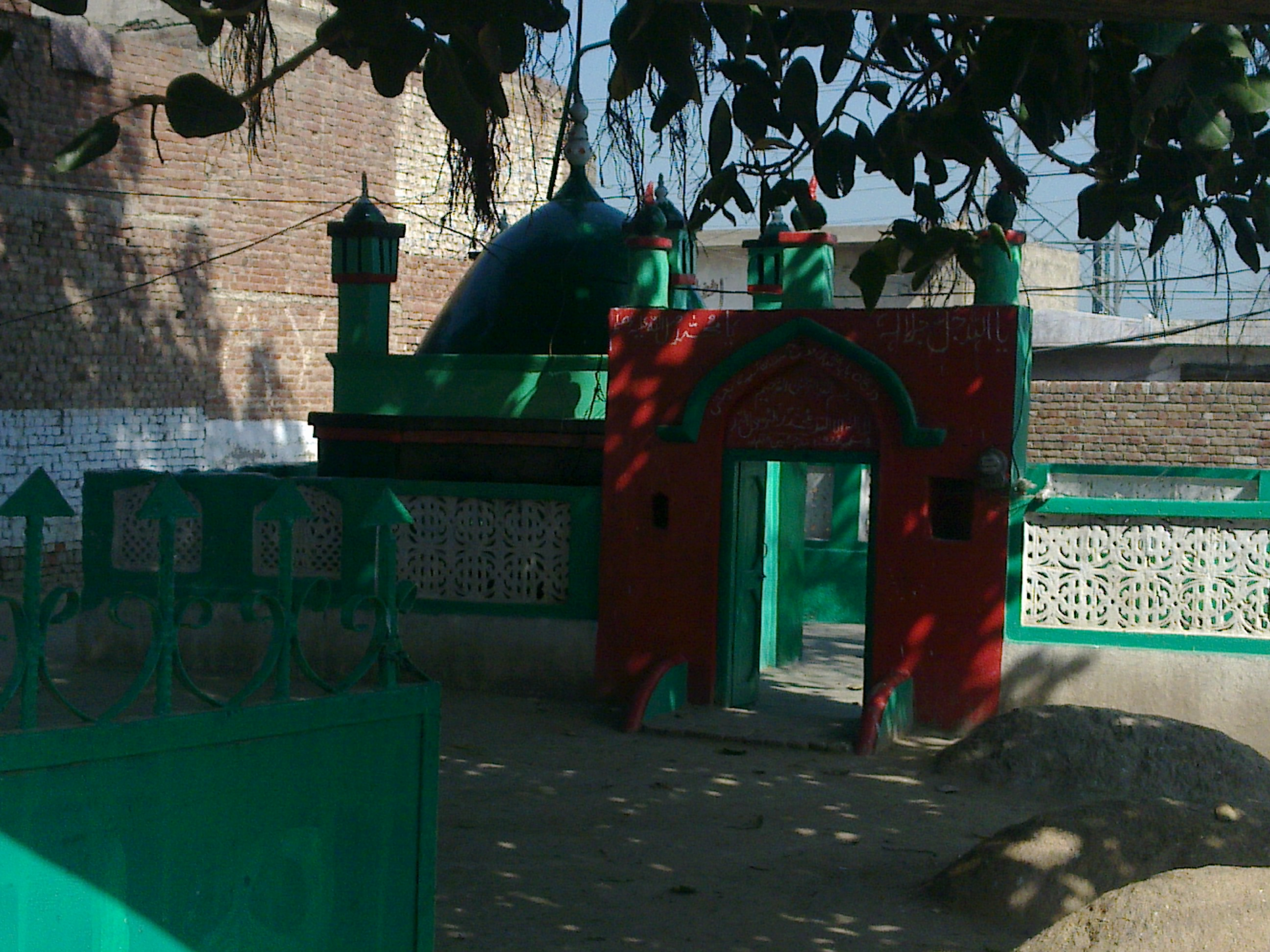
Shrine of Pir Madha Shah Sultan

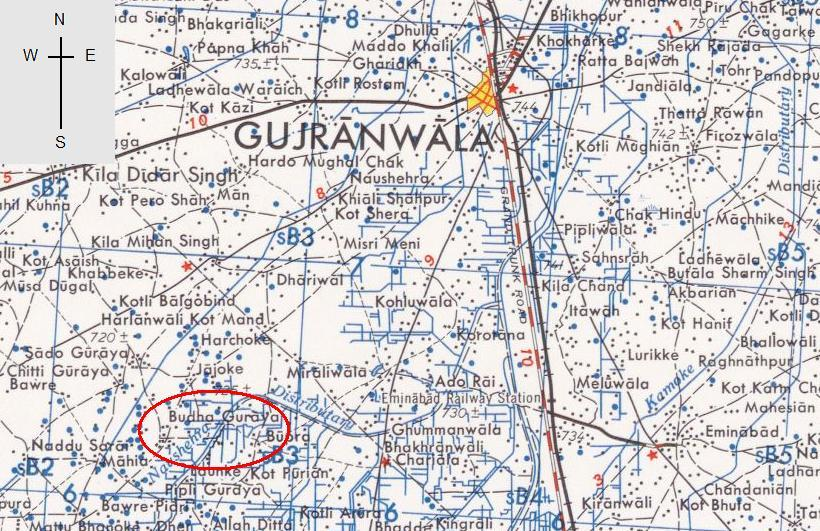
A 1955 U.S. Army topographic sheet reference of the Buddha Goraya

According to stories, the shrine of the Sufi saint Pir Madha Shah Sultan was built around 1700. There is also Peer Salam's shrine. Some families have been living here for centuries.

There is a bhirr (mound of earth, remnants of settlement) that is said to be a village destroyed by the earthquake, about 3 km (1.9 mi) south of Buddha Goraya. Now, this is used as a playground and also holds the graveyards of the villages of Dhair Virkan and Pipli Goraya. This destroyed village was the original village of the herders. After the destruction of the village, the surviving evacuees settled in the surroundings of this village in their possessed lands. These settlements are now called after their names, like Dera Ch. Javeed Akhtar Khan, Dera Ch Shoukat Goraya, Lonkay City, Dhair Virkan (first village of Virk Caste) Pipli Goraya, Saddu Goraya, Ratta Goraya, Chitti Goraya, Mahiya Goraya, Jajoki Goraya, Harchoki Goraya, Bupra Kalan Goraya, and Bupra Khurd Goraya. Kalan and Khurd were said to be brothers or cousins and were Hindus but when Sikhism flourished they converted to it. Sikhism was founded in the 15th century so it seems that this village has witnessed at least five centuries.

A village with the same name is also there in Sialkot district near Daska, which was also settled by one (perhaps who got married in Sialkot and decided to move there) of the same herders in memory of his relatives in this Buddha Goraya.

== Demographics ==
Its population is a blend of different religious sects and family clans. The majority are Muslim (Sunni 99.9% Shi'a 0.1%) whereas 5% of its total population is Christian; there is also a family of Ahmedis.

Other demographics include Rajput, mostly migrated from Talwandi Malak Patiala State (India), Jat local, Butt originally from Kashmir before partition, Dogar local, Kumhar or Rehmani local and some migrated, Shaikh or Qasab local, Mochi or Bhatti, Nai or Barber, Khokhar, Julaha and some others.

There is mostly harmony among all units but politically, there are some clashes and tussles.

== Geography and climate ==
Buddha Goraya in spring

Buddha Goraya is located at 32°2′26″N and 74°3′25″E (wikimapia). It is 228 m (748 ft) above sea level. It is 15 km (9.3 mi) from Gujranwala on recently built off-root of National Highway N-5 leading to Nowshera Virkan that is 12 km (7.5 mi) south of Buddha Goraya.

Its climate changes quite drastically throughout the year. The summer periods last from May through to September where the temperature reaches 40–42 degrees Celsius. The colder months are usually November to February. The temperature can drop to 5 degrees Celsius on average. The highest precipitation months are usually July and August when the monsoon season hits the Punjab province. In the other months, the average rainfall is about 25 millimetres (0.98 in). The driest months are usually November through April where little rainfall is seen.

Climate data for Buddha Goraya, Punjab, Pakistan
Month	Jan	Feb	Mar	Apr	May	Jun	Jul	Aug	Sep	Oct	Nov	Dec	Year
Mean daily maximum °F (°C)	71.6 (22.0)	75.2 (24.0)	84.2 (29.0)	96.8 (36.0)	107.6 (42.0)	113 (45)	107.6 (42.0)	102.2 (39.0)	100.4 (38.0)	95 (35)	84.2 (29.0)	75.2 (24.0)	92.8 (33.8)
Mean daily minimum °F (°C)	41 (5)	44.6 (7.0)	51.8 (11.0)	62.6 (17.0)	73.4 (23.0)	82.4 (28.0)	84.2 (29.0)	78.8 (26.0)	71.6 (22.0)	60.8 (16.0)	51.8 (11.0)	44.6 (7.0)	62.3 (16.8)
Source: "Meteoblue". Climate Budha Guraya. Meteoblue. 2019.

== Economy ==
Being an agricultural area, most of its economy consists of seasonal crops. These include wheat, rice, potatoes, sunflower, watermelon, melon, pears, and some other vegetables and fruits.

Inhabitants of this area also work in the industry and in the public sector.

Some other sources include the cottage industry that includes carpet weaving which is exported to foreign countries by the local agents who usually purchase these from the local workers. There are also some factories for elastic knitting (for multipurpose use, especially in garments).

Dairy farming is also one of the units of its economy. Although there is no dairy processing unit, the milk is sold in the local market and in Gujranwala.

== Culture ==
Gurudwara Khara Sahib (Chhevin Patshahi) at Mattu Bhai Ke near Buddha Goraya

Shrine of Pir Abdul Salaam Shah

This village has a Punjabi culture although its population belongs to different areas. All the migrants have adopted local trends and lifestyles.

With changing trends in the region, there is also a change in lifestyle. The traditional dhoti kurta and pagri are now being replaced with shalwar qameez and pant shirts.

== Education ==
The literacy rate of Buddha Goraya is 80%. Children are often sent to the city Gujranwala for education. There is the college in this region so that their children can easily get an education. It will also help them to save money. The person who has a great contribution in education of Buddha goraya is Sir Irfan Ali & Sir Umer Hayat.

A secondary level school for boys was built in 1967 while a primary level school was already there in 1947. The seat of the principal of BPS.19 is vacant since 2014. Ten secondary school teachers work here with ten ESTs and four PSTs. The school has a well-furnished computer lab working under Kamran Ali Vir SST (IT). A primary level school for girls was built in the 1970s that was later promoted to secondary level in the later 1980s. It was further promoted to higher secondary level in 2009, but classes started after seven years in 2016 due to lack of interest in education by local MPA and MNA.

A number of ex-students of this school work in high government posts.

Buddha Goraya Public Library was established by the efforts of M. Ajmal Khan, Head of Library Services, University of Dammam, Saudi Arabia, with a basic collection of over 2,000 books in the Urdu language. This will boost the literary environment given that locals are interested in visiting the library.
