= Maan, Punjab =

Maan
- Village
- Location within Pakistan
- Coordinates: 32.16°N 73.51°E
- Country: Pakistan
- Province: Punjab
- District: Gujranwala
- Established: 15th century
- Time zone: UTC+5 (PST)

Maan (Urdu: مان) is a sizable village in Gujranwala Tehsil of Gujranwala District, in Punjab, Pakistan. It was founded by the Sikh Mann Sardars of Mughalchak.

Hari Ram Gupta records that the traditions of the Mann chiefs of Mughalchak trace their origins to Laddha Singh, who is said to have founded the village of Maan during the late fifteenth century and became chaudhri of twenty-two villages, establishing the family's local influence.

Lepel Henry Griffin in the Chiefs of Punjab notes that four generations later, Nika Mann, is said to have expanded the terriroties and established the settlement of Nika Man. According to these traditions, Nika Man later lost the expanded territory to Mirza Kila, the governor of Eminabad. The Mann sardars subsequently reclaimed the expanded territory from Mirza Kila and re-named it Mughal Chak, which symbolically meant territory that used to belong to the Mughals.

It has a population of about 10,000 of which the Maans are in majority. Others include Rajputs that came from India at the time of partition, Butts and others workers class people. Most of worker class people migrated to Gujranwala.

== Surroundings ==
The village is surrounded by two historical forts, Qila Didar Singh and Qila Mian Singh.

There is one highway joining the village with Gujranwala and Hafizabad. Through this highway there is further three kilometer distance by horse carts and auto rickshaws to reach to village heart.

== Facilities ==
The village has

- A Post Office
- Hospital
- Girls Higher Secondary School
- Boys Middle School
- Girls Middle School

== Sources and income ==
The main source of income is agriculture. Most of the farmers cultivate Wheat in winter, Rice (Basmati rice) in summer and various vegetables in every season. Water source is just 60 feet below ground level and rich with sweet water. Village sewerage system is open channel drains going into 4 hector pound for evaporation of waste water. Farmers near pound use same waste water as fertilizing agent for crops which is enriched with urea.
