= Bhiri Shah Rahman =

Village in Punjab, Pakistan

Bhiri Kalan بھڑی کلاں Bhiri Shah Rehman
- Village
- Location of Bhiri Kalan Bhiri Kalan (Pakistan)
- Coordinates: 32.105°N 73.810°E
- Country: Pakistan
- Province: Punjab
- District: Gujranwala
- Tehsil: Nowshera Virkan
- Union council: Bhiri Kalan

Area
  - Total: 1.2 sq mi (3 km^{2})

Population
  - Estimate (2017): 9,500
- Time zone: UTC+05:00 (Pakistan Standard Time)
- Calling code: 055

Bhiri Shah Rahman is a village in Gujranwala District, Punjab, Pakistan. It is located 40 km west of Gujranwala city. The village is named after the tomb of Shah Abdul Rahman (d. 1115 A.H.). It is known as Darbar Shah Rahman, built around 1700.

Bhiri Shah Rahman consists of two merged villages Bhiri Kalan (Upper Bhiri) and Bhiri Khurd (Lower Bhiri). It is situated on Gujranwala District's boundary with Hafizabad District.
