= Hamboki =

Hamboki ہمبوکی
- Village
- Location within Pakistan
- Coordinates: 32.140656°N 73.902732°E
- Country: Pakistan
- Province: Punjab

Population (2020)
  - Total: 4,000
- Time zone: UTC+5 (PST)

Hamboki is a large village, in Nowshera Virkan Tehsil of Gujranwala District, Punjab, Pakistan. It is situated 33 km west from Gujranwala city.

== Geography ==
The village is located in the west of district Gujranwala, on Nokhar to Alipur road. It is connected to the nearby town of Qila Didar Singh. Its coordinates are 31.6896° N, 75.2377°E.

- East : Philloki, Nurpur
- West : Badoki Saikhwan, Udhowali
- South : Nokhar
- North: Bakhshish Pura

== History ==
In the 18th century, the village was a part of late destroyed city Maka. Now Maka is also a small village, Makewali and Hamboki is a separated village having much population. Peoples are confused by the origin of name Hamboki.There used to be an old man Pir Syed Munawar Hussain Shah in Hamboki, he was harassed by the Sikhs and accused him very badly, as a result of which he cursed the whole village, due to which this maka village was destroyed.

There are some buildings having origin from British Rule.

== Education ==
The education system of Village is good but literacy rate is very low. There are many Public and Private institutes in village. The literacy rate is about 59%.

Schools

- Govt. Elementary School, Hamboki

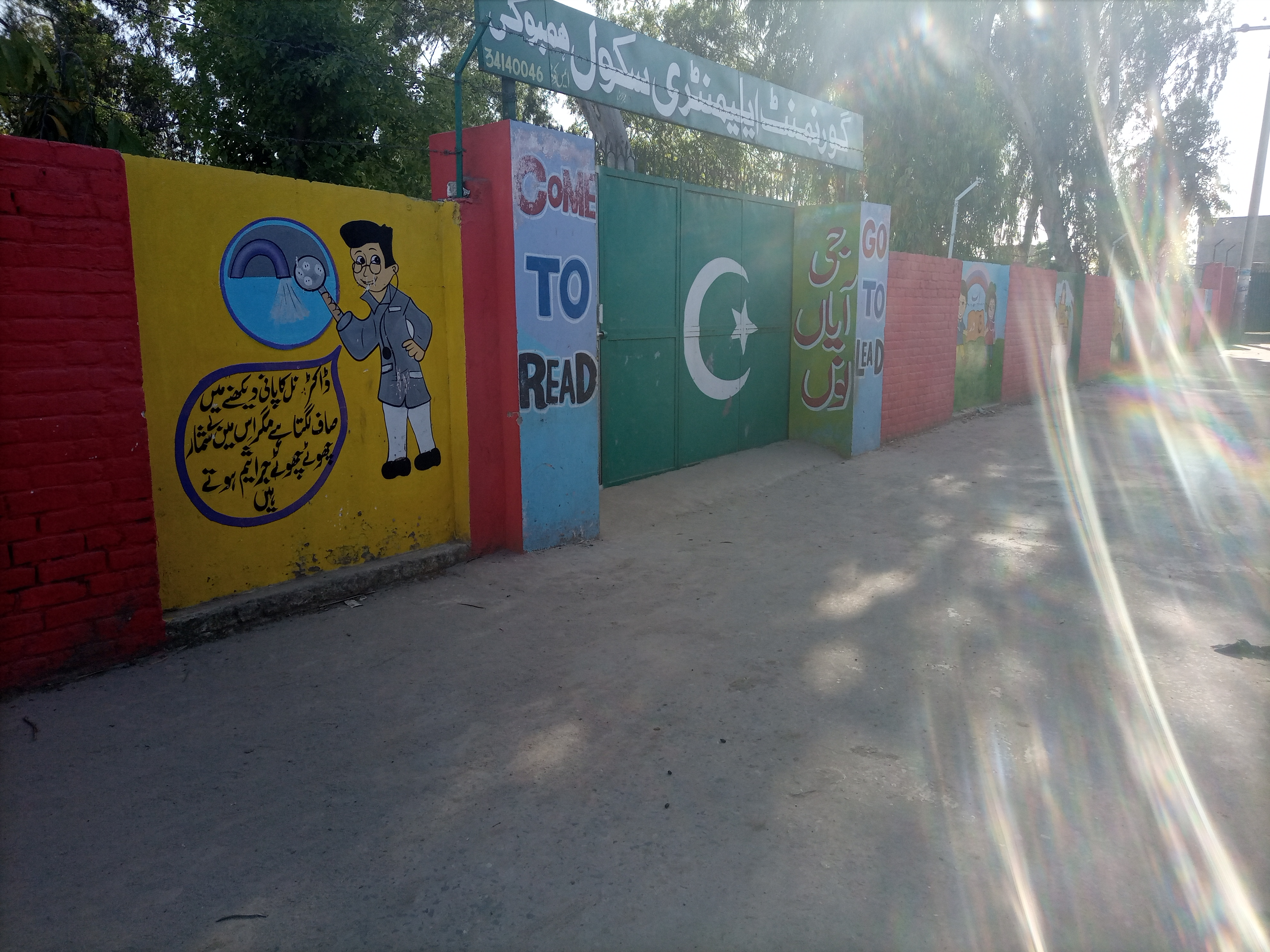

- Govt. Primary School Hamboki.
- Alfatah Academy
- Rahman Public School
- Subhan Ideal School System

== Facilities ==
The village streets are paved. Gas and electricity are available. There is no Rural Health Centre in the village although there are some private clinics. There are two fuel stations in the village.

== Economy ==
GDP per capita is 20000 PKR. Agriculture is one of main occupation of villagers.

== Nearby villages ==
- Udhowali
- Badoki Saikhwan
- Nokhar
- Philloki

== See also ==
- Badoki Saikhwan
- Udhowali
- Nokhar
- Qila Didar Singh
