= Badoki Saikhwan =

Pakistani village

Badoki Saikhwan بدوکی‌سیکھواں
- Village
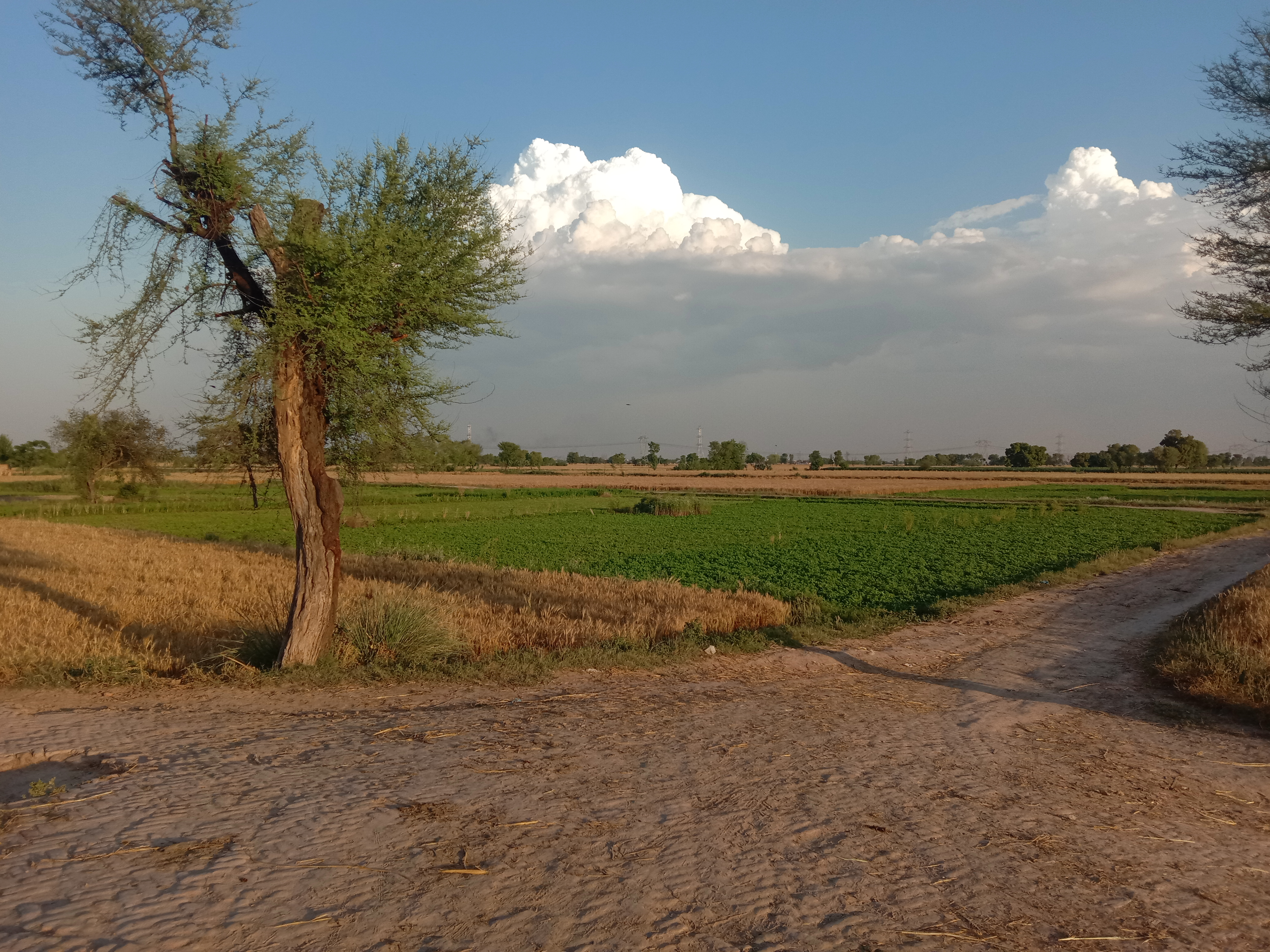
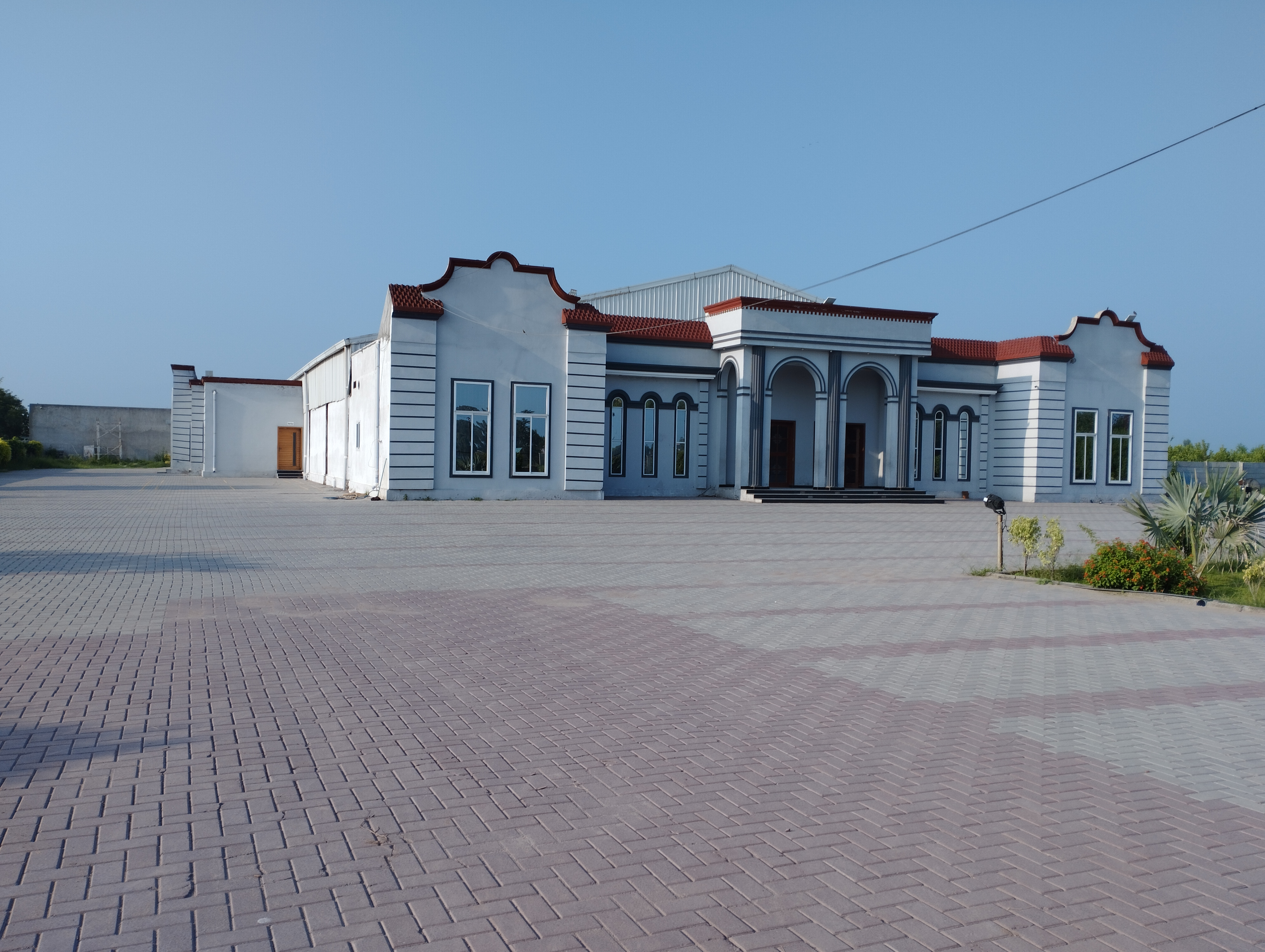
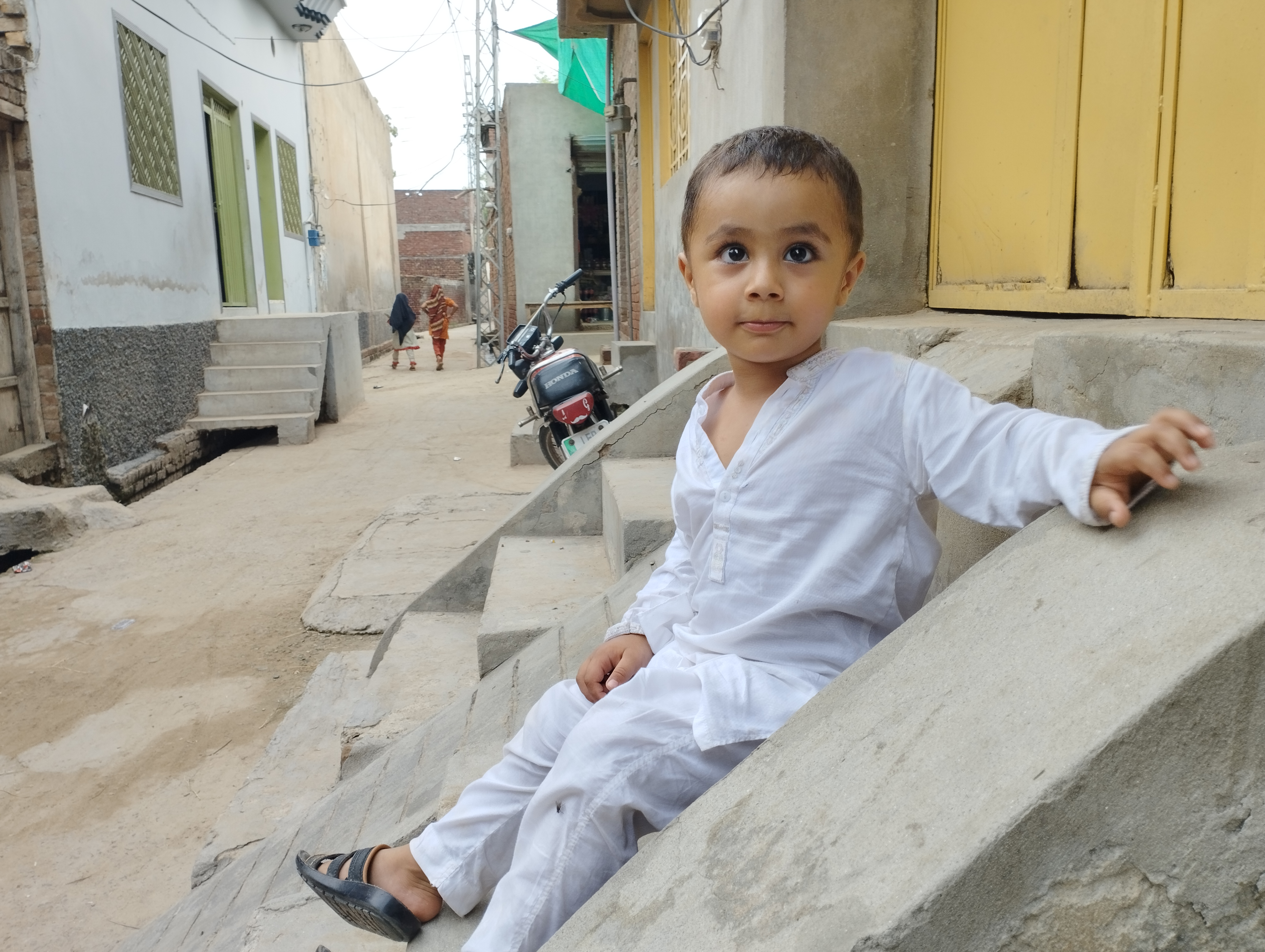
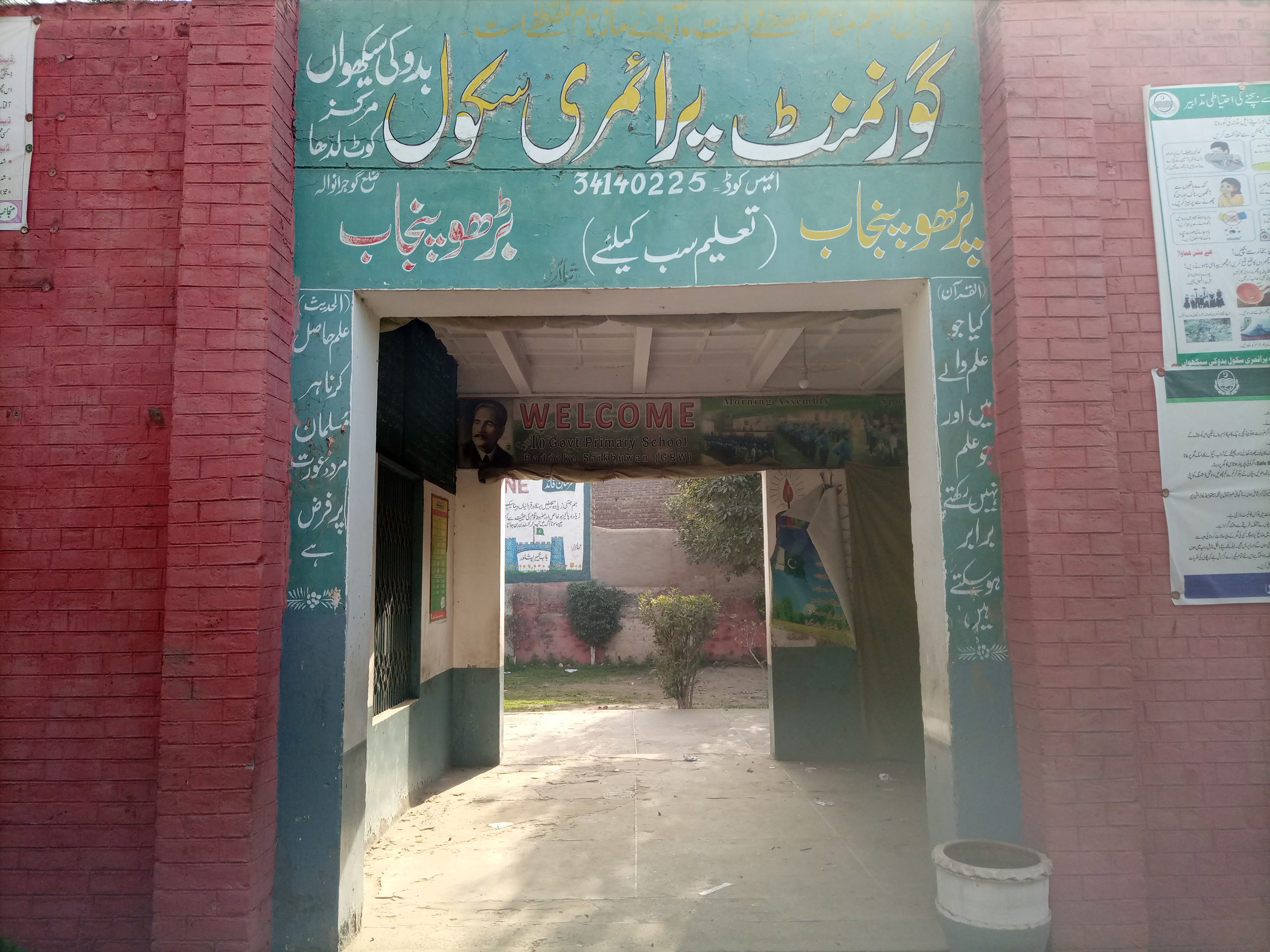
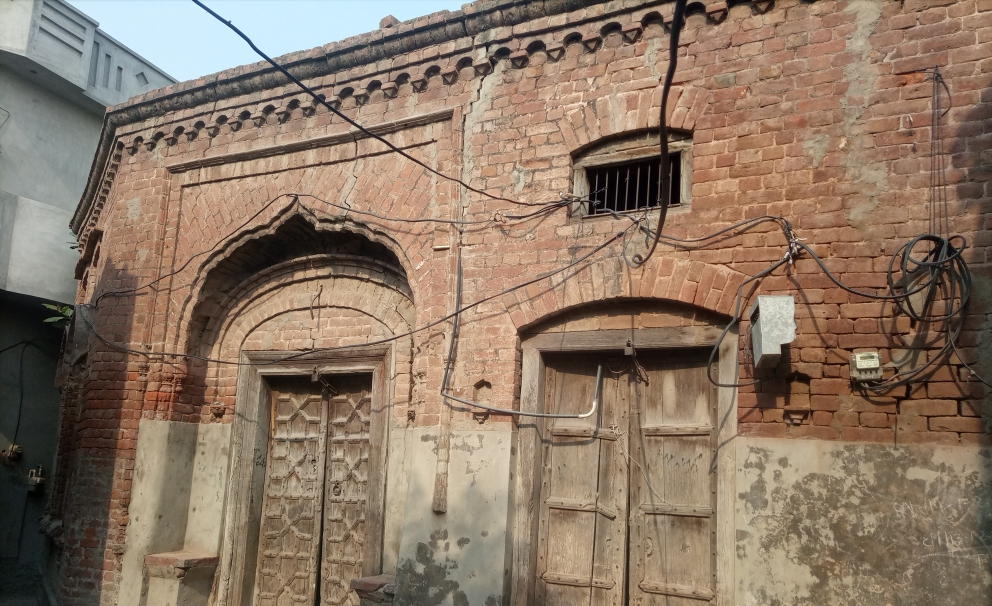
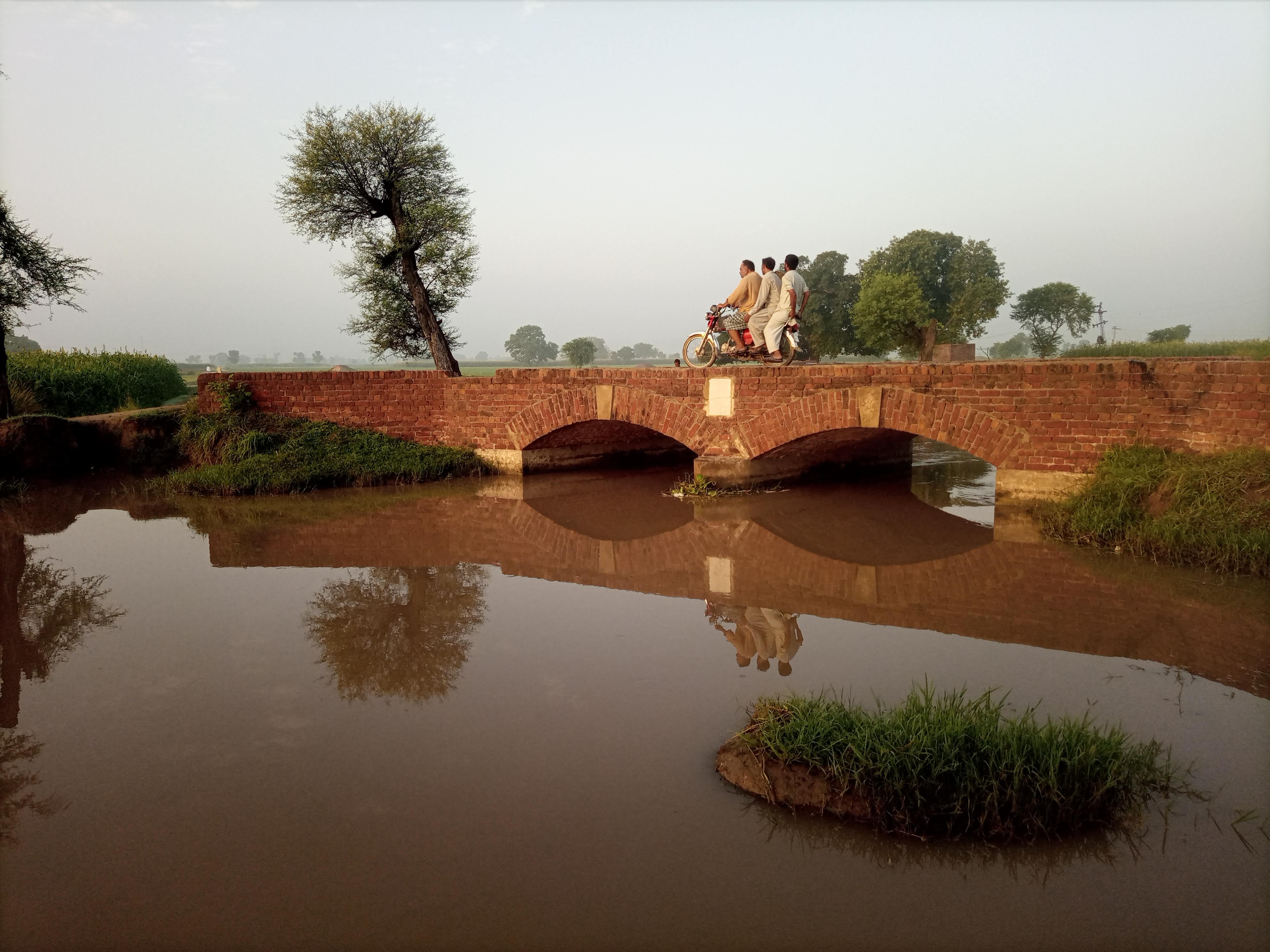
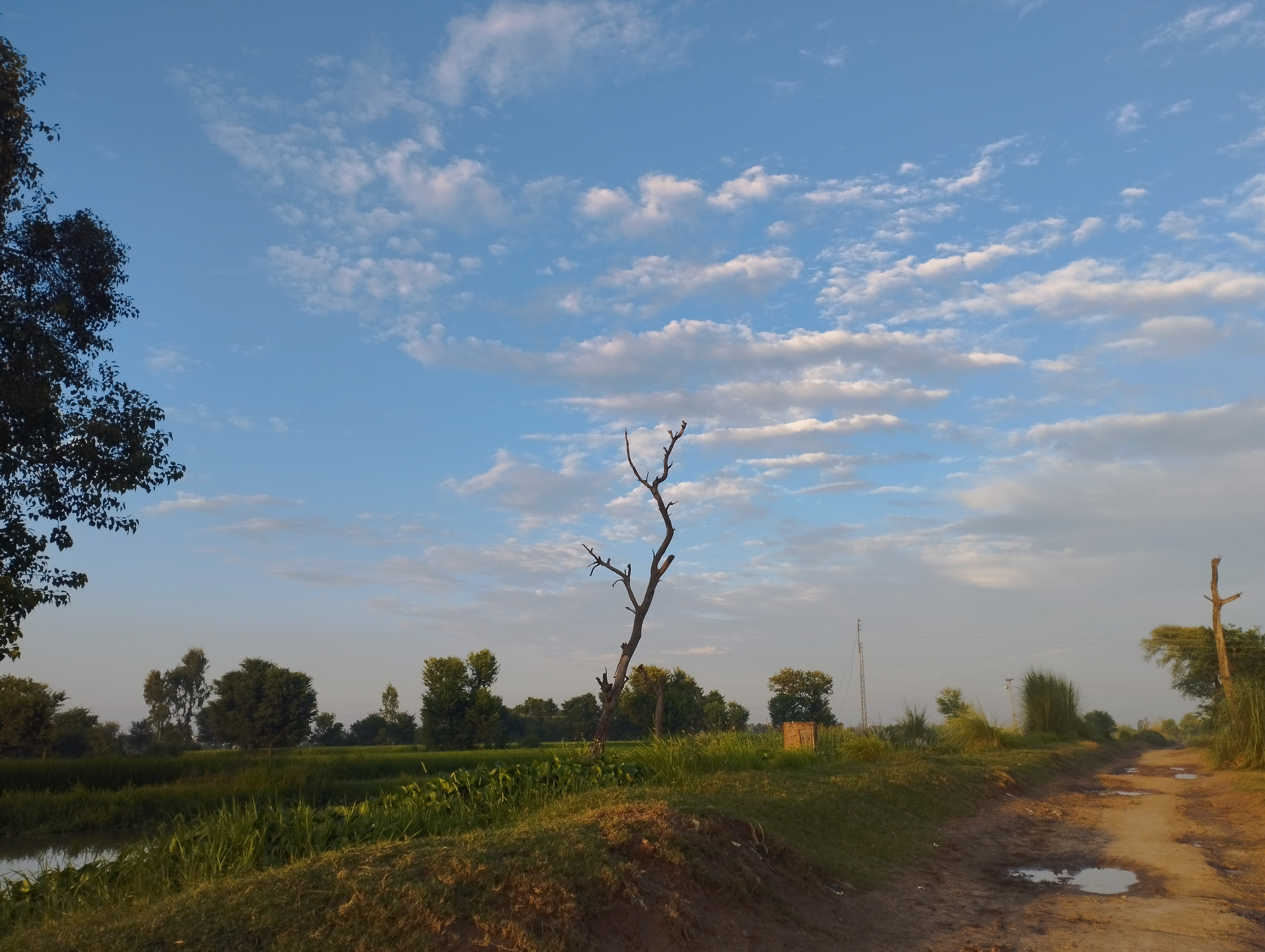
- Badoki Saikhwan Al-Madina Palace Marquee Street View Primary School Old Building Canal View View of Village
- Nicknames: Baddoki, Baddoki Sharif
- Location within Pakistan Location within Punjab, Pakistan
- Coordinates: 32.1340°N 73.8918°E
- Country: Pakistan
- Province: (Punjab, Pakistan) Punjab
- District: Gujranwala
- Tehsil: Nowshera Virkan

Population (2021)
  - Total: 3,000
- Time zone: UTC+5 (PST)
- Calling code: 055

Badoki Saikhwan or Baddoki Seikhwan ( Urdu :بدوکی‌سیکھواں) is a village in Tehsil Nowshera Virkan, District Gujranwala, Punjab, Pakistan. It has historical remnants of the Mughal Empire and the Sikh Empire. It is located at 32°8' N 74°1' E, west of Gujranwala, the district capital. Its population was estimated to be 2,500 in December 2020. It lies near the Gujranwala-Hafizabad road, 35 km west of Gujranwala city.

== History ==
Baddoki Saikhwan is a historically significant village of Gujranwala District. It is often locally referred to as Badoki. It was home to Muslims, Sikhs and Hindus before the Partition of India. In 1947, several Sikh and Hindu families migrated from Baddoki Saikhwan to India and similarly from India several Muslim families migrated to the village.

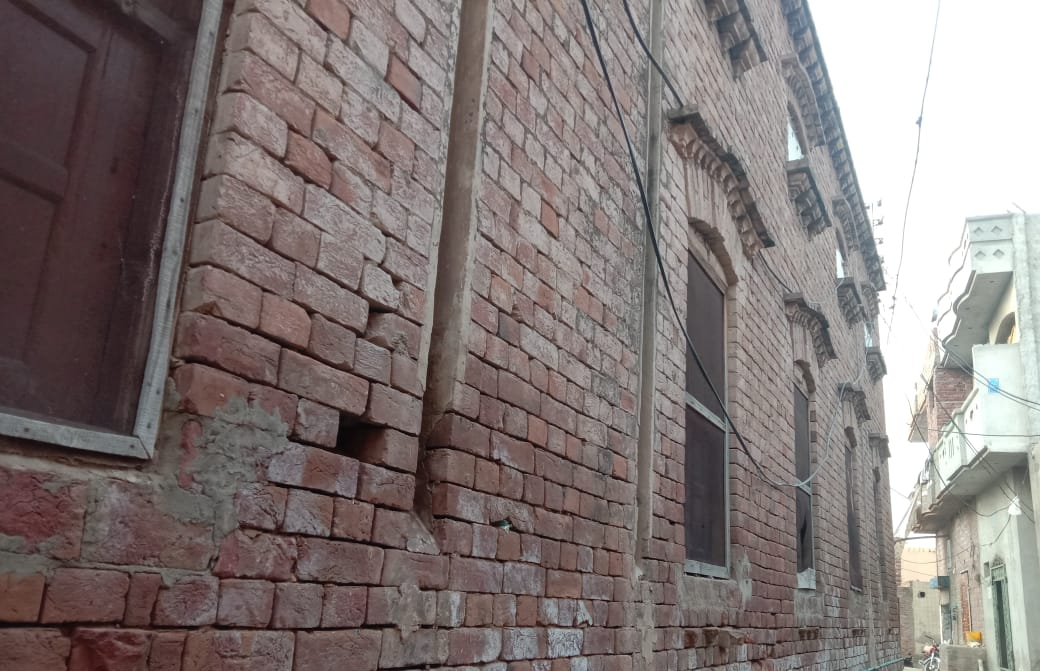
Madrassa Jamal Ul Quran Ysufia

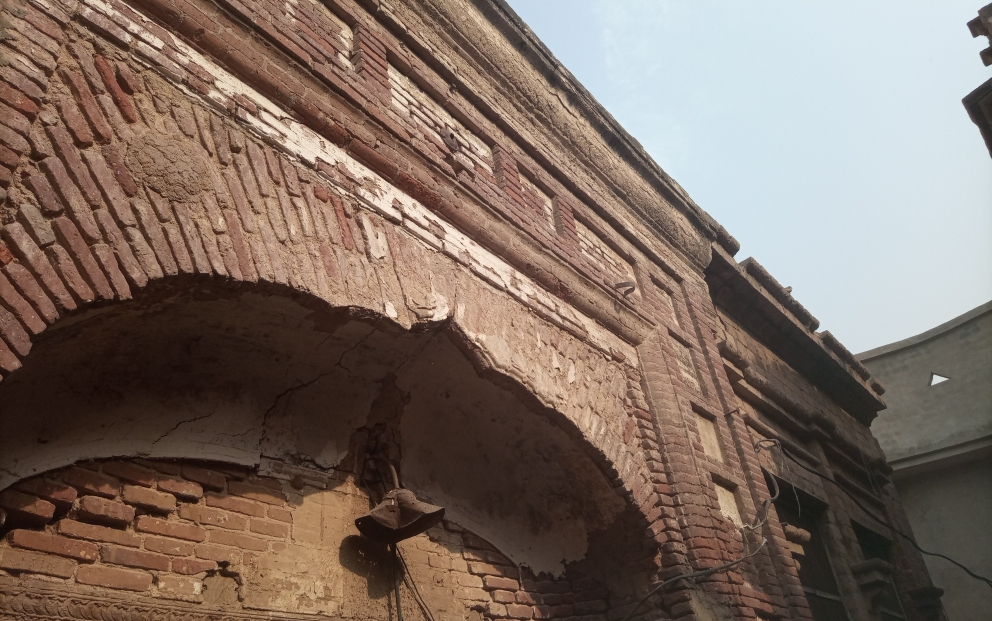
Old Building In Badoki

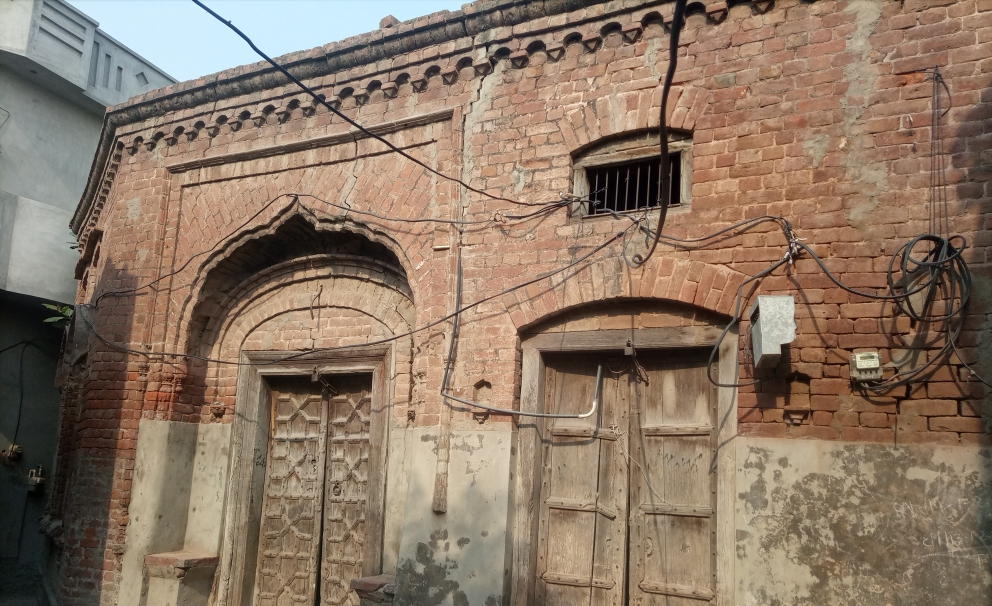
Old House In Badoki

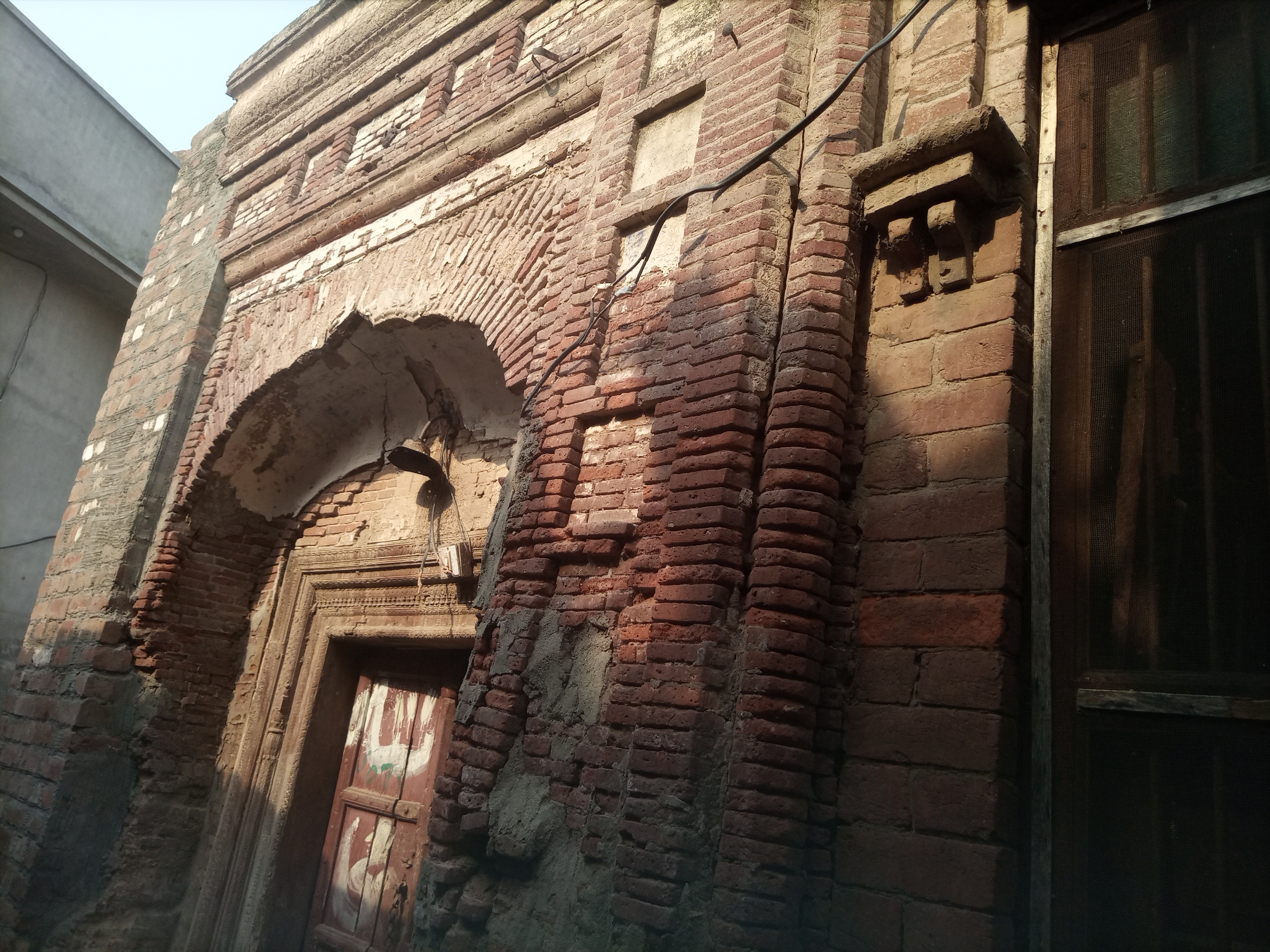
Mughal Era House In Badoki

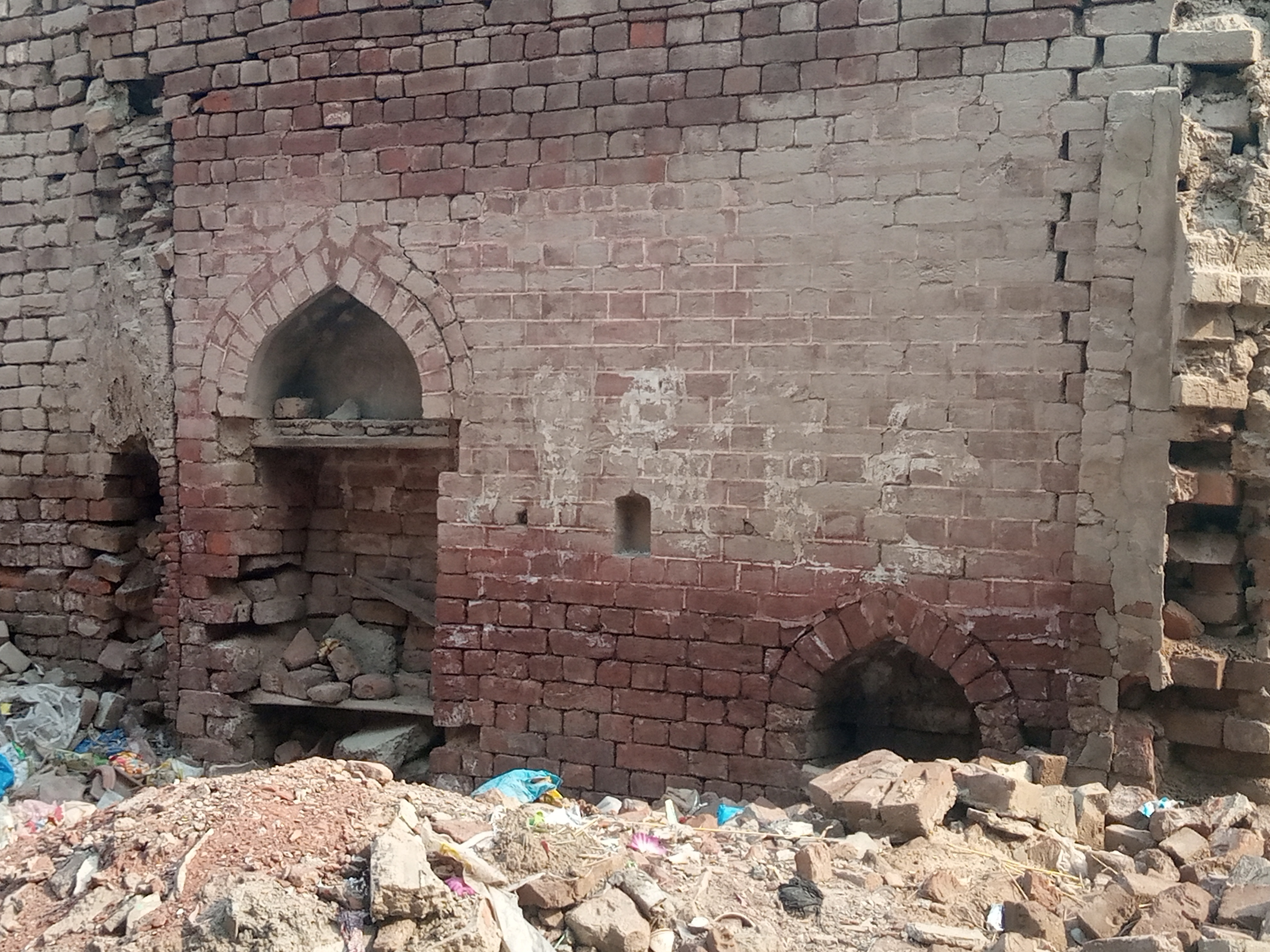
Destroyed Old Building

== Education ==
There are many madaras and schools in the village. Literacy rate of village is 58%.

Madaras

- Madrass Jamal-ul-Qur'an Yusufia (Men's)
- Madrass Talim-ul-Qur'an (Men's)
- Madrassa Hazrat Khadija R.A (Women's)
- Madrassa Aysha Siddiqa R.A (Women's)

Schools

- Govt. Primary School Badoki Saikhwan (For Boys)
- Govt. Girls High School Badoki Saikhwan (For Girls)
- Unique Islamic School System Badoki (Co-Edu)
- Learning Kingdom Girls Academy (Girls)
- Alhamd Study Center(Boys)

== Religion ==
The major religion of the village is Islam. There are also some Christian families.

Mosques

- Jama Masjid Nur Badoki
- Jama Masjid Haji Ramzan Wali
- Jama Masjid Maryam
- Sultan-e-Madina Mosque
- Jama Masjid Siddiq-e-Akbar

Church

- Church Of All Saints

== Economy ==
The economy of the village is not very strong. GDP per capita is about 11000 PKR. Agriculture is the main vocation of most of the villagers and many people work hard for their livelihood. Most of the paddy and wheat crops are grown in the village. Watermelons and vegetables have also been growing for the past few years. The village has a number of guava orchards.

== Facilities ==
All the streets of the village are paved. There is electricity as well as gas facility. The village has a primary school for boys and a high school for girls.

== Bakeries ==
There are four bakeries in the village. These bakeries were the source of income for some villagers during COVID-19.

== Transportation ==
The village is linked with Gujranwala-Hafizabad road, through Alipu-Nokhar Road. its also connected to a town Qila Didar Singh by shortcut road.

== Nearby villages ==
- Udhowali
- Hamboki
- Kot Ladha
- Phokar Pur
- Philloki
- Chabba Sindhwan
- Noian Wala

== See also ==
- Qila Didar Singh
- Nowshera Virkan
- Gujranwala
- Noian Wala
- Chabba Sindhwan
- Hamboki
