= Nokhar =

Town in Gujranwala District, Punjab, Pakistan

Nokhar نوکھر
- Town
- Interactive map of Nokhar
- Coordinates: 32.111751°N 73.927032°E
- Country: Pakistan
- Region: Punjab
- District: Gujranwala District
- Capital: Nokhar
- Villages: 12

Population (2017 Census of Pakistan)
  - Total: 25,000
- Time zone: UTC+5 (PST)
  - Summer (DST): UTC+6 (PDT)
- Area code: 0556

Nokhar is a village town and Union Council in Tehsil Nowshera Virkan, Gujranwala District, Punjab province, Pakistan.

Nokhar village is located 18 km from Nowshera Virkan and 33 km from Gujranwala on Gujranwala-Hafizabad Road. The distance of Hafizabad from Nokhar is 20 km and Alipur Chattha is 22 km away. Majority of Population belongs to Jatt Saikhu.

== See also ==
- Badoki Saikhwan
- Qila Didar Singh
- Hamboki
- Gujranwala
