= Qila Mihan Singh =

- Location within Pakistan
- Coordinates: 32.06°N 74.05°E
- Country: Pakistan
- Province: Punjab
- District: Gujranwala
- Elevation: 222 m (728 ft)
- Time zone: UTC+5 (PST)

Qila Mihan Singh is a town of Gujranwala District in the Punjab province of Pakistan. It was established by the Sikh Mann Sardars of Mughalchak. It is located at 32.06°N 74.05°E at 222 metres (731 feet) above sea level. The town is named after Mihan Singh, a former Sikh governor of Kashmir, who is believed to have established the town.
