= Qila Didar Singh =

Town in District Gujranwala, Province Punjab, Pakistan

- Town
- Qila Didar Singh
- Location within Pakistan
- Coordinates: 32.1363°N 74.0147°E
- Country: Pakistan
- Province: Punjab
- Founder: Didar Singh Sandhu

Population (2023)
  - Total: 74,523
- Time zone: UTC+5 (PST)

Qila Didar Singh (Urdu: قلعہ دِيدار سِنگھ) is a historic town of Gujranwala District, in the Punjab province of Pakistan. Its population was estimated to be 66,491 in 2017. Qila Didar Singh lies on the Gujranwala-Hafizabad Road, 17 km west of Gujranwala. The town's rice market is one of the largest in Punjab. In 2007, Qila Didar Singh was administratively upgraded to City Town, one of four in Gujranwala District.

== History ==
This town was established in the 1790s by the Sikh Mann Sardars of Mughalchak. An alternative view is that it was established in the mid-1700s by a Sandhu Jatt Sikh. When Didar Singh was married, his father gave him the lands surrounding the part of Qila Didar Singh that is currently known as "Old/Interior part of Qila". The name Qila implies a fort; this name originated in the fact that Didar Singh's family had a very large and tall mansion, which was surrounded by smaller houses. Because there was a wall surrounding the whole town with several gates, the town had the appearance of a fort.

During the Indian rebellion of 1857, British troops chasing the rebels arrived at the Qila and surrounded it, believing it to be a fort. Representatives of the townspeople however managed to convince the troops that the town was not in fact a fortification.

In 1947, the year of Pakistan's creation, Qila Didar Singh was a very small town with mainly Sikh and Hindu population. Most of the Sikhs and Hindus living in the town moved to the Indian part of the Punjab and many Muslim immigrants from East Punjab and Haryana moved to the area. There are two canals in Qila Didar Singh knows as Barri Nehar and Chhoti Nehar

== Demographics ==
Population

Historical population
Year	Pop.	±%
1972	15,667	—
1981	25,422	+62.3%
1998	41,404	+62.9%
2017	66,491	+60.6%
2023	74,523	+12.1%

According to the 2023 Census of Pakistan, the population of Qila Dīdār Singh reached 74,523, up from 66,491 recorded during the 2017 Census. Between 2017 and 2023, the city registered an annual population growth rate of 1.9%. The 2023 demographic structure reflects a gender distribution of 37,191 males (49.9%) and 37,329 females (50.1%).

== Source of income ==
Due to fertile soil of the surrounding area, agriculture is the economic backbone of Qila Didar Singh; the main cash crops being rice in the summer and wheat in winter. Qila Didar Singh is Educational hub for locals and surrounding villages. Most people from Qila Didar Singh are self employed, have their own business because of very big rice market and lot of customer for other commodities also come from the surrounding villages. There are government employees, private employees and factory workers. There has been considerable migration from the area to other countries. Even in the British Colonial days, many local tailors became contractors of the army to supply uniforms and shoes. Many of them settled in Cyprus and Singapore. They brought prosperity to the town. Residents of Qila Didar Singh are not farmers but people living in villages around Qila Didar Singh earn their living from rice and wheat fields. A couple of hundred people from Qila Didar Singh commute to Gujranwala daily for labour or to do technical jobs in various small industries in the city. Leaving their families at home, many others work in different parts of Pakistan for their living.

== See also ==
- Badoki Saikhwan
- Udhowali
- Hamboki
- Nokhar
- Qila DEO
