= Udhowali =

Zaildara Da Pind
- Village
- Udhowali
- Location within Pakistan
- Coordinates: 32.16°N 73.51°E
- Country: Pakistan
- Province: Punjab
- District: Gujranwala

Population (2021)
  - Estimate: 5,000
  - Density: 70/km^{2} (180/sq mi)
- Time zone: UTC+5 (PST)

Udhowali (Urdu : ادھووالی) is a village located in Tehsil Nowshera Virkan, Gujranwala District, Punjab, Pakistan. It lies on the Nokhar-Alipur road, 36 km west from Gujranwala. It is a Union Council of Nowshera Virkan.

Udhowali Was Recognised In The Area By The Name Of Ch Iqbal Zaildar But As The Newer People They Started To Recognise It By The Name Of Ch Iqbal Zaildar Saab And By The Name Of His Elder Son Ch Hassan Zaildar Chairman Union Council Udhowali As Per Now It Is Recognised By The Names Of Ch Iqbal Marhoom’s Sons Previously Mentioned Ch Hassan Zaildar And His Younger Son Ch Mohsin Zaildar

== History ==
Udhowali is a historical village like Badoki Saikhwan. There are many modern buildings as well as Mughal Empire buildings founded. The village was the home of Muslims and Sikhs before the Partition of India.

== Education ==
The education system of Village is very impressive. There is a College, High School, primary Schools and other Private sector spreading Education in whole area. There are also some Madaras in village, to educate the Islamic learnings.

College

- Govt. Degree College Udhowali since 2014

Schools

- Govt. High School Udhowali since 1930
- Govt Primary School Udhowali since 1920
- Govt. Girls Primary School Udhowali
- The Oriel English School Udhowali.
- Learning Kingdom Girls College Udhowali
- Concise Public Institution Udhowali

Madaras

- Jamia Noumania Udhowali

== See also ==
- Nowshera Virkan
- Badoki Saikhwan
- Gujranwala
