= Lepel Griffin =

British administrator and diplomat (1838–1908)

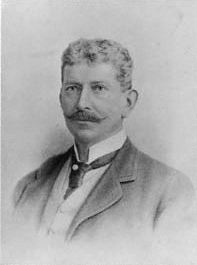
Sir Lepel Henry Griffin

Sir Lepel Henry Griffin, KCSI (20 July 1838 – 9 March 1908) was a British administrator and diplomat during the British Raj period in India. He was also a writer.

== Early life ==
Lepel Henry Griffin was born in Watford, England on 20 July 1838. His father, Henry, was a clergyman in the Church of England and his mother was Frances Sophia. His mother had been married previously and thus Griffin had ten half-siblings as well as two full sisters.

Griffin was educated briefly at Harrow School, having also attended Malden's Preparatory School, Brighton. He did not go to university but was privately tutored for the competitive examination for entry to the Indian Civil Service. He sat and passed those examinations during 1859 and 1860, being ranked tenth among the 32 successful candidates.

== Career ==
He reached India in November 1860 and was posted to Lahore. The mannerisms of Griffin had attracted attention in India from the time of his arrival there, and in 1875 Sir Henry Cunningham satirised him in the novel, Chronicles of Dustypore, in which he was depicted as the character Desvoeux. Katherine Prior, the author of his entry in the Oxford Dictionary of National Biography, describes that, "He was a dandyish, Byronic figure, articulate, argumentative, and witty. Anglo-Indian society was at once both dazzled by and scornful of his languid foppishness and irreverent tongue".

In 1880 he became Chief Secretary of the Punjab. He was sent as a diplomatic representative to Kabul, at the end of the Second Afghan War. He was then Governor-General's Agent in Central India and Resident in Indore; and Resident in Hyderabad.

He collaborated with the pioneer Indian photographer Lala Deen Dayal.

After his return to the United Kingdom, he was Chairman of the East India Association. He was also for several years a Chairman of the Imperial Bank of Persia, and in late 1902 received the Grand Cross of the Order of the Lion and the Sun from the Shah of Persia.

He was a proponent of an Anglo-American union, he addressed a meeting on 15 October 1898 in Luton, on the subject of the suggested Anglo-American union, Col. John Hay, the former United States Ambassador at London attended the meeting.

== Death ==
Griffin died at his home – 4 Cadogan Gardens, Sloane Street, London – on 9 March 1908 after suffering from influenza. He was cremated and his ashes were interred at a private chapel owned by Colonel Dudley Sampson in Buxhalls, Haywards Heath, Sussex. His wife remarried, while the younger of his two sons, Sir Lancelot Cecil Lepel Griffin became the last political secretary of British India.

== Bibliography ==
- The Panjab Chiefs. Lahore: T. C. McCartney-Chronicle Press. 1865.
  - The Panjab Chiefs. Vol. 1. Updated by Charles Francis Massy (New revised ed.). Lahore: Civil and Military Gazette Press. 1890.
  - The Panjab Chiefs. Vol. 2. Updated by Charles Francis Massy (New revised ed.). Lahore: Civil and Military Gazette Press. 1890.
    - Revised as Chiefs and Families of note in the Punjab (1909)
- The Law of Inheritance to Chiefships. Lahore: Punjab Printing Company. 1869.
- The Rajas of the Punjab (1873)
- Famous monuments of Central India (1886)
- The Great Republic (Second ed.). London: Chapman and Hall. 1884.
- Ranjit Singh. Rulers of India series. Oxford: Clarendon Press. 1892.
