= Kamoke =

Kamoke کامونکی (Urdu)
- City
- Kamoke
- Municipal Committee logo
- Nicknames: The City of Rice & The City of Mosques
- Location in Punjab, Pakistan Kamoke (Pakistan)
- Coordinates: 31°58′25″N 74°13′22″E
- Country: Pakistan
- Province: Punjab
- District: Gujranwala
- Tehsil: Kamoke
- Founded in: 1600-1700 (AD)

Government
  - Type: Municipal Committee
  - Member of National Assembly (MNA): Chaudhary Zulfiqar Bhindar
  - Member of Provincial Assembly (MPA): Chaudhry Akhtar Ali Khan
  - Chief Officer (CO): Miss Sofia Ashiq
  - President Markazi Anjuman Tajran Kamoke: Ch Ahtesham Mustafa Khokhar

Area
  - City: 30.9 km^{2} (11.9 sq mi)
  - Metro: 450 km^{2} (170 sq mi)
- Elevation: 201 m (659 ft)

Population (2023)
  - City: 292,023
  - Rank: 32nd in Pakistan
  - Density: 9,450/km^{2} (24,500/sq mi)
- Time zone: UTC+5 (PST)
- Postal Code: 52470
- Area code: 055
- Website: MC Kamoke

Kamoke (Urdu: کامونکی) is a city in Gujranwala District, Punjab, Pakistan. It ranks as the 30th most populous city in Pakistan with a population of 292,023, according to the 2023 census. Kamoke is known for its prominent rice market, being one of the largest in the sub-continent, and for its numerous mosques.

== Demographics ==
Population

Historical population

Year	Pop.	±% p.a.
1951	15,558	—
1961	25,124	+4.91%
1972	50,257	+6.51%
1981	71,097	+3.93%

Year	Pop.	±% p.a.
1998	152,288	+4.58%
2017	249,767	+2.64%
2023	292,023	+2.64%

According to 2023 census, Kamoke had a population of 292,023.

Languages

Languages of Kamoke city (2023)
1. Punjabi (96.8%)
2. Urdu (2.60%)
3. Others (0.60%)
