= Nowshera Virkan Tehsil =

Nowshera Virkan Tehsil تحصیل نوشہرہ ورکاں
- Tehsil
- Interactive map of Nowshera Virkan Tehsil
- Country: Pakistan
- Region: (Punjab, Pakistan) Punjab
- District: Gujranwala
- Established: 14-08-1947

Government
  - Member National Assembly NA-84: MNA Azhar Qayyum Nahra (PML-N)

Area
  - Tehsil: 678 km^{2} (262 sq mi)

Population (2023)
  - Tehsil: 640,780
  - Density: 945/km^{2} (2,450/sq mi)
  - Urban: 59,639 (9.31%)
  - Rural: 581,141
- Time zone: UTC+5 (PST)
  - Summer (DST): UTC+6 (PDT)
- Postal code: 52370
- Area code: 055

Nowshera Virkan (Urdu: نوشہره وِركاں) is a town and tehsil situated to the west of the industrial city of Gujranwala, in Punjab, Pakistan. Nowshera Virkan is a hub of rice-growing villages.

== History ==
Nowshera Virkan has been a center of political activities from its earliest days. It was dominated by Arain, Rajput, Jutt, Arain, and Syed families. It is located in the Gujranwala District and is one of the largest of the four tehsils (administrative divisions). It lies between three large cities: Gujranwala, Hafizabad, and Sheikhupura. The dominant surnames of the Nowshera Virkan people are from military castes, including Arain, Bhuttah, Maan, Rajput, Virk, Syed and Goraya clans.

=== Elections ===
Ijaz Khan was among the known leaders of this region. He was elected four times as a Member of the National Assembly (MNA) from this region and was affiliated with the Pakistan Muslim League (N). After his death, his son Chaudhry Bilal Ijaz was elected MNA at age 25 in 2002 from Pakistan Muslim League (Q), defeating Hamid Nasir Chattha. Later in 2008, Mudassir Qayyum Nahra, a Member of the Provincial Assembly (MPA) from PP-102 in 2002–2008, won the seat, but was disqualified and jailed in 2010 for submitting a forged academic certificate. In the 2010 by-elections, Chaudry Tussadiq Masud Khan (Pakistan Peoples Party), a member of the Rajput clan, was elected MNA. In 2013 and 2018, Azhar Qayyum Nahra (PMLN), brother of Mudassir Nahra, won the seat, due to PMLN's overall stronghold in Gujranwala region. Bilal Ijaz contested both 2013 and 2018 elections on Pakistan Tehreek-e-Insaf (PTI) ticket but was unsuccessful. The Nahra family is facing charges from the National Accountability Bureau (NAB) for having assets disproportionate to their known sources of income. In the 2024 elections, Bilal Ijaz defeated Azhar Qayyum Nahra, on a PTI ticket.

== Towns ==
Nowshera Virkan Tehsil has many small towns such as Chak Dhoni Chand, Garmula Virkan, Jago Wala New, Fateh ki, Phamma Sraa, Tatlay Aali, Nokhar, Kot Ladha, Jalhan, Bhiri Shah Rahman, Majo Chak, Karyal Kalan, Mattu Bhaiky, Artali Virkan, Pirthi Pur, Mangoki Virkan, Buddha Goraya, Leel Virkan, Aulakh Bhaike, Chandhar Kalan, Hardouday Virkan, and Matto Bhikay.

== Demographics ==
=== Population ===
Historical population
Year	Pop.	±% p.a.
1951	...	—
1961	...	—
1972	...	—
1981	...	—
1998	...	—
2017	535,746	—
2023	640,780	+3.03%

According to the 2023 census, Nowshera Virkan Tehsil has a population of approximately 640,780, with an average annual growth rate of 3.21% since 2017. The tehsil covers an area of 678 square kilometers, resulting in a population density of about 945.10 people per square kilometer. The literacy rate in Nowshera Virkan Tehsil is 71.36%. The tehsil includes the Municipal Council of Nowshera Virkan, which had a population of 59,639 in 2023.

== See also ==
- Tehsils of Pakistan
  - Tehsils of Punjab, Pakistan
  - Tehsils of Balochistan
  - Tehsils of Khyber Pakhtunkhwa
  - Tehsils of Sindh
  - Tehsils of Azad Kashmir
  - Tehsils of Gilgit-Baltistan
