= List of people from Gujranwala =

This is the list of people born, grew up or lived in Gujranwala city and Gujranwala District. The list is ordered by the professions of these people.

== Activists, lawyers and politicians ==
- Hamid Nasir Chattha ex- Federal Minister
- Iftikhar Cheema
- Rafiq Tarar ex-President of Pakistan
- Imtiaz Safdar Warraich
- Bashir Maan
- Bhupinder Singh Mann
- Usman Ibrahim
- Muhammad Iqbal Gujjar
- Akram Zaki
- Chaudry Tussadiq Masud Khan
- Jagdish Tytler
- Makhan Singh
- P. N. Haksar
- Khizr and Ghazala Khan
- Khurram Khan ex- Minister of Commerce, ex Minister of Defence, Minister of Power
- Ghulam Dastgir Khan ex- Federal Minister
- Muhammad Aslam Butt ex- Mayor
- Lala Jagat Narain Chopra
- Rishi Sunak, former Prime Minister of UK also has his ancestral roots from Gujranwala

== Actors ==
- Munawar Zarif, actor and comedian
- Sohail Ahmed, actor and comedian
- Saba Qamar, actress
- Arun Kumar Ahuja, Indian actor and producer
- Atif Aslam, Pakistani actor and Singer
- Babu Baral, Pakistani stage actor and comedian
- Amanullah (comedian), Pakistani Punjabi theatre performer, comedian and TV artist
- Murtaza Hassan, Pakistani comedian and actor
- Karan Dewan Chopra, Indian Cinema actor
- Govinda, has ancestral roots in Gujranwala, where his father was born

== Religious personalities ==
- Yogi Bhajan
- Faiz-ul Hassan Shah
- Vijayanandsuri
- H. W. L. Poonja
- Raza Saqib Mustafai

== Literature ==
- Ahmad Bashir
- Altaf Gauhar
- Amrita Pritam
- Giani Dhanwant Singh Sital
- Kripa Sagar
- Mahboob Alam
- Meeraji
- Nadeem Aslam
- Noon Meem Rashid
- Qadir Yar
- Shaista Nuzhat
- Zafar Ali Khan
- Dr. Younis Butt

== Military ==
- Qamar Javed Bajwa, Ex Chief of Army Staff.
- Nassar Ikram
- Ahsan Malik
- Hari Singh Nalwa
- Imtiaz Ahmed
- Jind Kaur
- Maharaja Ranjit Singh
- Mahan Singh Hazarawala
- Mitty Masud
- Prem Kaur
- Diwan Sawan Mal Chopra
- Mulraj Chopra

== Musicians ==
- Atif Aslam
- Imran Khan, singer
- Roshan, Indian music director
- Yashpaul
- Humaira Arshad

== Scholars, scientists and teachers ==
- Bashir al-Najafi
- Kewal Krishan Anand
- Parvez Butt
- Qaiser Mushtaq
- Rama Tirtha
- Vivienne Stacey
- Ram Nath Chopra
- Kasturi Lal Chopra

== Sportsperson ==
- Talib Ali - International footballer
- Khalid Butt - International footballer and manager
- Imran Nazir
- Saad Bin Zafar
- Bholu Brothers
- Harmik Singh
- Khalid Hamid
- Muhammad Inam
- Nida Dar
- Hasan Ali
- Talha Talib - 2018 Commonwealth Games Weightlifting Bronze Medal
- Nooh Dastgir Butt - 2018 Commonwealth Games Weightlifting Bronze Medal
- Muhammad Bilal - 2018 Commonwealth Games Wrestling Bronze Medal
