= Qasim Army Aviation Base =

- IATA: none; ICAO: OPQS

Summary
- Airport type: Military
- Operator: Pakistan Army
- Location: Dhamial, Rawalpindi
- Built: 1941
- In use: 1941-1945; 15 October 1962-Present
- Elevation AMSL: 1,581 ft / 482 m
- Coordinates: 33°33′37″N 73°2′0″E
- Interactive map of Qasim Army Aviation Base

Runways
Direction	Length		Surface
Direction	ft	m	Surface
14/32	6,693	2,040	Asphalt

Qasim Army Aviation Base or Dhamial Airbase (ICAO: OPQS) is a Pakistan Army airbase located in southern Rawalpindi, Pakistan. It is the headquarters of Pakistan Army Aviation. Dhamial was constructed in 1941 during Burma campaign and was initially used as the Para Training Centre later it was abandoned in 1945.

It became the first airbase of Pakistan Army in 1962 and before that the Army Aviation was using Chaklala airbase for its operations. It was raised on 15 October 1962 as Dhamial Army Air Base. On 3rd October 1964, it was redesignated as Army Aviation Air Base and renamed after Major Muhammad Qasim as Qasim Army Aviation Base on 12 December 1972 for his sacrifice in 1971 war. It was also the first airbase of Pakistan where Pakistan Army's first helicopters Bell H-13 Sioux were kept and flown. The 18 crated OH-13 helicopters arrived in Dhamial on 27 June 1964 and were assembled by an American team during September 1964.

It was built a few kilometers outside Rawalpindi city, but due to the expansion of the city, it is now surrounded by major colonies, including Askari IIIX. It is frequently used by small aircraft and helicopters. Dhamial Airbase is also used for overhauling helicopters, including Mil Mi 17, Bell 412 and Bell AH-1F Cobra.

In 1979, the following aircraft types operated from here: Aérospatiale Alouette III, Bell 47G, Cessna O-1 Bird Dog, Mil Mi-8 and Saab Supporter.
