= Vivienne Stacey =

English missionary (1928–2010)

Vivienne Stacey (1928–2010) was an English Christian missionary of the Bible and Medical Missionary Fellowship in India, and pioneered Christian missionary work to Muslim women living in Pakistan. She was principal and overseer of the United Bible Training Centre (UBTC) in Gujranwala from 1957 to 1982. She wrote over 15 books and 60 articles on subjects such as women in Pakistan and the history of Christianity in Pakistan, including several in the Urdu language.

== Family background and early life ==
Stacey's father was Frederick E. Stacey, youngest son of A. Stacey of Mildmay Park; her mother was Doris M. Evans, eldest daughter of the late Mr. D. J. Evans of Lyndhurst, Jenner Road, Barry, Wales. They were married on 30 July 1927. Vivienne was a bridesmaid at her mother's sister Blodwen's marriage at Trinity Presbyterian Church, Barry in 1935. In 1960 her parents were living in Chelston, Torquay.

With the outbreak of World War II, as a child of 11, Stacey was evacuated to mid-Wales with her mother and brother; at 15, she moved back to England. At 17, in 1945, she attended University College London, to read English. Matthew Arnold had called it "that godless institution on Gower Street".

== Conversion narrative ==
On her own account, in the English department at University College, London, Stacey befriended a woman by the name of Barbara who was a Christian. Barbara would meet with friends at a neighboring college that had a chapel at lunchtime to attend prayer meetings. After inquiring about her friends' disappearances, Stacey decided that she would attend the meetings, not to partake in the prayer but to observe what took place. Stacey later said that she was astonished at the sincerity of the group but did not understand it. Feeling uneasy about her current stance as a human being without a type of faith, she converted to Christianity, claiming she had a vision of an encounter with Jesus Christ; the date was February 1946. The next day she began to attend prayer meetings. This was the Christian Union of the Inter-Varsity Fellowship (IVF). In 1947 IVF became one of the ten founding members of the International Fellowship of Evangelical Students (IFES). Following her baptism, both Stacey's mother and father began attending church and became believers as well.

== Working abroad ==
Stacey began taking evening classes at London Bible College and started learning New Testament Greek. After acquiring a more formal biblical education, she joined the Bible and Medical Missionary Fellowship (BMMF, now Interserve), desiring to participate in a missionary outreach to Muslim women. Stacey was appointed to teach Pakistani Christian women and train them to preach among Muslims at the United Bible Training Centre (UBTC) in Gujranwala.

After a year of preparation and the study of the local language, Urdu, Stacey began her post at the UBTC in 1957. She became principal of the center, taking on the responsibilities of administration-building programs, as well as teaching for the next 25 years.

== Retirement ==
In 1993, Stacey retired from Interserve but continued her writing, itinerant teaching, and training leaders for Christian ministry among Muslims. She concentrated on writing.

In the week of 19–25 September 2010, Stacey died, leaving behind a legacy of progress in Christian and Muslim relations, specifically relating to women.

== Writings ==
Stacey was determined to write books in the Urdu language to aid Christian women in their interaction with Muslim women. But before this was possible, she made it a requirement of herself to write in her own language, to her own people, before she attempted a cross-cultural text. After having several booklets and two books published by the BMMF, Stacey started writing for the Masihi Isha'at Khan (MIK), or Christian Publishing House, in Lahore, Pakistan, at a time when the press did not have even two hundred titles in the local language, Urdu. She sought to write and have books published for the Christian church in Pakistan, with the contents varying from helping people relate to Muslims, attempting to cross cultural barriers, dealing with spiritual warfare, as well as various Biblical studies. Some of Stacey's articles subsequently appeared in about twenty languages including Korean, Kannada, Urdu, Dutch and English.
