= Jinnah Stadium, Gujranwala =

Multipurpose stadium in Gujranwala, Punjab, Pakistan

- جناح سٹیڈیم گوجرانوالہ (Punjabi) جناح سٹیڈیم، گوجرانوالہ (Urdu)
- JSG
- Interactive map of Jinnah Stadium, Gujranwala
- Former names: Municipal Stadium
- Coordinates: 32°9′29.40″N 74°11′16.20″E
- Owner: Pakistan Cricket Board
- Operator: Pakistan Cricket Board
- Capacity: 20,000
- Public transit: Jinnah Stadium, Gujranwala

Ground information
- Location: Gujranwala, Punjab, Pakistan,
- Country: Pakistan
- Establishment: 1981; 45 years ago
- Owner: Pakistan Cricket Board
- Tenants: Pakistan national cricket team Gujranwala Regional Cricket Association; Central Punjab cricket team
- End names
- Pavilion End; Scoreboard End

International information
- Only men's Test: 20 December 1991: Pakistan v Sri Lanka
- First men's ODI: 3 December 1982: Pakistan v India
- Last men's ODI: 16 February 2000: Pakistan v Sri Lanka

The Jinnah Stadium, formerly known as Municipal Stadium, is a multipurpose stadium in Gujranwala, Punjab, Pakistan. It is used mostly for cricket matches. Built in 1981, this stadium can accommodate 20,000 spectators and is known for having one of the fastest pitches in the world.

Jinnah Stadium is the only international stadium in Gujranwala. Since 2000, due to lack of international matches has led to the stadium being used for political rallies. The absence of a five-star hotel in Gujranwala is cited as the main reason for the lack of international matches at the venue.

== History ==
Jinnah Stadium was built in 1981 under the leadership of Alhaj Muhammad Aslam Butt, then Mayor of Gujranwala, the stadium marked the city's entry into Pakistan's major cricketing venues. It hosted its first and only Test match in 1991. Over the years, cricketers such as Wasim Akram, Waqar Younis, Arjuna Ranatunga, and Sanath Jayasuriya have played at Jinnah Stadium. Sachin Tendulkar made his ODI cricket debut in 1989 at this ground. The last ODI match played there was between Pakistan and Sri Lanka in 2000 and was the first ODI match Aleem Dar umpired. As of August 2024, Jinnah Stadium is under consideration for hosting some matches of Pakistan Super League 2025 edition, although no renovation work has been done on the stadium in the recent years.

=== Cricket World Cup ===
This stadium hosted an ODI match in the 1996 Cricket World Cup between Pakistan and UAE.

== One Day International centuries ==
The following table summarizes the One-Day International centuries scored at Jinnah Stadium, Gujranwala

No.	Score	Player	Team	Balls	Inns.	Opposing team	Date	Result
1	106*	Javed Miandad	Pakistan	106	1	India	3 December 1982	Won
2	102*	Arjuna Ranatunga	Sri Lanka	112	1	Pakistan	29 September 1995	Lost
3	102*	Saleem Elahi	Pakistan	133	2	Sri Lanka	29 September 1995	Won

== Five-wicket Hauls in One Day internationals ==
Only 1 five wicket haul has been taken at Jinnah Stadium, Gujranwala

No.	Bowler	Date	Team	Opposing Team	Inn	O	R	W	Econ	Result
1	Saqlain Mushtaq	4 December 1996	Pakistan	New Zealand	2	9.4	44	5	4.55	Won

== See also ==
- List of Test cricket grounds
- List of stadiums in Pakistan
- List of cricket grounds in Pakistan
- One-Test wonder
