= Sheranwala Bagh =

Public garden in Gujranwala, Pakistan

- شیران٘والہ باغ
- Interactive map of Sheranwala Bagh
- Type: Public garden
- Location: Gujranwala, Punjab, Pakistan
- Coordinates: 32°9′20″N 74°11′19″E
- Created: Late 18th century

Sheranwala Bagh (Punjabi: شیران٘والہ باغ; lit. 'garden of lions') is a public park located in Gujranwala, Punjab, Pakistan. Dating to the late-18th century, it contains the samadhi of Mahan Singh, the father of the Sikh ruler Ranjit Singh, as well as a baradari.

The garden was originally built by Mahan Singh and got its name from the statues of two lions which originally stood near its gate. Mahan Singh also built a two-storey baradari inside the garden. After his death, his son Ranjit Singh built his samadhi inside the garden in 1837. The Sheranwala Bagh Baradari was damaged by the riots that ensued in retaliation of the demolition of Baburi mosque in India in 1992, but was restored in 2012 by the Municipal authorities.

== Gallery ==
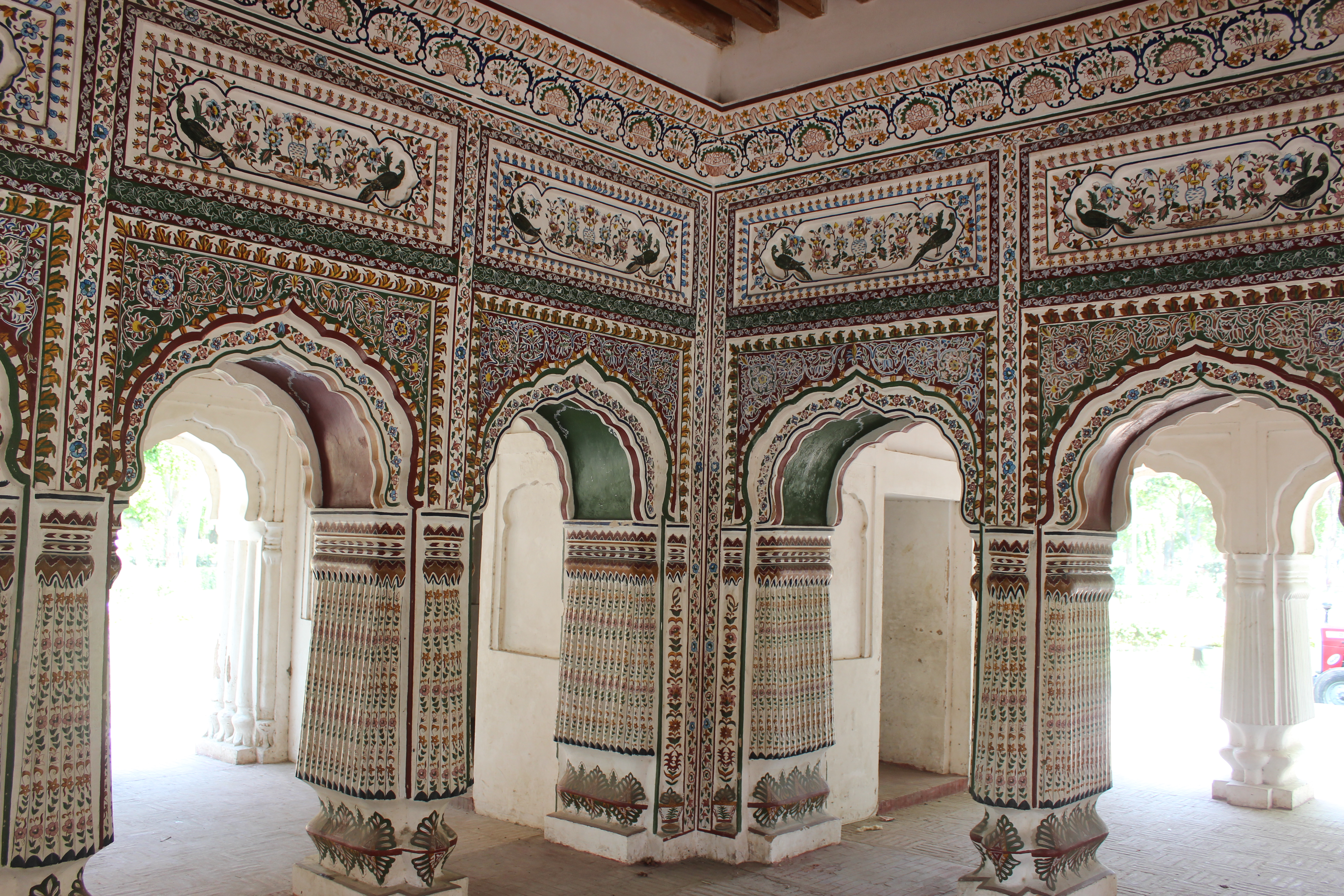
Inside view of Sheranwala baradari

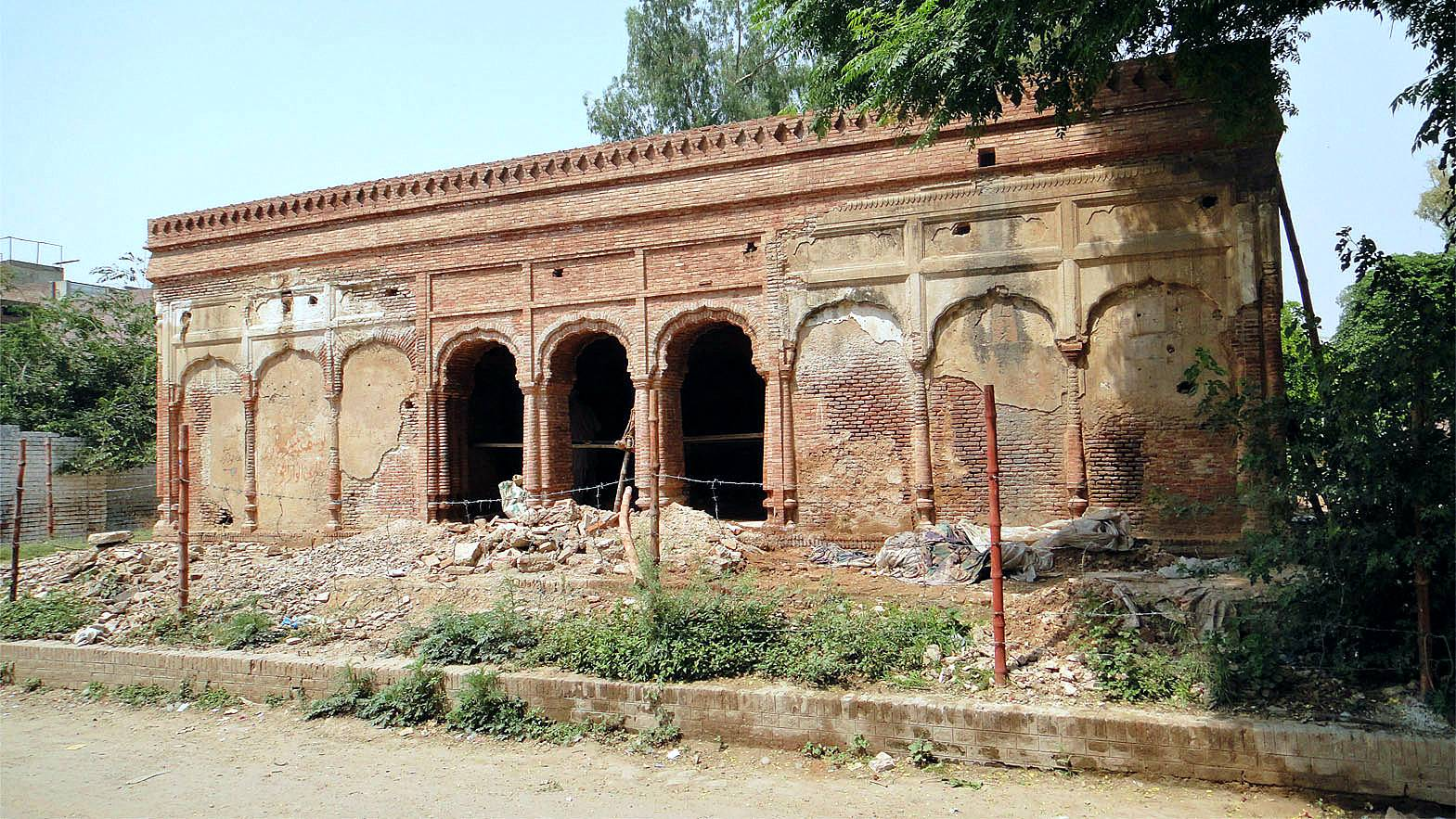
Sheranwala baradari

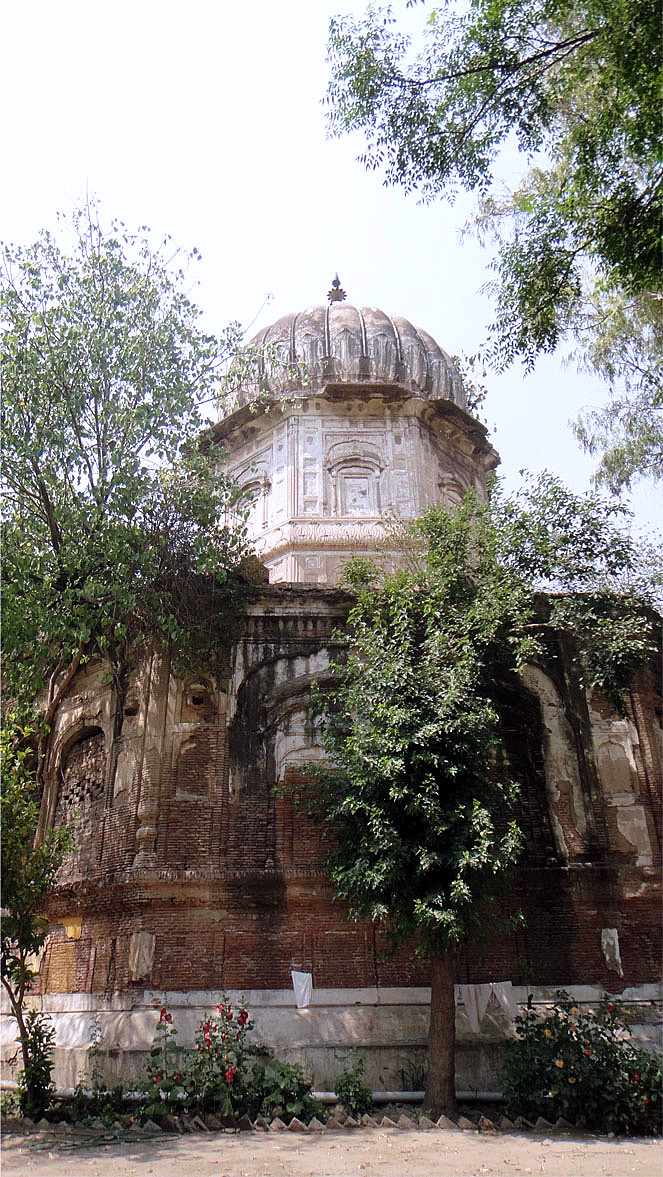
Samadhi of Mahan Singh in Sheranwala Bagh
