= Muhammad Aslam Butt =

Pakistani politician

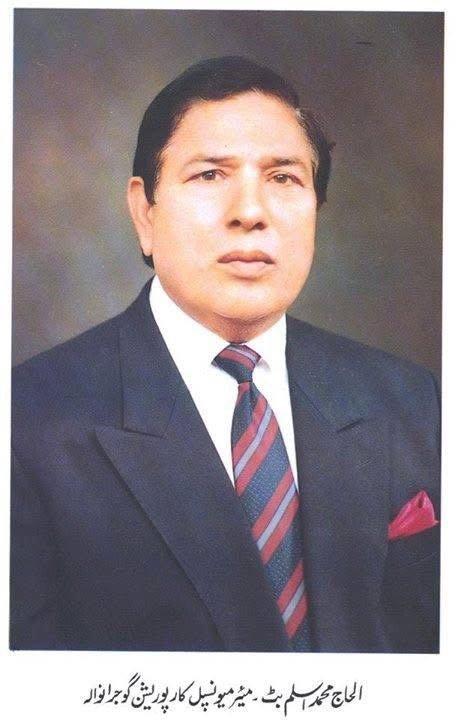
- Official portrait of Muhammad Aslam Butt

Mayor of Gujranwala
- In office 1980–1983
- In office 1983–1987
- In office 1988–1991

Personal details
- Occupation: Politician

Muhammad Aslam Butt (Urdu: محمد اسلم بٹ ) was a Pakistani politician who served as mayor of Gujranwala for three terms between 1980 and 1991.

== Political career ==
He served three terms as Mayor of Gujranwala Municipal Corporation: 1980–1983, 1983–1987 and 1988–1991.

=== First term (1980–1983) ===
During his first term, municipal works in the city included the construction of facilities that later became part of the sports and civic infrastructure, most notably the development of Jinnah Stadium, Gujranwala, which subsequently hosted international cricket—including the 1989 One Day International in which Sachin Tendulkar made his ODI debut.

=== Second term (1983–1987) ===
In 1983, 247 state kanals were allocated for the construction of a zoo project in Gujranwala; however, the work was not completed due to administrative issues. On 20 July 1983, he inaugurated the Janazgah at Bara Qabristan (Kalan), providing a permanent facility for funeral prayers in the city. A commemorative plaque marks this contribution. In 1985, he laid the foundation stone of Gulshan-e-Iqbal Park (also known as Iqbal Garden) in Gujranwala, a project initiated to honor the poet-philosopher Allama Iqbal. The park was established with support from the Punjab administration and became one of the city’s major recreational spaces. In December 1985, he inaugurated Jannat Bibi Park in Gujranwala, as recorded on a commemorative plaque dated 24 December 1985.

On 4 February 1987, he laid the foundation stone for the renovation of Liaqat Bagh, Gujranwala, during his tenure as Mayor. In 1987, he was involved in the establishment of Quaid-e-Azam Divisional Public School, a contribution acknowledged on the school's commemorative plaque.

In 1987, he oversaw the construction of the Municipal Corporation Building, Gujranwala, and laid its foundation stone on 29 October 1987 as Mayor of Gujranwala Municipal Corporation.

=== Third term (1988-1991) ===
In 1988, Jinnah Library, Gujranwala, was inaugurated by Chief Minister Mian Nawaz Sharif. The project had been initiated in 1987 under the supervision of Commissioner A.Z.K. Sherdil, with support from the Punjab Library Foundation. Al-Haj Muhammad Aslam Butt, as Mayor of Gujranwala, facilitated the project by providing land and municipal resources.

During his tenure as mayor, he allocated funds for the repair of the historic Gujranwala Clock Tower, but the restoration work could not be completed due to administrative negligence.

In 1991, he inaugurated Sagheer Shaheed Park in Gujranwala. In the same period, he oversaw the installation of fountains at Jannat Bibi Park (1990), and on 4 March 1991, he inaugurated the Liaqat Bagh fountains during the Mayor’s Conference.

== Personal life ==
His son, Engineer Muhammad Ashraf butt, was elected as a provincial member assembly of Punjab in a by-election.

== Death ==
Butt died in Gujranwala in December 2016 at the age of 85. He was buried in Bara Qabristan (Kalan) Gujranwala.

== Legacy ==
A road in Gujranwala was named Mayor Aslam Butt Road in recognition of his public service.

== Awards and recognition ==
In 2021, Butt was posthumously honored with the Heroes of Gujranwala – Pride of Pakistan award by the Gujranwala Chamber of Commerce and Industry. The award was presented by Dr. Arif Alvi, President of Pakistan.
