= Gujranwala Mass Transit System =

Metrobus system in Pakistan

Yellow Line

Overview
- Vehicle: Electric buses
- Status: Under construction

Route
- Locale: Gujranwala
- Start: Aimanabad
- End: Gakhar
- Length: 31.2 km (19.4 mi)

The Gujranwala Mass Transit System (گجرانوالا نظام حمل و نقل) also known as Gujranwala Metro Corridor and Yellow Line) is a planned bus mass transit system currently under construction in the city of Gujranwala, Punjab, Pakistan. The system will stretch 31.2 km (19.4 mi) and run from Aimanabad to Gakhar.

PML-N president Nawaz Sharif approved the project on 5 December 2025, and construction began the next day with a groundbreaking ceremony performed by Prime Minister Shehbaz Sharif and Punjab Chief Minister Maryam Nawaz. It is being built at a cost of Rs. 63 billion ($225 million) and is scheduled to be completed by June 2027.

It will include:

- A signal-free corridor with 4 underpasses
- 25 green stations, of which 24 are underground
- 14 MW electricity usage for electric buses
- Two depots on 25,292 square metres
- Pakistan's first trackless train (SRT) system
- Wheelchair-accessible features, charging ports, Wi-Fi and CCTV for women
- At least 36 electric buses
- 70 feeder buses collecting passengers from all parts of Gujranwala

== See also ==
- Green Line - Karachi Metrobus
- Orange Line (Lahore Metro)
