= Nanakpura =

Coordinates: 28°34′58.9″N 77°09′59.9″E

- Neighborhood of Delhi
- Location in Delhi, India
- Country: India
- State: Delhi

Languages
  - Official: Hindi
- Time zone: UTC+5:30 (IST)

Nanakpura is a residential and official conglomerate in the south of New Delhi. It is home to thousands of families that stay in the residential government quarters covered in Central Public Works Department residential pool of quarters. The famous Gurudwara of Nanakpura is one of the oldest site of historical importance in New Delhi and is a place of reverence for Sikh devotees all around the city. It is in the Bhilwara district which has a traditional semi-arid subtropical rain-fed agricultural ecosystem.

== Pincode ==
It bears the pin code 110021.
