= Imtiaz Safdar Warraich =

Pakistani politician (born 1952)

Imtiaz Safdar Waraich (Urdu: امتياز صفدر وڑایچ; born November 15, 1952) is a Pakistani politician affiliated with Pakistan Peoples Party. Previously he was a member of Pakistan Tehreek-e-Insaf.

== Political career ==
During his political career, Imtiaz Safdar Waraich has held office as General Secretary of District Bar 111 Association from 1982 to 1983, Member of Zila Council from 1983 to 1991, Member of the Punjab Provincial Assembly 1993–1996, Parliamentary Secretary of Law from 1994 to 1996, Advisor to the Chief Minister Punjab in 1996 and Director of the Punjab Provincial Cooperative Bank Ltd.
