= Dhamial =

- Location within Pakistan
- Coordinates: 33.33°N 73.1°E
- Country: Pakistan
- Province: Punjab
- Elevation: 492 m (1,614 ft)
- Time zone: UTC+5 (PST)

Dhamial is a village of Rawalpindi District in the Punjab province of Pakistan. It is located at 33.33°N 73.1°E with an altitude of 492 metres (1617 feet). The area gets its name from the Rajput cast ‘Dhamial Rajputs’ before the separation of Pakistan in 1947.

Some historical accounts suggest the Dhamyal tribe formed as early as the 12th century, after Muhammad of Ghor invaded and conquered India. There are traditions linking the tribe to Raja Dhami Khan and the town of Dhamiak in Jhelum, from where the various branches of the Dhamial spread across the Pothohar region.

Dhamial is a historically rich area in Rawalpindi, deeply connected to its Rajput heritage, and crucially important as the home of the Pakistan Army Aviation's headquarters.
