= Sikh state =

Political entity ruled by Sikhs

A Sikh state is a political entity that is ruled by Sikhs. There were various Sikh states, empires, and dynasties, beginning with the first Sikh state established by Banda Singh Bahadur to the Sikh-ruled princely states of British India. Sikhism turned toward militancy by the end of the 17th century and by the 18th century, the Sikhs had established themselves as a dominant player in regional affairs, becoming the political elite of the Punjab. This transformation has been described as being one of rebels turning into rulers. It is believed that Guru Gobind Singh bestowed the Sikhs with the mandate to rule the Punjab. During British-rule, the idea of Sikhs being a unique nation developed further and was aided by the colonial administrative policies. However, territoriality has not played a major part in the self-identity of the Sikhs.

== History ==
=== Theological underpinnings ===
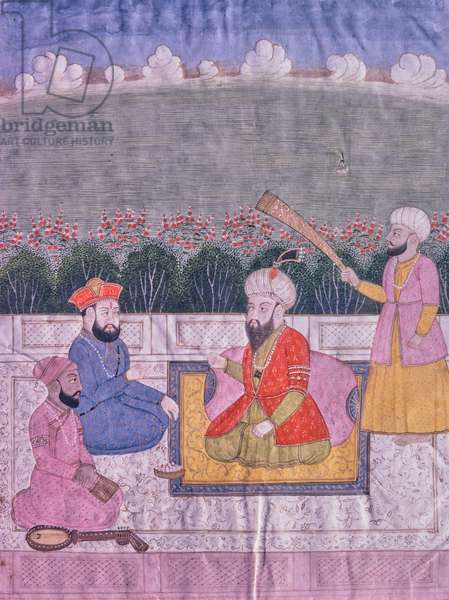
Painting depicting Guru Nanak meeting with Babur

Guru Nanak established Sikhism as a religious movement, whereby its followers were called to interact with the Divine directly live in the real-world through their own efforts. There was a prevailing Sikh belief in the mid-16th century that Guru Nanak was the master of both spirituality and temporality (din and dunia) but that he allowed Babur to have stewardship over political affairs. The Mughals had established their rule in India by 1526. However, the Mughals were seen as going against this bestowal when they executed Guru Arjan (in 1606) and Guru Tegh Bahadur (in 1675). Thus, Guru Gobind Singh was envisioned as coming about to destroy the Mughals and their rule. After the death of Guru Arjan, his successor Guru Hargobind introduced the Miri-Piri concept and went to war against the Mughals, which politicalized the Sikh movement. It was during the period of Guru Gobind Singh that reforms were introduced, such as the formal introduction of the Khalsa Panth and a steady ceasing of a personal, human guruship, preparing for a future without one. The last guru declared that after him the guruship would pass both onto the Khālsā Panth and Granth Sahib. The Khalsa was supposed to act in accordance with the scripture, which was the guiding wisdom of revelation, while the Panth was invested with authority (jāmā) that had formerly been conferred upon a personal leader (human gurus) but now was the responsibility of the collective community, with personal leadership being rejected. The goal set forth was sovereignty (patiśāhī).

==== Guru Gobind Singh ====
Guru Gobind Singh was brought up with an education in Indo-Islamic literature, which emulated imperial norms of that era. From 1677 onwards, the guru dispatched his Sikhs to the wider Indo-Islamic world, and invited scholars from Sanskritic and Islamic backgrounds to his court in Anandpur, with the formation of literary production and study, including in statecraft. Several texts studied and produced by the Sikh court in this period of the 1680s and 1690s include the Hitupdesha, Chanaka Shastra Bhakha, Mahabharata, and Shahnamah. Furthermore, Guru Gobind Singh wrote works that would later become part of the Dasam Granth, such as Krishna Avatar, Bachittar Natak Granth, and Pakhian Charitar, which expound on statecraft, sovereignty, and the concept of dharam yudh. The Prem Sumarag was compiled in circa 1700, which heavily dealt in kingship and statecraft. These works helped prepare the Sikhs for future rule and mostly saw themselves existing as an autonomous Sikh Raj that had been established by the tenth Sikh guru in Anandpur and Paonta in the late 17th century. In 1688, the Raja of Garhwal launched an attack on the Sikhs at Paonta, with the Sikhs emerging victorious, this battle was following by many others that the Sikhs fought with local Pahari rulers. In 1689, the Sikhs had fortified Anandpur, establishing demarcated borders. In 1704, a joint Mughal-Pahari Rajput force destroyed the Sikh raj of Anandpur and Paonta.

Guru Gobind Singh established the Khalsa, which involved a baptism and shared social-practices. According to Satnam Singh, the Khalsa was also established to work towards establishing Sikh autonomous rule over territories. The formalization of the Khalsa order, which is exemplified as being sovereign, in the late 18th century has been described by scholars such as establishing a fundamental aspect of national-construction that allowed for a "national imagination" that gave a shared identity to the Sikh community which allowed for sovereignty and territoriality. The Khalsa was a marker of the Sikhs being a separate Quom (nation), which Walker Connor (1993) explains allowed for the development of a national identity of some sorts "that joins people, in the sub- conscious conviction of its members, from all its non-members in a most vital way". Meanwhile, Anne Murphy (2012) and Fenech (2008) believe that any claims to sovereignty were "guru-centric" to establish an environment of a self-governing religious community. However, not all scholars agree that the establishment of the Khalsa had nationalistic undertones, according to Giorgio Shani (2008) the Khalsa "de-territorialises both sovereignty and the nation" and rather was about unlimited sovereignty. Murphy, examining the works of the court-poet Sainapati, stresses that the Sikhs of the past were not overly bothered with political sovereignty. According Nicky Gurinder Kaur Singh, Guru Gobind Singh's ideal of raj was about sharing power with others in a spirit of equality and democracy and not conquering for oneself, domination of a particular piece of territory, nor establishing a dynasty.

The bards Satta Doom and Balvand Rai state the following in the Guru Granth Sahib regarding Guru Nanak establishing a raj (governance or rule):

Nanak established the Dominion by raising
the fort of Truth on firm foundations …
With might and bravery of One’s wisdom-sword,
Perfection bestowed the gift of life …
The Light and the method were same,
the Sovereign only changed the body.
Impeccable Divine canopy waves,
the Throne of Guru-ship is occupied.

— Satta Doom and Balvand Rai, Guru Granth Sahib, page 966

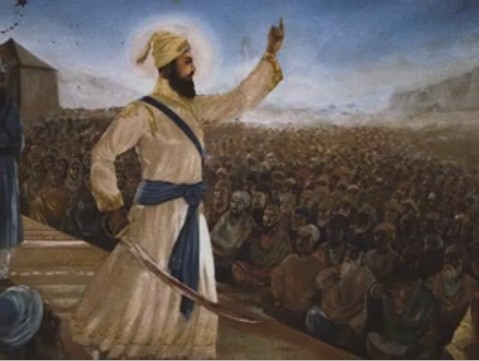
Guru Gobind Singh laid the foundation for later Sikh sovereignty

The Sikh concept of miri-piri emphasizes that spirituality and temporality are intrinsically linked to one another, legitimizing Sikh aims to establish their own sovereignty. Guru Gobind Singh taught the principles of Raj Karega Khalsa as forming the basis for Sikh-rule in the form of a commitment to political domination. In-response to a question posed by Bhai Nand Lal, the tenth guru responded as follows on the issue of sovereignty:

Nand Lal, listen to this truth:
I will establish the Raj (Sovereignty). (56)
The four categories will become one category,
I will recite Vahiguru (Awe-Wisdom) recitation. (57)
[They will] mount horses and fly hawks,
The Turks (empire) will flee seeing them. (58)
I will make one fight a hundred and twenty-five thousand.
I will free those Singhs (warriors) who ascend (die). (59)
The spears will wave and the elephants will be caparisoned,
The nine-instruments will resound from gate to gate. (60)
When a hundred and twenty-five thousand guns will discharge,
Then the Khalsa will be victorious from wherever the sun shines and sets. (61)
The Khalsa will rule and no one will be a dissenter,
All will unite after exhaustion, those who take refuge will survive. (62)

— Bhai Nand Lal of Goya, Nasihatnamah/Tankhahnamah, stanzas 56-62

Rattan Singh Bhangu's Panth Prakash describes Guru Gobind Singh as being the ruler of Anandpur in the 1690's, later blessing the Sikhs to rule over the Majha region.

=== Establishment of the first Sikh rule ===
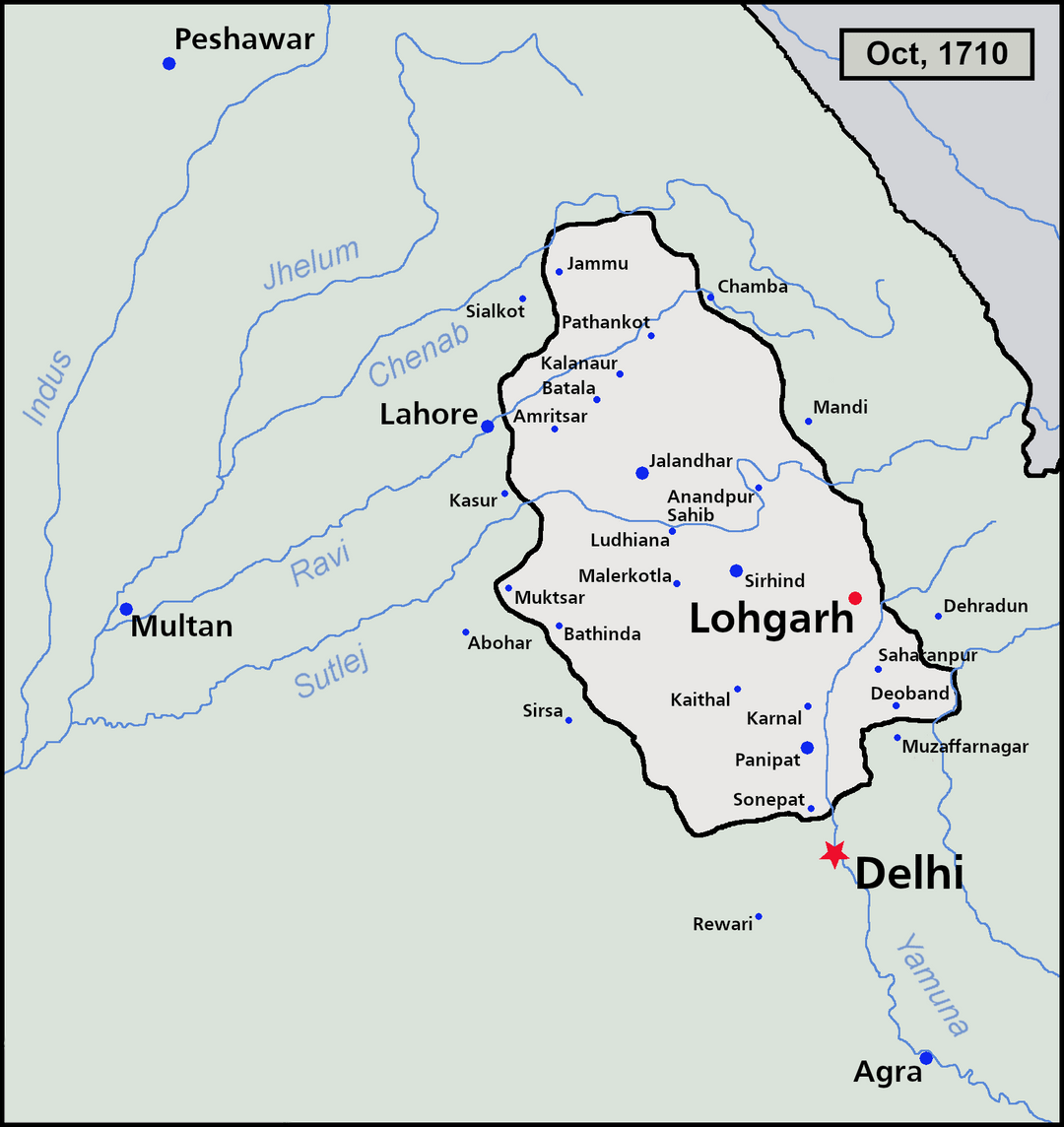
Territorial peak of Banda's rule (October 1710); ruling from Jammu in the north to Sonipat in the south

In 1708 shortly prior to his death, Guru Gobind Singh ordered a group of Khalsa Sikhs to attack Sirhind, kill Wazir Khan, and re-establish Khalsa-rule after the downfall of Anandpur and Paonta in 1704. Before the Guru dies, he formalizes that the new gurus of the Sikhs would be both the Guru Granth and the Guru Panth, with the panth referring to the initiated body of Khalsa Sikhs. The Sikhs shortly after the tenth guru's death came to believe they had a divine right and mission to rule over the Punjab. The first Sikh polity, albeit a short-lived one, was founded by Banda Singh Bahadur in May 1710, a disciple of Guru Gobind Singh, after his forces captured Sirhind and issued silver rupee coinage from the Mukhlisgarh Fort based at the Shivalik range. Khalsa-rule was established in the surrounding tracts of land. This was a republic that existed from 1710 to 1716. The issuing of coinage was a mark of sovereignty, marking the beginning of Banda's rule over Sirhind. Additionally, the Sirhind Sarkar was one of the most wealthiest areas of the Mughal Empire. Furthermore, Banda rejected using both the traditional Indic Bikrami calendar and the Islamicate calendar, creating his own calendar where the first year commenced on the date of his victory over Sirhind. Banda's state issued coins in the name of the Sikh gurus. Banda's rebellion lasted from 1708–1715, with the rebellion eventually failing with the capture of Banda and him and other prominent Sikhs (governors and warriors) under him being executed in Delhi in 1716. His execution marked the end of the short-lived Sikh state. Banda's short-lived state had existed as a parallel government in northwestern India, which motivated future Sikhs to work toward the same achievement.

=== Formation of the Sikh Confederacy ===
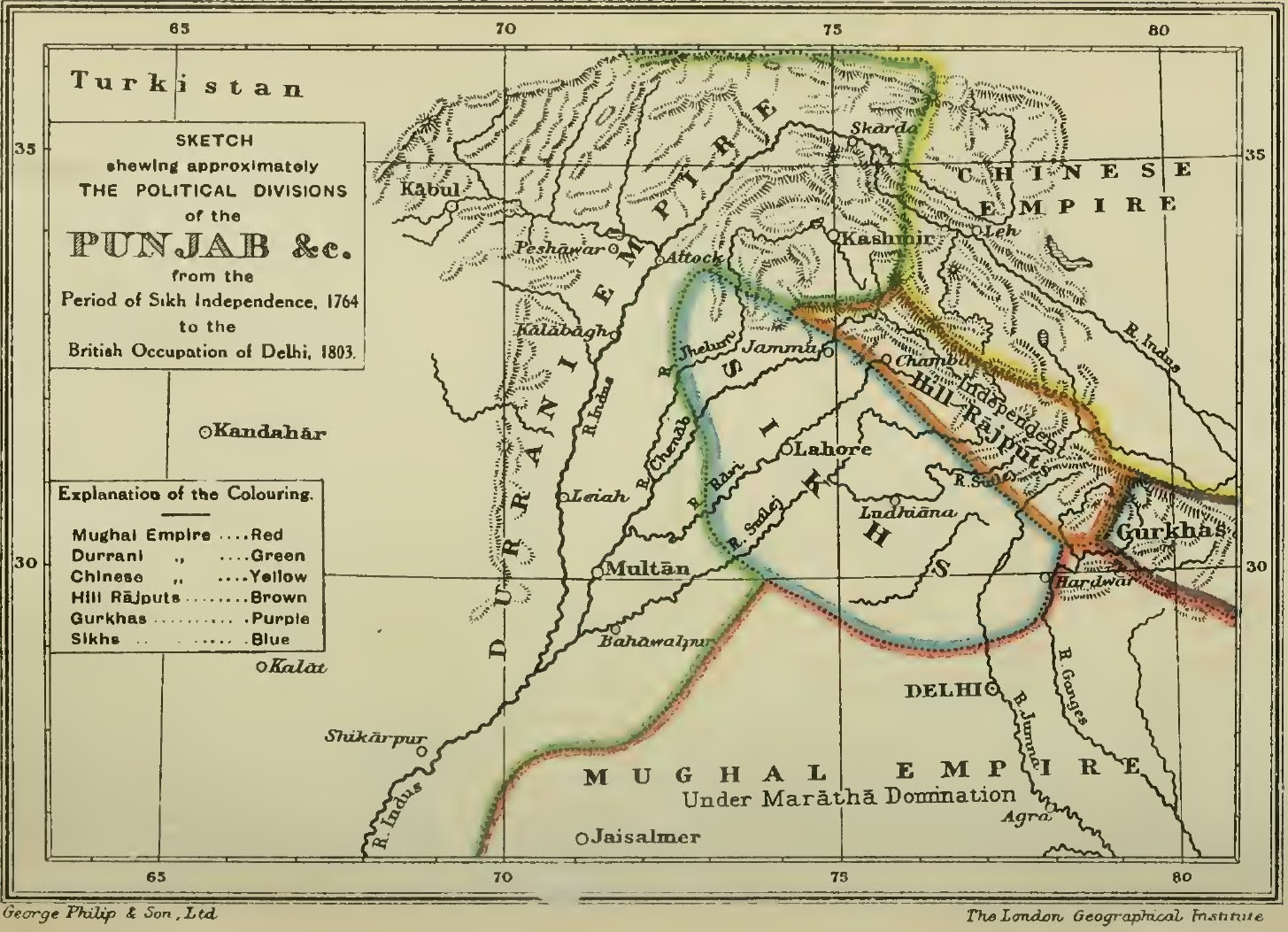
Approximate political map of Punjab from 1764 to 1803 by Joseph Davey Cunningham. The area under Sikh-rule is coloured blue.

The Mughal Empire in the early 18th century was one of decline due to a vartiety of factors, such as Persian and Afghan invasions. Bands of Sikh warriors, excited by the Khalsa ideals of sovereignty and Banda's temporary success, were active during this time, which has been labelled as a "heroic age" of the Sikhs. These Sikh bands were engaged in-warfare against their enemy, the Mughals, and eventually managed to conquer territory of their own. According to C. A. Bayly, the Sikhs were a social-movement akin to the Marathas, whom became empowered through their absorption of the "pioneer peasant castes, miscellaneous military adventurers, and groups on the fringe of settled agriculture". By the 18th century, groups of Sikhs had coalesced into bands known as jathas, which were based upon various personal, regional, and kinship-ties. The jathas themselves were eventually fused further to form a larger grouping: misls. The misls extended protection over tracts of lands in the central Punjab (doabs and bars) in-exchange for a payment in the form of sharing produce from the land being protected. The Sikhs began to construct mud-forts, known as garhis, as they began to conquer territory and establish their rule in the 18th century, such as by the Phulkians at Patiala, Nabha, and Jind. The later Sikh Empire also had a number of forts.

After the execution of Banda Singh Bahadur after Mughal military victories against the Sikhs, the Sikh rebellion went underground, with the Sikhs adhering to the concept of Raj Karega Khalsa ("the Khalsa shall rule") to maintain their aspirations for sovereignty. Between the period of 1726–1733, Zakaria Khan, the Mughal viceroy of Lahore province, enacted a genocidal policy against the Sikhs. After the oppressive anti-Sikh government policy failed to get rid of the Sikh threat, the Mughal government decided to try pacifying the Sikhs by granting them an official jagir (estate) grant. Upon Sikh request, a Nawab title was offered to the Sikhs, which was bestowed upon Kapur Singh in 1733 (since Darbara Singh had rejected it), alongside a khilat and bag of gold. In 1734, Nawab Kapur Singh divided the Sikh congregation into two groups: the Taruna Dal and the Buddha Dal. Each of these Dals ("armies") were further sub-divided into five groups (with Kapur Singh's own grouping being the additional). After a short period of peace between the Mughals and Sikhs, differences between them started to grow again due to the restless and provocative antics of the Taruna Dal, and the Nawab-ship that was bestowed upon the Sikhs earlier by the Mughal Empire was revoked and the jagir was confiscated in 1735. Thus, the former anti-Sikh genocidal policies of the Mughals was put in-place again and the Sikhs once again had to disperse to places of safe haven, such as the Lakhi Jungle.

With the invasion of India by Nadir Shah between January–May 1739 and the total destruction of the Mughal administration in the Punjab as a result, the Sikhs saw an opportunity for themselves and pillaged and sought revenge on their enemies. According to the contemporary writer Harcharan Das in his Chahár Gulzár Shujá'í, in 1740, one year after the attack of Nader Shah, a large force of Sikhs and Jats, including local Muslims, seized the Sirhind sarkar of the Jullunder Doab, establishing a short-lived polity with a person named Daranat Shah as its head. The rebellion was eventually crushed by a Mughal force in 1741 under Azimullah Khan and the Sikhs retreated to the Lakhi Jungle. According to Hari Ram Gupta, Daranat Shah was Baba Deep Singh.

On 1 July 1745, Zakarian Khan died and he was succeeded by less-effective Mughal administrators, such as Yahiya Khan. After this point, Kapur Singh divided the Sikh congregation into 25 bands (jathas), with each band consisting of about a hundred young Sikh men under the command of a respective leader. With this reform, a basic confederation structure for military activities of the Sikhs was forming shape.

From 1748 onwards, the Durrani Empire was invading the subcontinent, with them taking control of the Mughal provinces of Lahore, Multan, Delhi, and Kashmir. This period is marked by the Afghans, Sikhs, Mughals, and Marathas contesting for control over the wider Punjab region, especially Lahore province. After an initial invasion of India by Ahmad Shah Abdali, Kapur Singh realized that the Afghan invader would surely return for more loot, additionally due to the strict ruling-style of Moin-ul-Mulk, Kapur Singh resolved to reform the then 65 (the number of Sikh bands had since swelled from the 25 bands that had been established earlier) Sikh bands into 11 misls on the annual Vaisakhi gathering at Amritsar on 29 March 1748, establishing the Sikh Confederacy and its constituent misls, with the united army of all the Sikhs called the Dal Khalsa. The earlier Taruna Dal and Buddha Dal division system that was established earlier in 1734 was retained, with each of the 11 misls being assigned as part of a dal, with the seminal division being as follows:

- Buddha Dal:
  - Ahluwalia Misl
  - Dallewalia Misl
  - Faizulpuria Misl
  - Karorasinghia Misl
  - Nishanwalia Misl
  - Shaheedan Misl
- Taruna Dal:
  - Bhangi Misl
  - Kanhaiya Misl
  - Nakai Misl
  - Ramgarhia Misl
  - Sukarchakia Misl

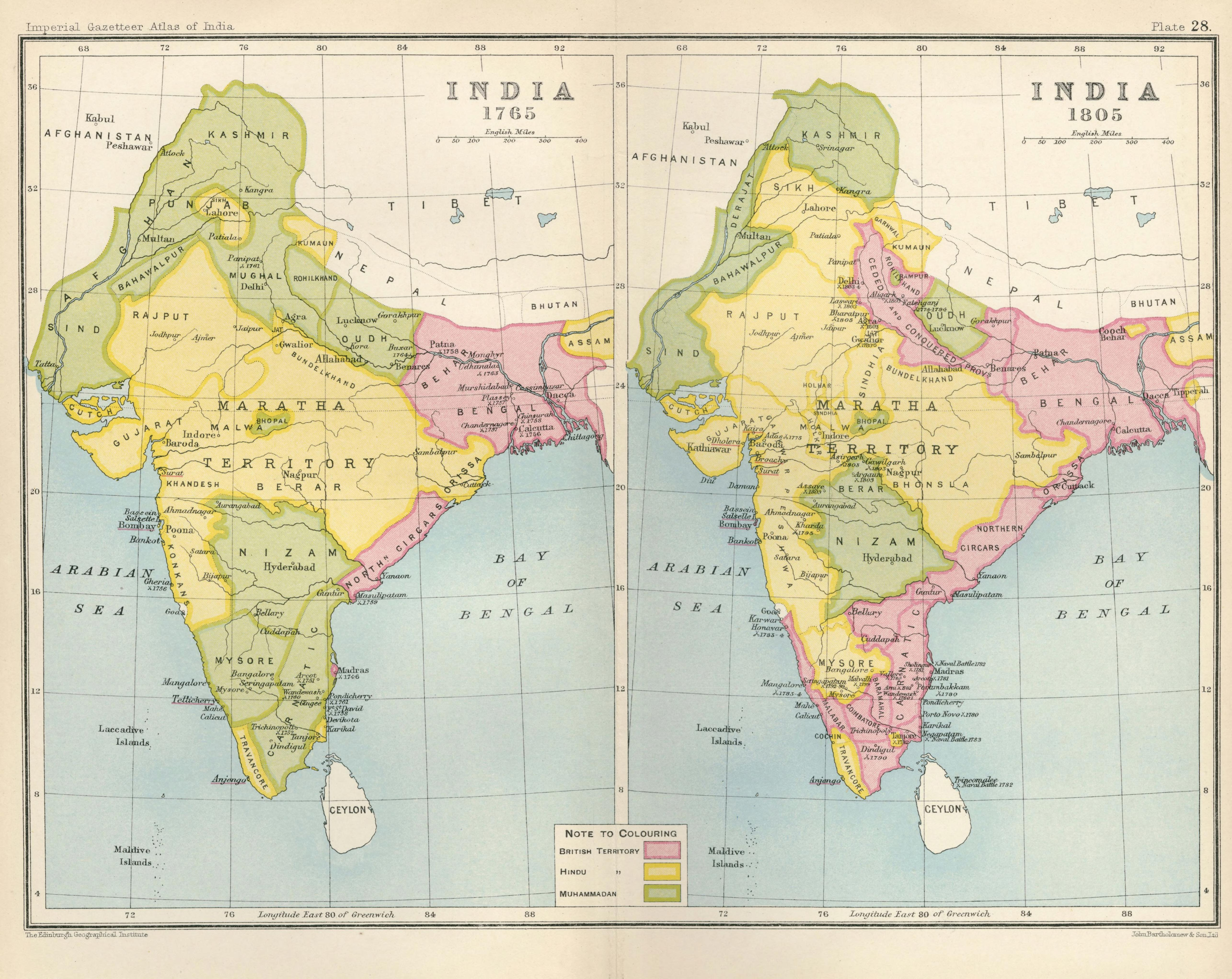
Political maps of India in the years 1765 and 1805, published in the 'Imperial Gazetteer of India' (Vol. XXVI, Atlas; 1931 revised edition; plate no. 28)

The misls have been described as military bands led by a central leader, known as a misldar. The chiefs of all the misls would convene bi-annually at the Darbar Sahib in Amritsar for an assembly known as the Sarbat Khalsa, with collective decisions being made by the body in-front of the Guru Granth Sahib being termed gurmattas. From 1750 onwards, the Sikh leaders Jassa Singh Ahluwalia, Jai Singh Kanhaiya, and Hakumat Singh began to occupy territories. The Sikhs were killed in large numbers by two genocides, the Chotta Ghalughara and the Vadda Ghalughara but their political ascendency continued, being aided by the Sikhs' attempt at state-formation and its accompanying institutions. By 1765, the Sikhs held Lahore and their influence spread allover the region.

=== Establishment of Sikh monarchies ===
In the second half of the 18th century, the various Sikh states could be roughly categorized into two groups: the misls of the Sikh Confederacy, concentrated in the former Mughal province of Lahore, and the Sikh principalities/chiefdoms that had been established in the former Mughal province of Delhi, with most being connected to the Phulkian dynasty. By the 1770s, there were more than 60 Sikh states that had been established between the Indus and Yamuna rivers.

Map of the country of the Sikhs (Sikh Confederacy) with names of prominent Sikh chiefs, by James Browne, British East India Company, 1788

In the 1760s, marked by the fall of Sirhind in 1763–64, many Sikh kingdoms began to take root after being founded by sardars (chiefs) of the precursory Sikh misls, such as Patiala, Jind, Nabha, Faridkot, Kalsia, Manimajra, Kapurthala, and Kaithal. The Battle of Sirhind (1764) was a landmark moment in Sikh history, as it marked the beginning of Sikh-domination in the cis-Sutlej tract. Sirhind had been attacked by the Sikhs four times in the 18th century. After the last attack known as the Battle of Sirhind in 13–14 January 1764, the cis-Sutlej tract became dominated by Sikhs after its Afghan governor, Zain Khan Sirhindi, was killed by a coalition of Sikh forces of both the Buddha Dal and Taruna Dal divisions of the Dal Khalsa military of the Sikh Confederacy. The victory of the Sikhs ended foreign Afghan-rule over the region. By 1765, Afghan administration in the region collapsed and was over-turned by the Sikhs. The Afghans were pushed-out and Khalsa-rule over the land was proclaimed, with the newly conquered territories being divided amongst the Sikh chiefs. Lepel Henry Griffin stated:

The storm burst at last. The Sikhs of the Majha country of Lahore, Amritsar, Ferozepur combined their forces at Sirhind, routed and killed the Afghan governor, Zain Khan and pouring across Sutlej occupied the whole country to the Jamna without further opposition. It is enough to say that with few exceptions, the leading families of today are the direct descendants of the conquerors of Zain Khan.

— Lepel Henry Griffin

Artillery, supplies, and treasures fell into the possession of the Sikh forces after the victory at Sirhind, which helped them further, especially Ala Singh of Patiala. The victory helped consolidate the political entity of Patiala. The settlement of Sirhind was mostly completely destroyed after the battle, which meant its former residents shifted to other locations, especially Patiala in Ala Singh's state. Ala Singh would strike coins in the aftermath of the victory, with the coins bearing similarities to coins that had earlier been struck by Ahmad Shah Abdali at the Sirhind mint.

Map created by the British East India Company of much of Punjab showing the various polities, borders, and settlements of the area, ca.1829–1835

The sarkar of Sirhind was cut-up and distributed amongst hundreds of both petty and prominent Sikh sardars. These new Sikh chiefdoms engaged in nation-building, such as by establishing new settlements, improving trade, patronizing artists and writers, and developing relations with other powers of the subcontinent. The Sikh kingdoms were mostly established in the region from the Sutlej river to the Delhi area, although some, such as Kapurthala and the Sikh Empire, laid in the trans-Sutlej region. Some of the Sikh states located south of the Sutlej were Patiala, Nabha, Jind, Faridkot, Ambala, Shahabad, Thanesar, Kaithal, Jagadhari, and Buria. A breakthrough was achieved when the Sikhs successfully took-over Delhi in the early 1780's, which allowed them to construct gurdwaras in the area. The Sukerchakia Misl formed the Sikh Empire after the capture of Lahore in 1799. Ranjit Singh was able to absorb most of the other misls to form his empire by 1799. In 1801, Ranjit Singh formally established the Kingdom of Lahore. However, the Sikh states located south of the Sutlej river mostly remained independent from Ranjit Singh's polity, with them initially recognizing Ranjit Singh's suzerainty but later choosing to ally with the British. The three main states in the cis-Sutlej region were Patiala, Nabha, and Jind, all of which were Phulkian states. In 1809, the remaining Sikh monarchies of the cis-Sutlej region came under British protection via treaty to protect themselves from being annexed by their powerful neighbour to the north and some of the survived until 1947 in the form of a princely-state. Patiala utilized its position between the Sikh Empire and British East India Company to expand its influence. The Sikh Empire expanded Sikh-rule to Kashmiri, Balochi, Pashtun, and Tibetan areas, creating a multicultural state.

List of Sikh sardars, their principal place of residence, number of cavalry and infantry troops, organised by doab, as observed by James Browne of the British East India Company, 1788
Place of residence	Names of sardars	Cavalry	Infantry	Total
Tract from the Yamuna to the Sutlej (Cis-Sutlej)
Karnaul	Raja Gajpat Singh	1,500	500	
Thanesar	Banga Singh and Bunga Singh	750	250	
Shahabad	Gurrum Sing Nermulla	750	250	
Ambala	Gurdit Singh	750	250	
Sirhind	Jassa Singh	1,500	500	
Khanna	Sonde Singh	225	75	
Payal	Hari Singh Dhaliwal	1,500	500	
Buria	Rai Singh and Banga Singh	750	250	
Seeundra	Diwan Singh Lang	750	250	
Damala	Dulcha Singh	750	250	
Babain	Gurdit Singh	750	250	
Kotana	Himmat Singh	150	50	
Manimajra	Bhagat Singh	375	125	
Pehowa	Desu Singh	1,125	375	
Khora	Dhanna Singh	1,500	500	
Fatehabad	Raja Sahib Singh	4,500	1,500	
Natta	Hamir Singh	600	200	
Total for the cis-Sutlej area		18,225	6,075	24,300
Bist Jalandhar Doab
Nurmahal	Baghel Singh	750	250	
Nakodar	Tara Singh Ghaiba	2,250	750	
Tute Serai	Jusa Singh	3,000	1,000	
Catta	Tara Singh Gaker	375	125	
Ghur Samger	Khushal Singh	150	50	
Jalandhar	Ma Singh	750	250	
Kapurthala	Jassa Singh	3,000	1,000	
Total for the Doaba area		10,275	3,425	13,700
Bari Doab
Lahore	Gujjar Singh, Suba Singh, and Lehna Singh	22,150	8,050	30,200
Rechna Doab
Shahdara	Maha Singh	15,000	5,000	20,000
Jech Doab and Sind Sagar Doab
Gujrat, Shah Dola, and Rohtas	Gujjar Singh (Gujrat) and Maha Singh (Rohtas)	7,500	2,500	10,000
Grand total		73,150	25,050	98,200

Ranjit Singh's polity led to the state patronage of the Sanatan Sikhs, whom he favoured. The onset of Sikh monarchical-rule also led to the weakening of the authority of the Akal Takht and the ending of collective-decision making in the form of the Sarbat Khalsa. Meanwhile, the Khalsa Sikhs maintained control over the Sikh Army, which allowed them to still wield influence. After Ranjit Singh died in 1839, his empire quickly fell to the British due to internal infighting and British scheming, resulting in the annexation of the Sikh Empire in 1849. Two Anglo-Sikh wars were fought, the first from 1845–46 and the second from 1848–49. The other Sikh states either allied with the Sikh Empire or the British East India Company, the states of Patiala, Jind, and Faridkot firmly supported the British, whilst the states of Kapurthala and Nabha were more ambivalent about supporting the British against the Sikh Empire. Nabha and Kapurthala were punished for their hesitation or allying with the Sikh Empire, but were not extinguished as states. The deposed boy-king of the Sikh Empire, Duleep Singh, was exiled to England. In the aftermath of the first Anglo-Sikh war, the region of Kashmir and Jammu was given to the Hindu Dogra ruler Gulab Singh, a former official in Ranjit Singh's court, in 1846 as the British felt they could not defend or occupy such a remote territory. The Sikh Empire never developed into a modern nation-state, being annexed before such a possible development could take-place, but rather can be described as being a "developing system of power".

Prominent Sikh and non-Sikh chiefships, polities, and independent estates in the Punjab as observed by G. R. Clerk, c. 1829–35 (Note: Petty chiefships that were "too intermixed and too insignificant" are not included in the table. The table also does not include polities in much of the western and northern areas of Punjab.)
No.	Chiefship/polity and modern spelling	Estimated annual revenue (Note: The revenue only covers the area depicted on the original map.)
1	British [British East India Company territory]	300,000
–	British Puttedars [British Pattidars]	166,000
2	Runjeet Singh [Ranjit Singh's territories / Sikh Empire]	1,700,000
3	Mahrajkean [Mehrajkian]	25,000
4	Nalagurh [Nalagarh]	50,000
5	Kotaha [Kotaha]	10,000
6	Furreedkote [Faridkot]	45,000
7	Nahan [Nahan / Sirmur]	1,000,000
8	Munnee Majrah [Mani Majra / Manimajra]	60,000
9	Belaspoor (Kuhlore) [Kahlur / Bilaspur]	60,000
10	Pateeala [Patiala]	2,200,000
–	Pateeala Misseldars [Patiala Misldars]	30,000
11	Kythul [Kaithal]	600,000
12	Kotela Mulair [Malerkotla]	100,000
13	Alloowallea [Ahluwalia / Kapurthala]	400,000
14	Jheend [Jind]	300,000
15	Nabha [Nabha]	400,000
16	Bhuddour [Bhadaur]	50,000
17	Mullode [Malaudh]	35,000
18	Koonjpoorah [Kunjpura]	50,000
19	Thuneisur [Thanesar]	80,000
20	Shahabad [Shahabad]	100,000
21	Ladwa [Ladwa]	247,000
22	Khunna [Khanna]	18,000
23	Singhpooriah [Singhpuria]	1,200,000
24	Zynpoor [Zainpur]	6,000
25	Bhuddul [Bhadla? / Bhadal?]	13,000
26	Chiloundee [Chilsundi?]	25,000
–	Hills [Himalayan / Pahari / Punjab Hills]	—
–	Sand Hills [Sand Hills]	—
27	Shahzadpore [Shahzadpur]	65,000
28	Jhoomba [Jhumba]	31,000
29	Tungore [Tangore]	35,000
30	Ramgurh [Ramgarh]	16,000
31	Sealba Majree [Sialba Majri]	52,000
32	Seekundra [Sikandra]	20,000
33	Bhore [Bhor? / Bhore?]	7,000
34	Shamgurh [Shamgarh]	5,500
35	Leelokhairee [Nilokheri]	4,000
36	Booreah [Buria]	50,000
37	Hallaher [Halaher? / Haler?]	12,000
38	Seekree [Sikri]	6,400
39	Kulseeahs [Kalsia]	165,000
40	Nahung / Kotela [Kotla Nihang / Kotla Nihang]	7,000
41	Khairee [Khaira? / Khaire?]	15,200
42	Sarun [Sarun]	5,000
43	Shamsingeans [Sham Singhwala]	62,000
44	Dayalgurh [Dayalgarh]	30,000
45	Ledah [?]	27,000
46	Moostafabad [Mustafabad]	10,000
47	Khizrabad [Khizrabad]	5,000
48	Raeepoor [Raepur]	8,000
49	Khurh [Khurh]	14,400
50	Roopur [Rupar / Ropar / Rupnagar]	65,000
51	Koomanoo [Khamanon?]	14,000
52	Kukrala [Kukrala]	14,000
53	Ludran [Ladhran]	25,000
54	Looteiree [?]	7,000
55	Kherree Choornee [Kheri Churni]	1,600
56	Bydwan [Baidwan]	30,000
57	Byrsaul [Byrsaul]	3,000
58	Urnoulee [Arnauli]	40,000
59	Koomreh Burreil [Kumran Burrer]	32,000
60	Jubbomajrah [Jabo Majra]	2,400
61	Bagreean [Bagrian]	12,000
62	Raeekote [Raikot]	5,500
Total estimated revenue		7,191,000

=== Colonial period ===
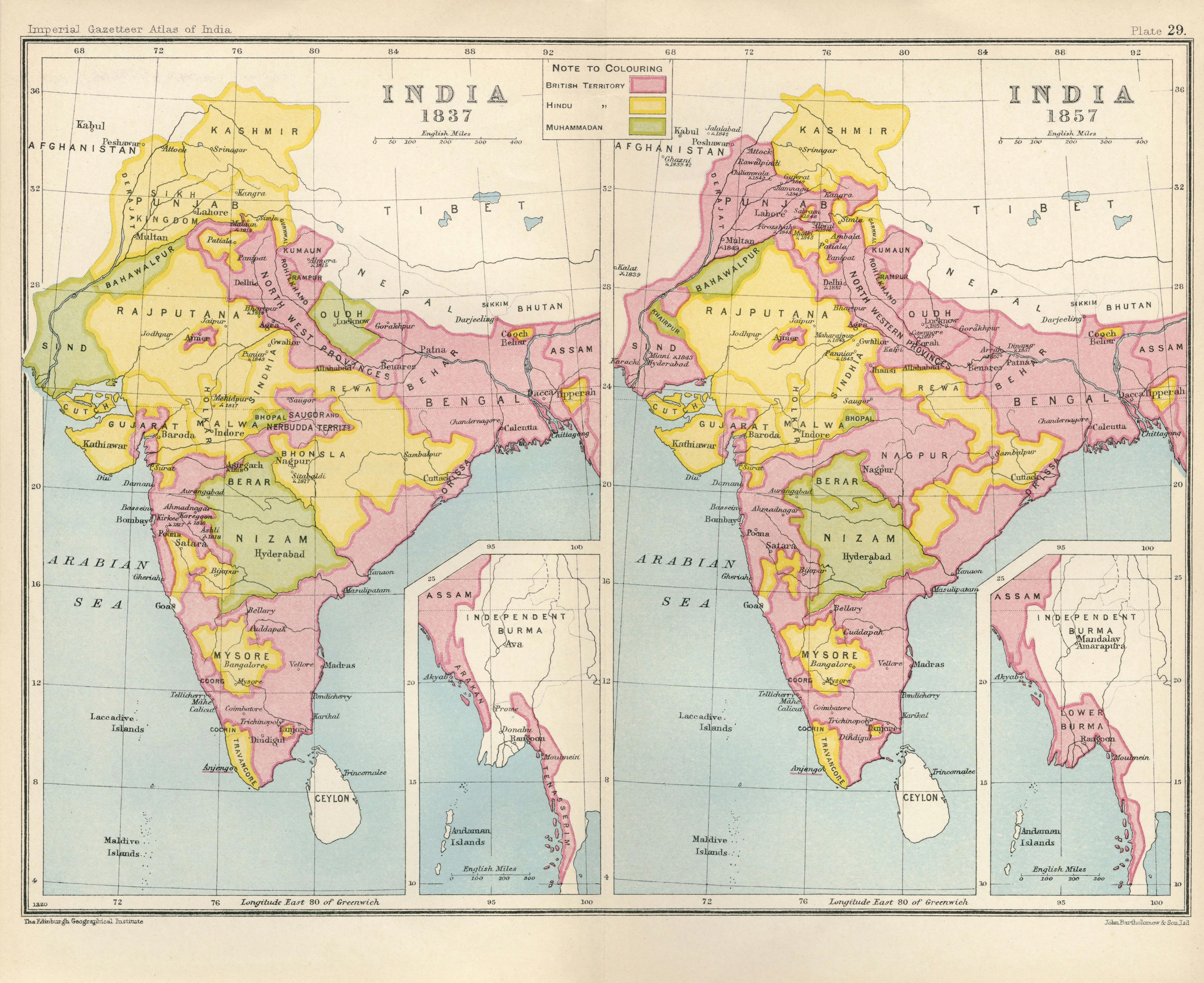
Political maps of India in the years 1837 and 1857, published in the 'Imperial Gazetteer of India' (Vol. XXVI, Atlas; 1931 revised edition; plate no. 29)

The fall of the Sikh Empire and subsequent colonization of the Punjab under the British challenged the long-standing, post-Anandpur belief of Sikh sovereignty (patiśāhī). The onset of colonial rule hastened the westernization of the Sikhs, leading to major changes in the religion and helping form its current conceptualization. It also allowed for the Sikhs to settle abroad, forming connections with formerly foreign and distant lands, allowing for Sikhism to become a global religion. During the colonial period, the British began to preferentially recruit Sikhs into its colonial military in the period after the Indian rebellion of 1857, as the Sikhs helped suppress the mutineers. Sikhs were labelled as being a martial-race by the British. After 1857, the British began to more firmly emphasize religious, racial, social, and caste differences amongst its Indian subjects, especially through its decennial censuses, the first of which was held in 1871. The British governed the Punjab through a careful balancing act between the colonial administrators, the landlords, and the traditional custodians of religious sites. Since annexation in 1849, the British evaluated the custodians of Sikh shrines and allowed them to claim proprietary rights over the religious sites. This would have major ramifications and lead to major social movements amongst the Sikhs. The British-rule made it possible for the Sikhs to develop further their sense of nationhood, where they began to view their religion as being a world religion and that the Sikhs themselves were a unique nation.

Earlier British works, such as John Malcolm's Sketch of the Sikhs: A Singular Nation (1812) and Joseph Davey Cunningham's History of the Sikhs (1849) characterized the Sikhs as being a nation. According to Cunningham, Guru Nanak had initiated the separation of his followers from Hindu "idolatry" and Muslim "superstition", whilst Guru Gobind Singh laid the foundation for a "distinct political existence and inspired them with the desire of being socially free and nationally independent", with this being realized and lived according to the author through the foundation of Ranjit Singh's polity. Cunningham described a pre-modern Sikh nationhood of being bound by the common Khalsa and a shared connection to the Sikh guru. Max Arthur Macauliffe in the late 19th century believed that the Sikhs were full of merits and at-risk of being absorbed by Hinduism, thus they needed colonial protection to safeguard their unique sense of identity.

The British Indian military promoted a standardized Khalsa identity to its Sikh recruits, as it highly favoured Khalsa Sikhs. All Sikh recruits had to be baptized into the Khalsa order through the khande-di-pahul initiation ceremony. The Sikh soldiers had to follow the Khalsa dress code and observe to Sikh customs. A granthi and gurdwara was attached to each Sikh regiment. Even British officers of Sikh soldiers sometimes wore turbans and wore the Sikh dressing colours, even paying respect to the Guru Granth Sahib. This British emphasis on Sikhism allowed for the Sikhs to become a hegemonic force. David Petrie states:

Sikhs in the Indian Army have been studiously ‘nationalised’ or encouraged to regard themselves as a totally distinct and separate nation. Their national pride has been fostered by every available means.

— David Petrie (1911)

The partition of Punjab in 1947 challenged the Sikh idea of their nationhood being connected to the Punjab, with much of it being now separated across a border.

=== Khalistan movement ===
Some segments of the Sikh community advocate for an independent state called Khalistan. There were calls for a separate Sikh nation apart from the Republic of India during periods of hardship in the 1980s and 1990s.

== Administration ==
Parganas, 'ilaqa, and ta'alluqa administrative divisions of Sikh polities tended to much smaller scale in-size compared to the Mughal administrative system and more numerous. An example of this is the Gujranwala district, which consisted of 26 ta'alluqas during Sikh-rule but three or four parganas during Mughal-rule. An explanation of this is when Sikhs occupied formerly Mughal-controlled territory, they divvied up the Mughal parganas amongst the Sikh sardars. A subdivision of a pargana or ta'alluqa was a tappa or topes. Sikh-rule over Kashmir led to the establishment of four new Kashmiri parganas. The Mughal pargana was comparable in-nature to the Sikh ta'alluqa. At the ta'alluqa-level, the Mughal office of the 'amil was comparable to the Sikh office of the kardar. The basis of revenue administration came from the positions of the muqaddam, chaudhari, and the qanungo.

The Sikh polities did not made radical changes to the pre-existing system but rather made slight changes, which do make them discernible from their predecessors. Whilst in main areas during the Mughal-period the zabt method was predominant, during Sikh-rule it was the ghallabakhshi and kankut that were dominant. However, the most dominant systems of assessment and collection during Sikh-rule were the batai and kankut, however the zabt method was employed in some areas. Outside of main areas, older methods continued unabated for the most part. The ijara practice became popularized during Sikh-rule but this method led to lower shares of produce being received by the state due to lower rates of assessment.

The jagirs bestowed by Sikh states were similar to the mansabdari jagirs that were granted by the Mughals. The dharmarth grants issued by Sikh states were similar to the madad-i-ma'ash grants of the Mughals. A key difference however was the proportion of revenue alienated by the way of jagir was much smaller during Sikh-rule in-comparison to Mughal-rule. However, the proportion of revenue alienated by the way of dharmarth was much larger during Sikh-rule compared to the predecessor Mughals. Another difference was that the proportion of hereditary jagirs was larger during Sikh-rule.

The three classes in-relation to land tenures was the same between Mughal and Sikh-rule:

1. Peasant proprietor – the most important position
2. Superior owner (zamindar or ta'alluqdar)
3. Tenant

During Sikh-rule, the position of the peasant proprietor improved in-relation to the ta'alluqdar whilst the position of the tenant improved in-relation to the other two classes above it. Sikh ruling classes received a relatively smaller share of surplus land revenue in-comparison to their Mughal counterparts, with the revenue during Sikh-rule being distributed to many sardars and rajas (with both being relatively equal in importance). Thus, the peasant proprietor and tenant classes were able to enjoy much of the produce they produced. During the reign of Ranjit Singh of Lahore State, there were no instances of agricultural crises.

== List of historical Sikh states and dynasties ==
The following list enumerates historical Sikh states, empires, and dynasties in chronological order, ordered by their establishment year:

State or Dynasty	Established	Disestablished	Founder(s)	Capital(s)	Citation
Early Sikh states
Sikh Raj	1680s	6 December 1704	Guru Gobind Singh	Anandpur and Paonta	
First Sikh State	1709	1715	Banda Singh	Lohgarh	
Nawabship of Amritsar	1733	1735	Kapur Singh	Amritsar	
Daranat Shah's State	1740	1741	Deep Singh	Unknown	
Sikh Confederacy	1748	1799	Kapur Singh	Amritsar	
Constituent Misls of the Sikh Confederacy
Ahluwalia Misl	1748	1846	Jassa Singh	Baggoki (1748 - 1754) Fatehabad (1754 - 1780) Kapurthala (1780 - 1825) Jagraon (1825-1826) Kapurthala (1826-1846)	
Bhangi Misl	1748	1802	Chhajja Singh	Sohal (1748 - 1750) Gilwali (1750 - 1756) Amritsar (1756 - 1802)	
Kanhaiya Misl	1748	1811	Jai Singh	Sohian (1748 - 1752) Batala (1752-1762) Mukerian (1762 - 1811)	
Ramgarhia Misl	1748	1816	Jassa Singh	Hargobindgarh(1748 - 1778) Tosham (1778 - 1783) Hargobindgarh (1783 - 1816)	
Singhpuria Misl	1748	1804	Kapur Singh	Jalandhar	
Panjgarhia Misl	1748	1809	Karora Singh	Shamchaurasi	
Nishanwalia Misl	1748	1809	Dasaundha Singh	Ambala	
Sukerchakia Misl	1748	1799	Charat Singh	Gujranwala	
Dallewalia Misl	1748	1807	Gulab Singh	Rahon	
Nakai Misl	1748	1803	Heera Singh	Baherwal Kalan	
Shaheedan Misl	1734	1809	Deep Singh	Shahzadpur	
Sikh monarchal states
Patiala State	1762	20 August 1948	Ala Singh	Patiala	
Jind State	1763	20 August 1948	Gajpat Singh	Jind	
Nabha State	1763	20 August 1948	Hamir Singh	Nabha	
Ladwa State	1763	1846	Gurdit Singh	Ladwa	
Faridkot State	1763	20 August 1948	Hamir Singh	Faridkot	
Kalsia State	1809	1948	Gurbaksh Singh	Chhachhrauli	
Manimajra State	1764	1875	Gharib Das	Manimajra	
Kaithal State	1767	1843	Desu Singh	Kaithal	
Kapurthala State	1774 (Note: Other sources give 1846 as the establishment year for Kapurthala State.)	20 August 1948	Nihal Singh	Kapurthala	
Sikh Empire	1799	1849	Ranjit Singh	Gujranwala (1799–1802) Lahore (1802–1849)	

== See also ==
- List of monarchs of Punjab
- Punjab States Agency
- Hill States of India
