= Battle of Thikriwala =

- Part of Mughal-Sikh wars
Date	c. 1731
Location	Near Thikriwala village
Result	Victory of Ala Singh and Dal Khalsa

Belligerents
Patiala State; Dal Khalsa	Muslim Rajput Alliance; Mughal Faujdari

Commanders and leaders
Ala Singh; Nawab Kapur Singh; Baba Darbara Singh; Baba Deep Singh; Sardul Singh; Shahzada Singh; Kehar Singh; Lakhna Dogar	Rai Kalha of Rai Kot; Asad Ali Khan †; Jamal Khan of Malerkotla; Daler Khan of Halwara; Qutab-ud-Din Khan of Malsian; Fateh Khan of Talwandi; Manj chiefs

Strength
15,000 men	40,000 men

Casualties and losses
3,000-5,000 killed	25,000-30,000 killed

The Battle of Thikriwala or also known as the Battle of Barnala was a battle involving Ala Singh and allied Sikh forces against a confederacy of neighbouring Muslim Rajput chiefs led in the field by Asad Ali Khan, faujdar of the Jalandhar Doab. The conflict arose after Ala Singh's occupation of Barnala, the destruction Nima, and the reaction of Rai Kalha of Rai Kot.

The fighting ended with the death of Asad Ali Khan and the flight of the confederate forces. The victory raised Ala Singh's status in the Cis-Satluj region and brought him into closer association with the Dal Khalsa. After the battle, Ala Singh took pahul from Nawab Kapur Singh at Thikriwala.

== Background ==
After Ala Singh occupied Barnala, Saundha Khan of Nima remained one of his powerful local opponents. Saundha Khan was a Muslim of Rajput origin who owned Nima and maintained about 300 horsemen. He also had the support of Rai Kalha of Rai Kot, who was related to him by marriage.

Chaudhri Vir Bhan of Sanghera joined Ala Singh at Barnala, strengthening his position. Around the same period, Isa Khan Manj was killed in battle by Abdus Samad Khan, viceroy of the Punjab. Ala Singh and his men then extended their activities into villages belonging to Rai Kalha of Rai Kot and Jagraon. Rai Kalha controlled the area south of the Satluj between Rupar and Firozpur.

Saundha Khan's death created an opening for Ala Singh. In 1731, Saundha Khan's adopted son Nigahi Khan, after being denied a share by Saundha Khan's two sons, entered Ala Singh's service. Nigahi Khan persuaded Sardul Singh, Ala Singh's son, to join him in an attack on Nima. Nima was captured and destroyed.

=== Rai Kalha's coalition ===
The fall of Nima angered Rai Kalha. Saundha Khan's sons approached Rai Kalha through his wife, who was their father's sister. Rai Kalha then appealed to neighbouring Muslim chiefs and gathered a confederacy against Ala Singh.

The confederacy included Jamal Khan of Malerkotla, Daler Khan of Halwara, Qutab-ud-Din Khan of Malsian, Fateh Khan of Talwandi, and other Manj chiefs. Asad Ali Khan, faujdar of the Jalandhar Doab and an ally of Rai Kalha, joined the expedition. The confederate force numbered 40,000 men under Asad Ali Khan.

The combined force advanced toward Barnala. Ala Singh received warning of the danger and sought Sikh assistance. Sikh groups from Majha were then present around the Bathinda desert under Kapur Singh. Ala Singh approached Kapur Singh and asked for help.

The appeal for Sikh support occurred during persecution under Zakaria Khan, governor of Lahore, when Sikh bands had withdrawn into jungles, caves and parts of the Cis-Satluj region. Ala Singh presented his position to the Sikhs in the area, and the Khalsa Dals joined him against the allied chiefs.

=== Sikh forces supporting Ala Singh ===
Ala Singh received support from Majha and Malwa Sikh forces. Kapur Singh, Diwan Darbara Singh and Deep Singh Shahid came from Majha with 15,000 men. Mehrajkian sardars Shahzada Singh and Kehar Singh, along with Lakhna Dogar from Malwa, joined with their own contingents.

== Battle ==
When Rai Kalha's allied force advanced on Barnala, Ala Singh entered Barnala fort and resisted the besiegers. The Khalsa Dals then arrived, and fighting continued for half a day. The encounter also took place near Thikriwala, where Ala Singh and Kapur Singh's forces met the opposing army. Asad Ali Khan was killed during the fighting. His troops fled, and the other allied forces followed. The retreat became a rout, and the Sikhs captured goods, horses, war material.

== Aftermath ==
The victory raised Ala Singh's position in the Cis-Satluj region. It marked a turning point in his career and helped establish him as an important chief. The victory also encouraged further conquests and laid the basis for later territorial acquisitions.

Ala Singh's relationship with the Dal Khalsa deepened after the battle. He took pahul from Nawab Kapur Singh at Thikriwala. He had previously been a Sikh of Guru Nanak and had not kept long hair before this initiation. He became the first member of the Phulkian family to become a Singh of Guru Gobind Singh.

Ala Singh offered to pay Kapur Singh an annual tribute because the Sikhs were living in poverty. He also laid a large well to provide drinking water to Majha Sikhs whenever they visited Thikriwala. A gurdwara was also erected at Thikriwala to commemorate Ala Singh's taking of pahul.

Some later writers claimed that Emperor Muhammad Shah issued a firman to Ala Singh after the victory. That claim is rejected by Historians after comparison with other historical facts.

== Bibliography ==
- Gupta, Hari Ram (1978). History of the Sikhs: The Sikh Commonwealth or Rise and Fall of Sikh Misls. Vol. 4 (3rd, illustrated ed.). Munshiram Manoharlal Publishers. ISBN 9788121501651.
- Dilagīra, Harajindara Siṅgha (2007). Sikkha tawārīkha de ghallughāre, 1716–1765. Sikkha Yūnīwarasiṭī Praisa. ISBN 9782930247236.
- Singh, Bhagata (1993). A History of the Sikh Misals. Patiala: Publication Bureau, Punjabi University.
- Singh, Ganda (1985). Singh, Ganda (ed.). The Panjab Past and Present. Vol. 19. Patiala: Department of Punjab Historical Studies, Punjabi University.
- Khan, Iftikhar Ali (2000). Ghai, R. K. (ed.). History of the Ruling Family of Sheikh Sadruddin, Sadar-i-Jahan of Malerkotla, 1449 A.D. to 1948 A.D. Pub. Bureau, Punjabi University. ISBN 9788173806698.
- Singh, Kirpal (1954). Life of Maharaja Ala Singh of Patiala and His Times: Based on Contemporary and Original Sources. Sikh History Research Department, Khalsa College.
