= Manauli Fort =

Derelict fortress located in Punjab, India

- Quila Manuali
- Manauli, Punjab, India
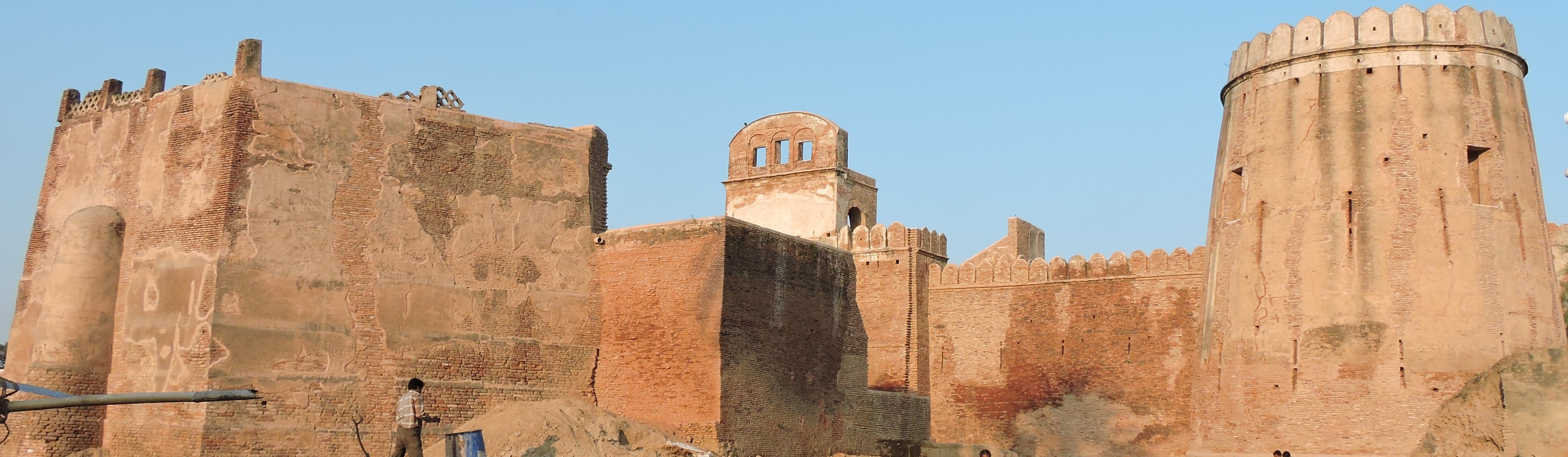
- Front view of Manauli Fort

Site information
- Type: Fort
- Controlled by: Government of Punjab (India)
- Open to the public: Yes
- Condition: Not Good

Location
- India
- Coordinates: 30°38′37″N 76°43′27″E

Site history
- Built by: Mughals (original); Nawab Kapur Singh

Manauli Fort, also known as Quila Manauli, is a fortress (qila) located in the middle of the Manauli hamlet in Mohali district, Punjab, India. It is 11 kilometres (7 mi) from Mohali city and Chandigarh and nearly 4 km away from International Chandigarh Airport Road Mohali.

Manauli is a small hamlet with a population of 3,919 and 693 households (2011 Census). As per land record area of the village is 738 hectares (1,820 acres) (s.no. 85). The fort is 6.1 metres (20 ft) above the village habitation level. The fortress was formerly owned by the descendants of Sardar Kapoor Singh of the Singhpuria Misl but is now controlled by the Government of Punjab. The fort is currently not easily accessible and there is a lack of awareness of its existence.

== History ==
As per local lore, the fort was constructed by the Mughals, which would mean it is around 300–400-years-old. One source states the fortress dates back to the 18th century. However, Verma (2023) dates the fort earlier to the 17th century and claims it was built by a Mughal ruler. The Mughal-era forts of the Chandigarh region date to the late 17th–18th centuries.

The local Sikhs of the area were being persecuted by the Mughal administrators of the region, thus a battle was fought here between the forces of Banda Singh Bahadur and the Mughals, with the Sikhs being victorious in the engagement. This conflict resulted in the first Sikh-rule and Sikh conquest of the fort, with the former battle being renamed Shaheed Bagh ("garden of martyrs"), in-honour of the Sikh warriors martyred there.

In the aftermath of the battle, the Sikh soldiers who participated in the conflict were awarded swathes of land and their associated villages in the conquered territories as jagir (estate). A Sikh warrior named Sardar Kapoor Singh was given control over the fortress and its adjacent land as a result. Kapoor Singh was later awarded the title of Nawab by the Mughals.

According to Verma (2023), the Singhpuria Misl of the Sikh Confederacy, led by Kapur Singh, conquered the fort from the Mughals between 1746–1756. However, Dhillon (2013) claims the fort was conquered by the Singhpuria Misl as late as 1793. As per Lepel H. Griffin's Chiefs and Families of Note in Punjab, after Kapur Singh the family who headed the jagir and owned the fortress was headed by Khushal Singh, then Budh Singh, then Gopal Singh, then Jai Singh, and then Avtar Singh.

Umrao Singh (b. 1896) was a minor when the mantle of leadership passed onto him as the legal heir, thus the estate was controlled by court management until 1921. After the independence of India in 1947, the jagirdari system officially came to an end but the next titular head of the estate, Sita Inder Singh receives the same jagir amount from the Ropar administration, equivalent to the amount prior to independence. Sita Inder Singh resided in Delhi in 2001 and sold much land in Manuali but retained control of the fort. Sita Inder Singh expressed interest in renovating the fortress and turning it a heritage site.

The fortress had remained in the control of the descendants of Sardar Kapoor Singh over at-least seven-generations, however they do not know how the fortress came to be possessed by their ancestors. Later-on, the ownership of the fort was bestowed to the Government of Punjab, India and tourism related to the fort has increased recently.

== Architecture ==
The architecture of the fort has been described as being a blend of Sikh and Mughal-styles. The main gateway, known locally as the Hathi Khana, of the fort is located on the western-side. The fort, consisting of three-stories, was constructed out of bricks (specifically Sirhindi bricks) and mortar and once was situated at an elevated level around 20 ft. higher from the rest of the surrounding locality, which allowed for greater defensive capabilities. The four corners of the fort are marked by round-towers that are 30–35 ft. in height with pointed barriers at the top of the towers. The walls of the fort contain embrasures. The fort contains a separate quarters for women. There are ruins of a maseet (mosque) on the opposite side of the main gateway in the western portion of the fortress. The fort is surrounded by grasslands and the surrounding settlement.

== Current status ==
The fort was formerly impenetrable but years of neglect have relegated it to a crumbling state. It is endangered by lack of official documentation, poor conservation efforts, encroachment, vandalism, and de-structuralization. The decline of the condition of the fort is attributed to weather and vegetation. Plants, such as banyan, palm and neem trees, have been growing without opposition in the fort's confines, causing damage due to their roots creating cracks in the foundation. Algal growth on the structure has led to further deterioration. The overgrowth has led to the fort being inaccessible in many parts due to unchecked tall grass. A tower of the fort is leaning due to the damage and there are broken tiles and fallen bricks. There is also a dried-up, broken fountain within the fort. The fortress is also being used as a waste dumping ground. The south-east corner of the fort is used as a mazaar by the locals, with candles being lit there on Thursdays. Locals often take bricks and other material from the fort's structure to repurpose them for their own needs, which endangers the future integrity of the fortress further.

The fort was not protected by the Archeological Department or any other government institution until 2001, when it was declared a "protected monument". In 2009, the fortress came under the control of the Directorate of Cultural Affairs Archaeology and Archives Museum Punjab. The government authorities managing the fortress have been criticised for not doing enough to preserve the structure. Government authorities claim to have spent 1 crore rupees on maintaining the fortress but defend their actions by claiming there is a lack of needed funds. Furthermore, they claim to have repaired the walkway located within the fort and to have assigned a dedicated caretaker of the fortress. A renovation of the fort was carried-out in 2016.

According to heritage material conservator Namita Jaspal, the archaeological department gives out renovation contracts to private contractors who use poor material to repair the site. There are fears expressed that the fortress is facing eventual collapse.

== Gallery ==
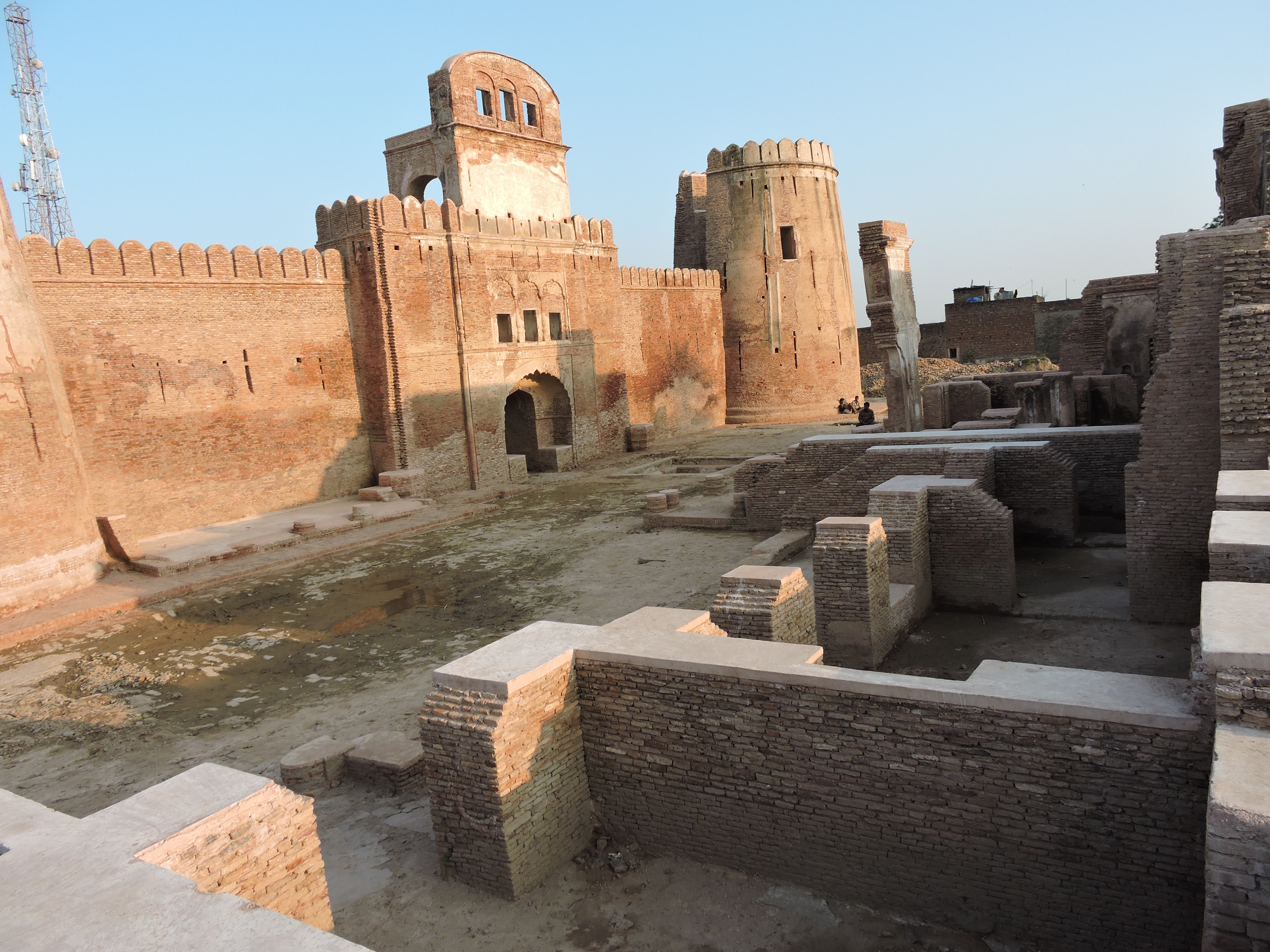
Manauli Fort, Mohali district, Punjab

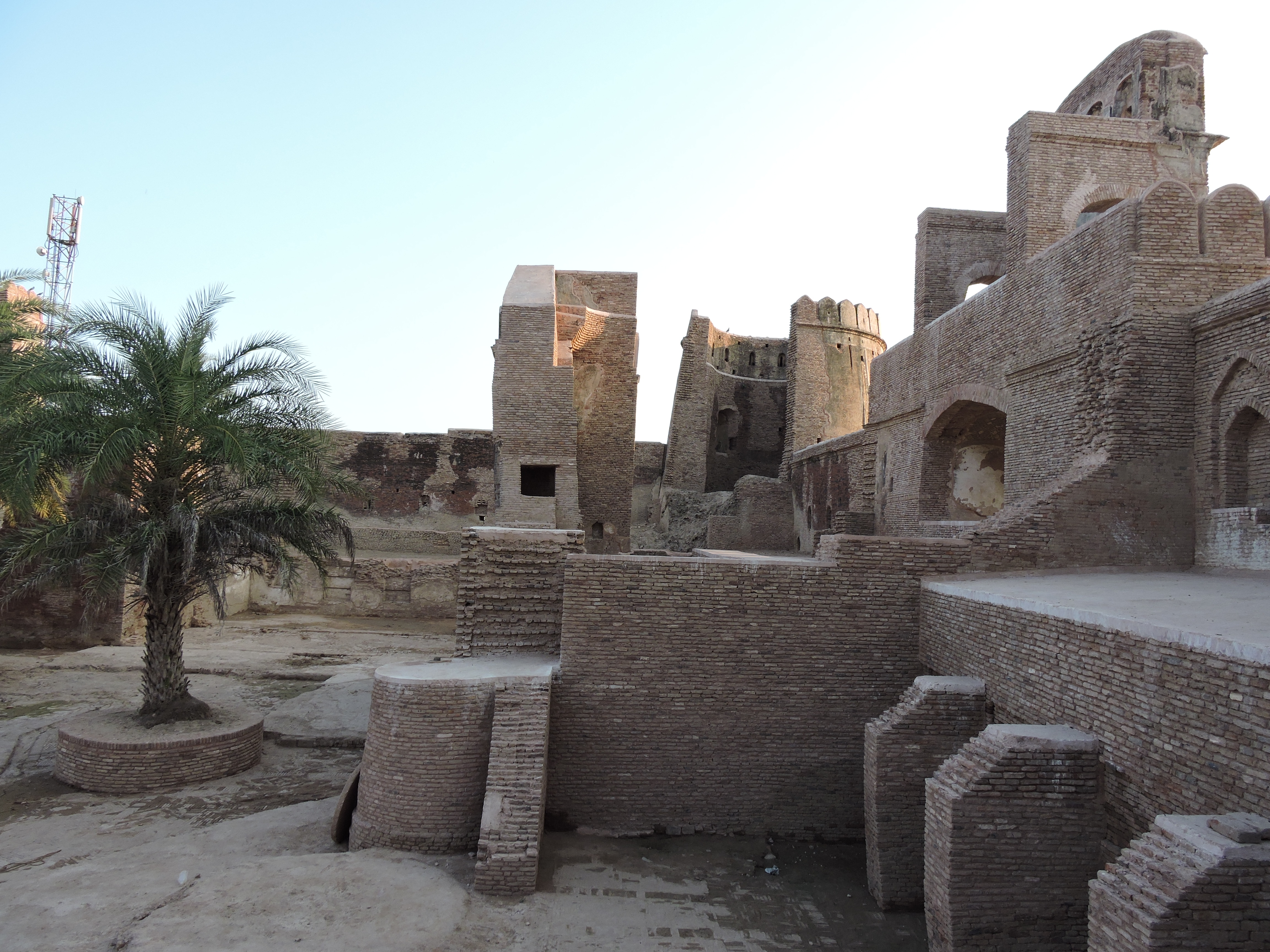
Inner view of Manauli Fort

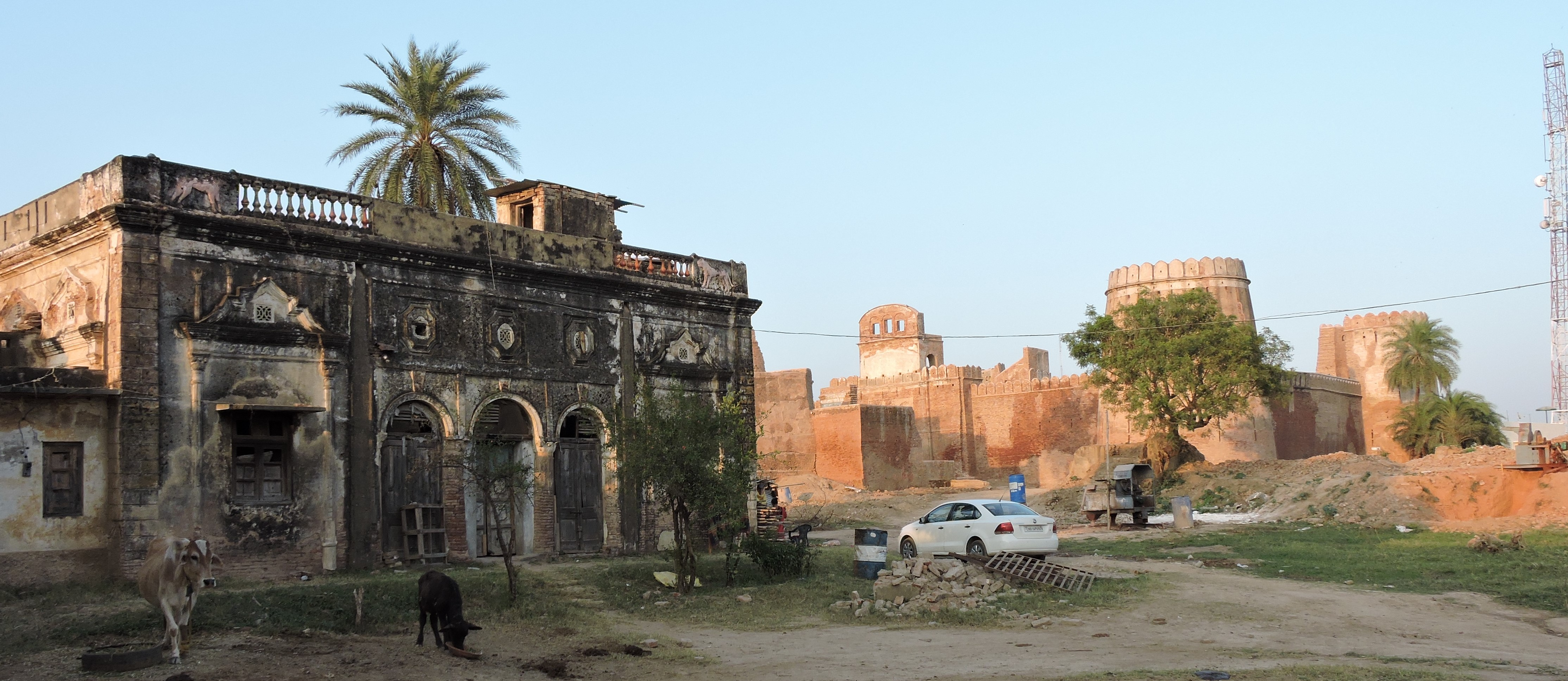
Complete view of the Manauli Fort complex

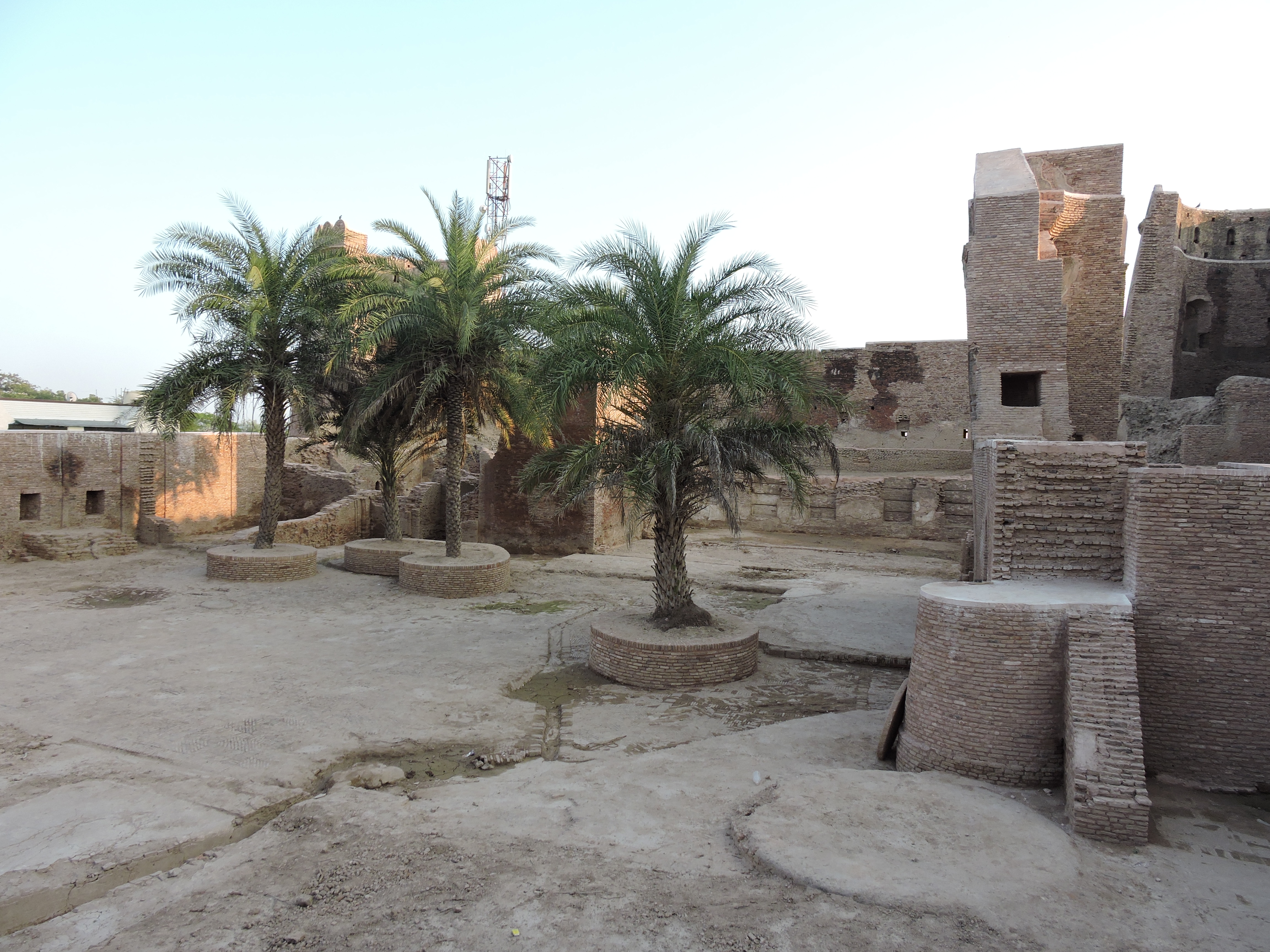
Growth of palm trees in Manauli Fort

== See also ==
- Burail Fort
- Manimajra Fort
