= Battle of Basarke =

1736 battle in Mughal-Sikh Wars

- Part of the Mughal-Sikh Wars
Date	23–24 October 1736
Location	Basarke Gillan and Hujra Shah Muqeem
Result	Sikh victory: Buddha Dal defeated at Basarke but reinforcements by Taruna Dal defeat the Mughals at Hujra Shah

Belligerents
Dal Khalsa	Mughal Empire

Commanders and leaders
Nawab Kapur Singh	Zakariya Khan; Lakhpat Rai; Haibat Khan; Mukhlas Khan †; Salabat Khan; Kutb-ud-Din Khan; Jamal Khan †; Tatar Khan †; Duni Chand †

Strength
Unknown	7,000 at Basarke; 10,000 at Hujra Shah

Casualties and losses
Unknown	Several thousand

The Battle of Basarke, also known as Battle of Basarke and Hujra Shah, was fought on 23 October 1736 between the Sikh forces led by Nawab Kapur Singh and the Mughal forces led by Lakhpat Rai.

== Background ==
Before the fall of 1735, Zakariya Khan, the Subahdar of Lahore sent a force and occupied a Jagir. Buddha Dal was driven away towards the Malwa region by Lakhpat Rai, the Diwan of Zakariya Khan. The Buddha Dal was welcomed by Ala Singh, the leader of the Phulkian Misl. The presence of the Dal proved a great opportunity for him, because with Buddha Dal's help, he was able to extend his territory and annex the whole of Sunam. After punishing the governor of Sirhind, Nawab Kapur Singh led the Sikhs back to the Majha to celebrate Diwali at Amritsar.

== Battle ==
When the Sikhs were at Basarke, they were attacked by an army numbering 7,000 under the command of Lakhpat Rai. They were defeated and forced to retreat. The next morning when the Buddha Dal reached near Khemkaran, it was joined by Taruna Dal. Reinforcements numbering around 10,000 more troops joined the Muaghl army at Basarke. A battle was fought at Hujra Shah Muqeem near Lahore in which the Sikhs came out on top and defeated the Mughals. In this battle, thousands of troops along with Mukhlas Khan, a son of Jaspat Rai, Duni Chand and two famous faujdars named Jamal Khan and Tatar Khan lost their lives.

== Aftermath ==
After this battle, the Lahore government committed actions against all Sikhs. They took possession of the Golden Temple at Amritsar and the Sikhs were prevented from coming to the temple. It was made unlawful to shelter the Sikhs or help them in any way as well.

== See also ==
- Nihang
- Martyrdom and Sikhism
