= Siege of Amritsar (1748) =

- Part of Mughal-Sikh Wars
Date	March 1748
Location	Amritsar
Result	Sikh victory

Belligerents
Dal Khalsa	Mughal Empire

Commanders and leaders
Nawab Kapur Singh; Jassa Singh Ahluwalia; Tara Singh Waeeyan; Chuhar Singh Bhakniya	Salabat Khan †; Nijabat Khan †; Qutab-ud-Din †

Strength
Unknown	Unknown

Casualties and losses
Unknown	Unknown

The siege of Amritsar was a siege that took place in March 1748. The Battle was fought between the Sikhs led by Nawab Kapur Singh against the Mughal Forces led by Salabat Khan. The Sikhs successfully defeated and killed Salabat Khan and conquered the city of Amritsar from the Mughals.

== Background ==
After the execution of Bhai Mani Singh, control over the city of Amritsar was taken by the Mughal Empire. The first person in charge of the city was Qazi Abdul Rehman Khan who was killed while fighting the Sikhs in a battle. The second was Massa Ranghar who was assassinated by Sukha Singh and Mehtab Singh Bhangu. In 1747, a Muslim Rajput named Salabat Khan was appointed the 3rd person to be in charge of the city of Amritsar. The Mughal Empire was preoccupied with the invasion of Ahmad Shah Abdali, thus the Sikhs took the opportunity to retake Amritsar.

== Battle ==
Nawab Kapur Singh promoted Jassa Singh Ahluwalia as the main commander to lead the campaign. They along with Tara Singh Waeeyan, Chuhar Singh Bhakniya and their armies besieged Amritsar. Jassa Singh Ahluwalia marched towards Salabat Khan and beheaded him with his Khanda. His nephew Nijabat Khan attacked Jassa Singh but Nawab Kapur Singh killed him. Another commander named Qutab-ud-Din was slain by the Sikhs. After the death of the Mughal commanders, the Mughal army was routed.

== Aftermath ==
The Sikhs looted a large amount of ammunition and weapons left by the Mughals in the Shri Harmandir Sahib. The temple was repaired, and Sikhs were able to visit and pray after several years of Mughal occupation. The Sikhs had a Sarbat Khalsa during Vaisakhi on 29 March 1748 in which Jassa Singh Ahluwalia was chosen to be the supreme leader of the Sikhs and the start of the Sikh Misls.

== See also ==
- Nihang
- Martyrdom and Sikhism
