= Khushal Singh Singhpuria =

Nawab of Singhpuria Misl

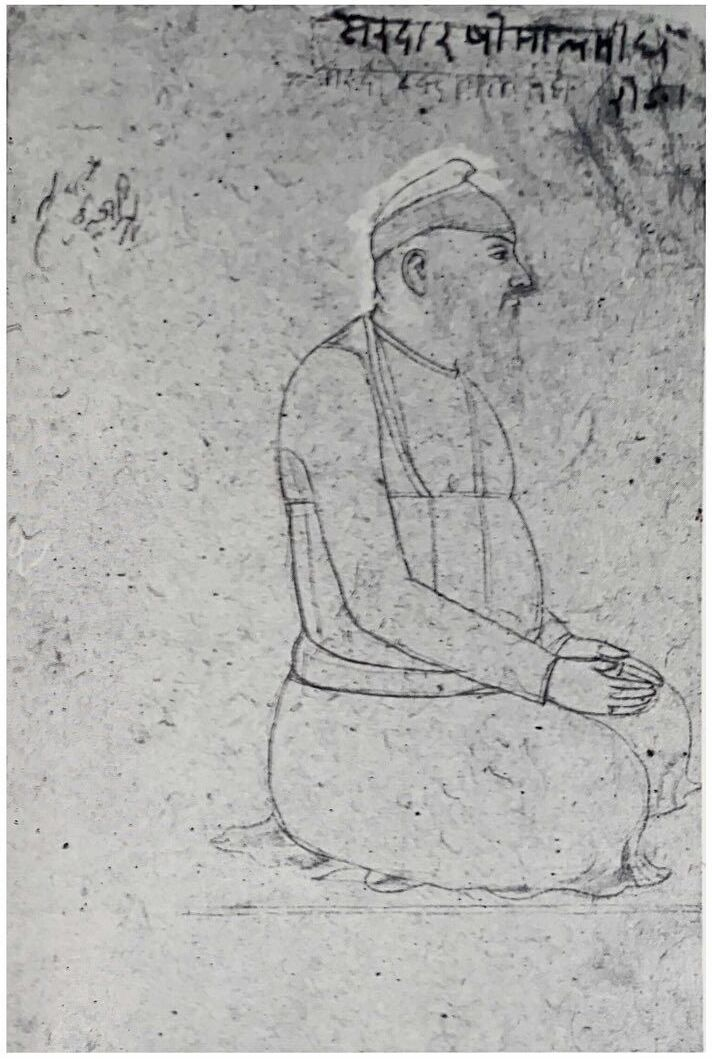
Sketch of Khushal Singh of the Singhpuria Misl, Sikh school, Punjab Plains, ca.1845–50

Khushal Singh was the second chief of Singhpuria Misl from 1753 to 1795, extending its territory on both sides of the Sutlej River. His 'acquired' lands included Jalandhar, Nurpur, Bahrampur, Patti and Bharatgarh. Jalandhar doab and adjoining areas yielded an annual income of three lakh rupees.

== Early life ==
He succeeded Nawab Kapur Singh as the chief of the Singhpuria Misl.

== Military campaigns ==
In 1759, After the death of Adina Beg, He along with Jassa Singh Ahluwalia attacked his Diwan Bhishmbar and captured Jalandhar, Mahangarwal, Lambra. He made Jalandhar his headquarters and started living there. Khushal Singh added more precincts to the territory which he had inherited from his predecessor. He captured Haibatpur and Patti from the Pathan chiefs of the Kasur

In 1764, at the Sikh conquest of Sirhind, He acquired Bharatgarh, Bhareli, Chune Machhli, Ghanauli, Jhunga, Kandhaulah, and Manauli, worth one lakh and a half after that he made an joint Sikh Invasion of Ganga-Yamuna with Jassa Singh Ahluwalia.

In December 1766, Khushal Singh, accompanied by Tara Singh Abbu, with 6000 horsemen, was stationed at Taragarh about 30 km from the Durrani camp, They constantly harassed Durrani forces. On 15 January 1767, Ahmad Shah Durrani wrote letters to the Sardars, including Khushal Singh, to the effect that if they were desirous of entering his service they should come and join him, but if they had any hostile intentions they should meet him in the field and fight him. Khushal Singh and others warily accepted Durrani's proposal of joining him and told to meet him in the field of battle.

He seized Chhat and Banur accompanied by Amar Singh, the ruler of Patiala from the Nawab of Raikot, They were divided between themselves, Amar Singh received Banur and Khushal Singh received Chhat, Hari Singh of Rupar seized ten villages of Khushal Singh, three Parganahs of Nalagarh and two Parganahs of Bilaspur State, These Rajas invited Khushal Singh to join them in recovering their territories, A battle was fought at Golewala and all the three recovered their lost territories, Khushal Singh constructed katra at Amritsar, which was named after his Misal.

== Death and succession ==
Khushal Singh died in 1795. He was succeeded by his son S. Budh Singh.
