= Faizullapur =

Coordinates: 30.635°N 76.153°E

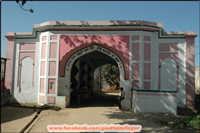

Faizullapur is a village in the amloh tehsil in the fatehgarh district of Punjab, India. 147203

== Population ==
Faizullapur has a total population of about 1802 (roughly 605 males and 598+ females). About 400 people come under Scheduled Cast (SC). There is a total of about 350 families in Faizullapur, according to government figures.

== Places of worship ==
Prakash Divas of Guru Nanak Dev are the major events, which people from all over join in.

- Gurudwara sahib: This Gurudwara is a holy place for Sikhs, but everyone is welcome. Every month on the day of SANGRAD there is a programme. Every year on the birthday of Guru Nanak Dev ji, Parbhat Feri is held.
- Mandir: There is one mandir (temple), as well, where people hold programmes from time to time.
- Masjid: There is one masjid (mosque) as well. Every year there is a programme held at the mosque; Qawwals attend and sing devotional music.

== See also ==
- Singhpuria Misl
