= Manauli =

Hamlet in Punjab, India

Manauli is a small hamlet located in Mohali district, Punjab, India with a population of 3,919 and 693 households (2011 Census). As per land record area of the village is 738 hectares (1,820 acres) (s.no. 85). The historic Manauli Fort is located in the settlement.
