= Singhpuria Misl =

Sovereign state of the Sikh Confederacy

Singhpuria Misl ਸਿੰਘਪੁਰੀਆ ਮਿਸਲ Singhpurī'ā Misal
- 1733–1816
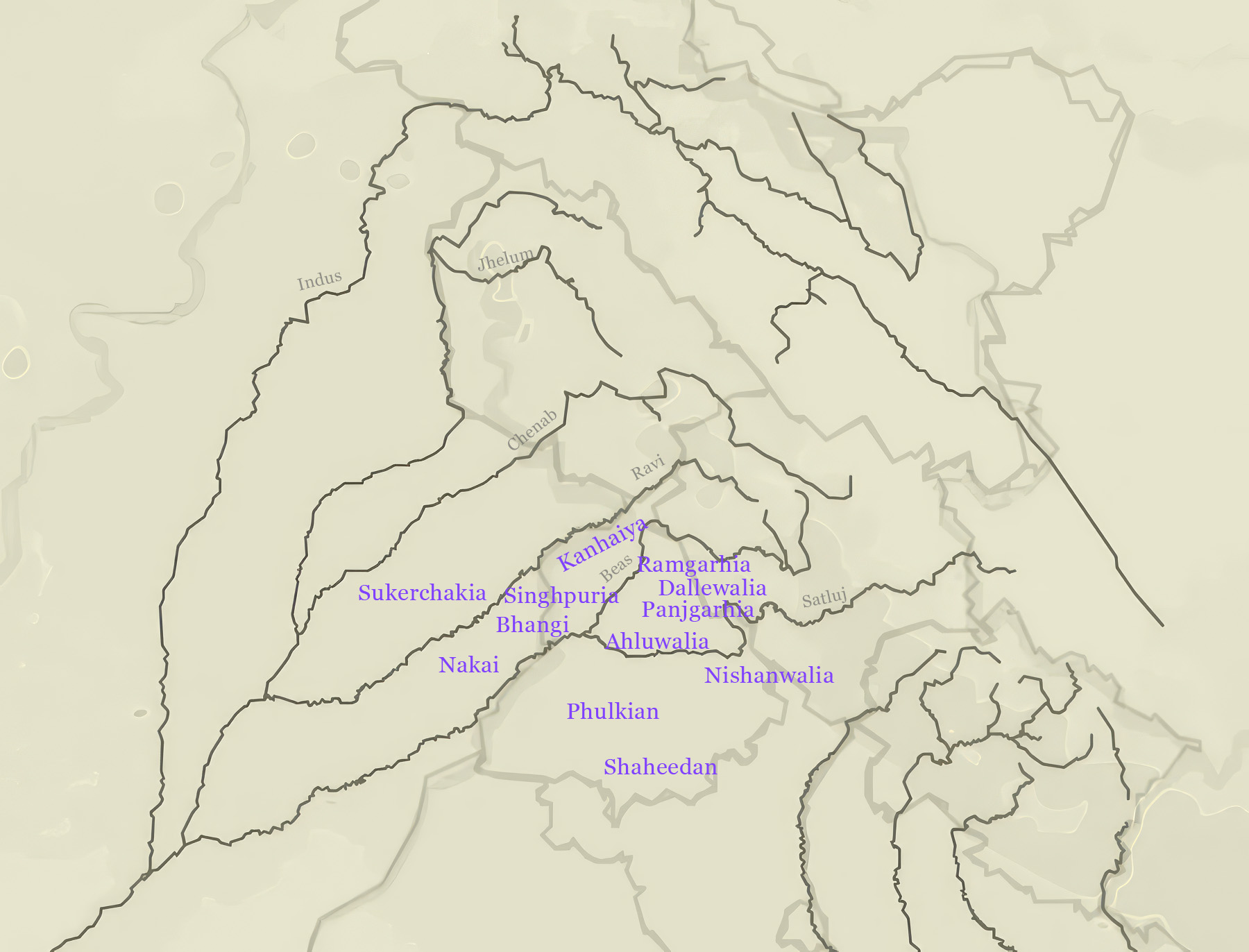
- Faizulpuria Misl within the Sikh Confederacy
- Capital: Jalandhar
- Common language: Punjabi
- Religion: Sikhism (rulers); Islam; Hinduism
- Misldar
  - 1733–1753: Kapur Singh
  - 1753–1795: Khushal Singh
  - 1795–1816: Buddh Singh
- Historical era: Early modern period
  - Established: 1733
  - Disestablished: 1816
Preceded by	Succeeded by
Mughal Empire; Durrani Empire	Sikh Empire; Cis-Sutlej states (British India)
- Today part of: Pakistan; India

Singhpuria Misl, also known as the Faizulpuria Misl, was one of the twelve misls of the Sikh Confederacy. It founded by the Sikh warrior Nawab Kapur Singh, who was born in 1697 and later became a prominent Dal Khalsa leader. The misl took its original name from a village Faizullapur in Amritsar and then changed the name of the village to Singhpura, with the misl eventually following.

== History ==
The misl was founded by Jats. Nawab Kapur Singh, a leader of the misl and its founder, fought many battles. The Battle of Sirhind (1764) was a turning point of Singhpuria Misl. After the fall of Sirhind a considerable portion of present-day Rupnagar District came under the Singhpuria Misl.

By 1769, the Singpuria Misl had the following territories in its possession:- Some parts of the districts of Jalandhar and Hoshiarpur in Doaba, Kharparkheri and Singhpura in Bari-Doab and Abhar, Adampur, Chhat, Banoor, Manauli Ghanauli, Bharatgarh, Kandhola, Chooni, Machhli Bhareli, Banga, Bela, Attal Garh and some other places in the province of Sirhind.

== Territory ==
The misl originated from Faizalpur near Amritsar. The Faizulpuria Misl controlled areas along the right-bank of the Beas river and on both banks of the Sutlej, controlling settlements such as Ludhiana, Jalandar, Nurpur, and northwestern Ambala. They Faizulpurias held territory in the Jalandhar Doab and accepted tributes from the Delhi region.

== Leaders ==
No.	Name	Portrait	References
1	Nawab Kapur Singh		
2	Khushal Singh		
3	Budh Singh		
