= Baba Darbara Singh =

Sikh leader (1644–1734)

Diwan Baba Darbara Singh
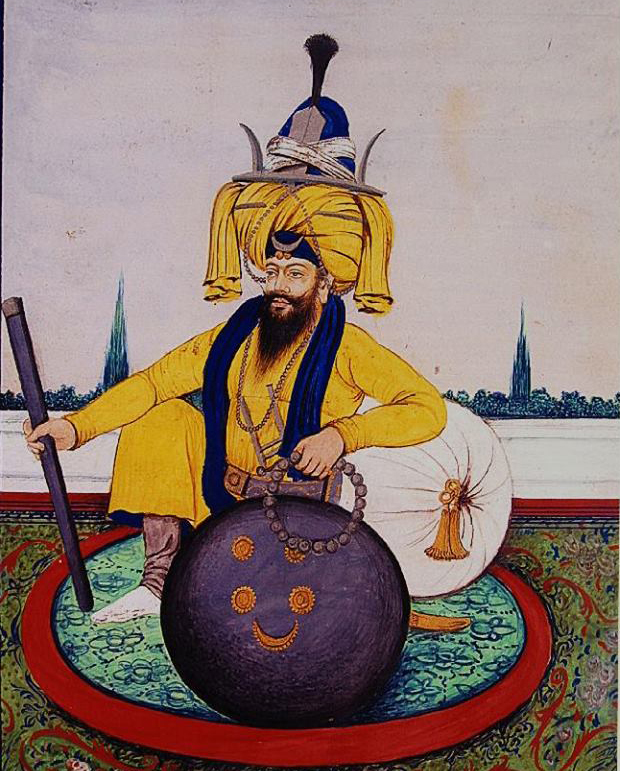

Jathedar of the Akal Takht
- In office 1722 – July 1734
- Preceded by: Mani Singh
- Succeeded by: Kapur Singh

2nd Jathedar of Buddha Dal
- In office 1716 – July 1734
- Preceded by: Binod Singh
- Succeeded by: Kapur Singh

Personal details
- Born: Darbara Singh; 1644 Dal, Panjab
- Died: July 1734 (aged 89–90)
- Relations: Baba Kalyana (grandfather); Gharbara Singh (younger brother)
- Parent: Nanu Rai (father)

Baba Darbara Singh (1644 – July 1734), also known as Diwan Darbara Singh, was second Jathedar of Budha Dal and third leader of the Akal Takht. He should not be confused with other Darbara Singh of Sirhind who fought in the Battle of Anandpur.

== Birth and family background ==
Darbara Singh was born in the village of Dal to a Khatri family as the son of Bhai Nanu Rai from Dilwali of Delhi and had a younger brother name Gharbara Singh, they belonged to the family of Guru Hargobind. He was born into a mercantile family of Sirhind. His grandfather, Baba Kalyana, had served in the forces of the Akal Sena during the guruship period of Guru Hargobind. His father, Nanu Rai, would later assist with the rescue of the severed head of Guru Tegh Bahadur in Delhi. Later, his father would undergo the Pahul in 1699 and be rechristened as 'Nanu Singh'. Nanu Singh was martyred in the Battle of Chamkaur. Darbara's younger brother, Gharbara, would be martyred in the Battle of Agampura (near Anandpur) in 1700.

== Early life ==
He entered into the service of the Guru Tegh Bahadur as a child. He learnt the martial art of Shastar Vidya from Guru Tegh Bahadur. When Guru Gobind Singh was born on 18 December 1666 in Patna, Guru Tegh Bahadur instructed Darbara to travel to Patna and from there make his way to Punjab, passing on the auspicious news to the Sikh congregations along the way. Per Sikh lore, during this time the Guru had placed a turban upon the head of the young Darbara (dastar bandi), a great honour. This is said to signify that the Guru foresaw Darbara becoming a great leader of the Sikhs in the future. He was further instructed to establish an Akhara (Indic martial training centre) in Punjab to educate many ranks of men for the upcoming battles of the Sikhs. Darbara would establish this Akhara in 1661.

When Guru Tegh Bahadur returned to the Punjab in 1670 to where Darbara and his disciples were located. After this, the Guru was accompanied by Darbara to Anandpur.

He served Guru Gobind Singh for 16 years. He underwent the Pahul ceremony and became baptized into the Khalsa order on 30 March 1699. He was a participant in the many battles of Anandpur. He also served as a warrior within the ranks of Banda Singh Bahadur's army and gained a high-level of repute while doing so. He held the rank of diwan, being the commissar in charge of rations and forage.

After the death of Banda, he worked together with other Sikh sardars of his time. Each had been assigned different roles and responsibilities, he was responsible for managing the finances of the Sikh nation.

== Leadership ==
He took-over the leadership role of the Budha Dal after Binod Singh was killed in a clash against Mughal forces in 1721.

In 1721, a young and aspiring Kapur Singh would join his jatha of Sikh warriors. However, another sources states Kapur Singh joined Darbara Singh's jatha in June 1726.

After the last-stand and martyrdom of Tara Singh Wan in 1726, many Sikhs, motivated by feelings of revenge, decided to join the jatha of Darbara Singh to fight the Mughals.

Under the leadership of Darbara Singh, the Sikhs managed to reorganize and reconvene themselves after being in disarray since the death of Banda Singh Bahadur. He did so by arranging a Sarbat Khalsa in 1726 in Amritsar. He orchestrated the guerilla attacks upon hostile forces by the Sikh jathas during the 1720s. After a Gurmatta passed under his watch, the Mughal imperial treasury was targeted for looting by the Sikhs. One such looting occurred in 1727, when Mughal royals made a stop in Sri Hargobindpur.

Many famous Sikh historical personalities were administered the Pahul under his watch.

In 1733, Zakariya Khan, the governor of Lahore province, attempted to make peace with the Sikhs and sent an envoy named Subeg Singh to meet with them. Subeg Singh offered a jagir-ship and nawab-ship to the Sikhs. According to Rattan Singh Bhangu's Panth Prakash, the Sikhs at the time held an assembly and decided to award the title of nawab to Darbara Singh but he rejected it and did not believe the Sikhs should accept a title from the Mughal government as they did not need to do so to legitimize their sovereignty as per his belief. However, the Sikh congregation overruled Darbara Singh's protest and decided to confer the title upon Kapur Singh instead, whom was also a highly-respected Sikh at the time.

== Death and succession ==
After declining the title of nawab, he remained the manager of provisions until his death in July 1734. He died aged 90 and was succeeded by Nawab Kapur Singh, whom had assisted him in his campaigns after the Mughals during his life. His year of date is recorded as either being 1734 or 1735 and a discrepancy exists within sources regarding his exact date of death. According to Giani Gian Singh, he died in 1734.

His successor, Kapur Singh, would shortly after reform the organization of the Sikh army and establish the Dal Khalsa force with its various formations.
