= Nawab Kapur Singh =

Sikh leader and warrior (1697–1753)

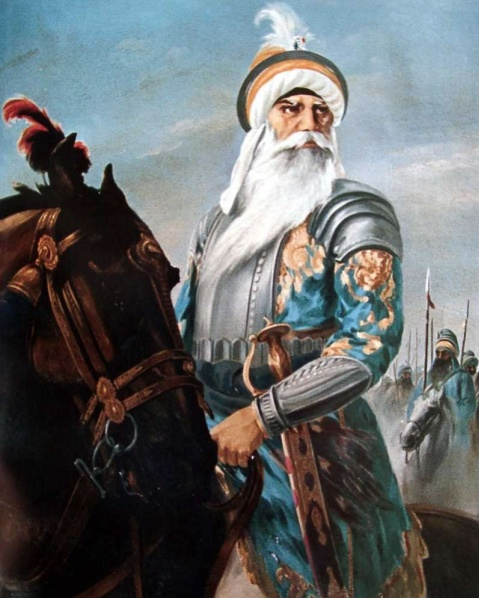
- 20th century equestrian painting of Nawab Kapur Singh

Jathedar of the Akal Takht
- In office 1737 – 9 October 1753
- Preceded by: Darbara Singh
- Succeeded by: Jassa Singh Ahluwalia

3rd Jathedar of Buddha Dal
- In office 29 March 1748 – 9 October 1753
- Preceded by: Darbara Singh
- Succeeded by: Jassa Singh Ahluwalia

Personal details
- Born: Kapur Singh; 1697 Kaloke, Lahore Subah, Mughal Empire (present-day Sheikhupura district, Punjab, Pakistan)
- Died: 9 October 1753 (aged 55–56) Amritsar, Punjab, Durrani Empire (present-day Punjab, India)
- Parent: Dalip Singh (father)

Military service
- Founder: Dal Khalsa

Nawab Kapur Singh (1697 – 9 October 1753) was a major Sikh leader who led the community during the early-to-mid 18th century. He was the organizer of the Sikh Confederacy and its military force, the Dal Khalsa. He is held in high regards by Sikhs.

== Early life ==
Kapur Singh was born into the Virk clan of Jats in 1697. His native village was Kaloke, now in the Sheikhupura district of Punjab, Pakistan. When he seized the village of Faizullapur, near Amritsar, he renamed it Singhpura and made it his headquarters. He is thus, also known as Kapur Singh Faizullapuria, and the small principality he founded, as Faizullapuria or Singhpuria.

== Initiation into the Khalsa fold ==
In 1721, Kapur‌ Singh underwent‌ amrit-initiation‌ at a large‌ gathering held at Amritsar on Vaisakhi Day, ‌from Panj Pyare led by Bhai Mani Singh.

== The title of Nawab ==
In 1733, the Mughal government decided‌, at ‌the insistence of Zakarya Khan, to revoke all repressive measures issued against the Sikhs and made an offer of a grant to them. The title of Nawab was conferred upon their leader, with a jagir consisting of the three parganas of Dipalpur, Kanganval and Jhabal.

During a Sarbat Khalsa, Baba Darbara Singh was offered to be Nawab. Since he rejected this, Kapur Singh was offered the Nawabship and he accepted.

== Formation of the Dal Khalsa ==
With the arrival of peace with the Mughals, Sikhs returned to their homes and Kapur Singh undertook the task of consolidating the disintegrated fabric of the Sikh Jathas. These were merged into a single central fighting force (The Dal) divided into two sections: the Budha Dal was the army of the veterans, and the Taruna Dal became the army of the young, led by Hari Singh Dhillon. The former was entrusted with looking after the holy places, preaching the word of the Gurus and inducting converts into the Khalsa Panth by holding baptismal ceremonies. The Taruna Dal was the more active division and its function was to fight in times of emergencies.

Kapur Singh's personality was the common link between these two wings. He was universally respected for his high character. His word was obeyed willingly and to receive baptism at his hands was counted an act of rare merit.

== Rise of the Misls ==
Under Hari Singh's leadership, the Taruna Dal rapidly grew in strength and soon numbered more than 12,000. To ensure efficient control, Nawab Kapur Singh split it into five parts, each with a separate centre. Each part had its own banner and drum, and formed the nucleus of a separate political state. The territories conquered by these groups were entered in their respective papers at the Akal Takht by Jassa Singh Ahluwalia. From these documents or misls, the principalities carved out by them came to known as Misls. Seven more groups were formed subsequently and, towards the close of century, there were altogether twelve Sikh Misls ruling the Punjab.

== Death ==
Nawab Kapur Singh requested the community to relieve him of his office, due to his old age, and at his suggestion, Jassa Singh Ahluwalia was chosen as the supreme commander of the Dal Khalsa. Kapur Singh died on 9 October 1753 at Amritsar and was succeeded by his nephew (Dhan Singh's son), Khushal Singh.

== Legacy ==
The village of Kapurgarh in Nabha is named after Nawab Kapur Singh. The derelict Manauli Fort in Mohali district was owned by his descendants.

== Battles ==
- Battle of Thikriwala (1731)
- Battle of Sunam (1735)
- Battle of Sirhind (1735)
- Battle of Basarke (1736)
- Battle of Amritsar (1738)
- Samad Khan's expedition against the Sikhs (1738)
- Skirmish of Chenab (1739)
- Battle of Kahnuwan (1746)
- Siege of Amritsar (1748)
- Battle of Kahnuwan (1752)

== See also ==
- Dal Khalsa
- Sikh Confederacy
- Jassa Singh Ahluwalia
