= Dal Khalsa (Sikh army) =

Sikh military confederation during the 18th century in Punjab

- Active: 1748–1799
- Disbanded: 1799
- Country: Sikh Confederacy; Ahluwalia Misl; Bhangi Misl; Kanhaiya Misl; Ramgarhia Misl; Singhpuria Misl; Panjgarhia Misl; Nishanwalia Misl; Sukerchakia Misl; Dallewalia Misl; Nakai Misl; Shaheedan Misl
- Allegiance: Khalsa
- Branch: Budha Dal; Tarna Dal; Akali-Nihang
- Role: Cavalry, infantry
- Part of: Misldari system
- Headquarters: Akal Takht, Amritsar
- Motto: Deg Tegh Fateh
- Colors: Dark blue, basant (xanthic)
- Equipment: Matchlock, sabres
- Wars: Mughal-Sikh Wars; Afghan-Sikh Wars

Commanders
- Commanders: Nawab Kapur Singh (founder); Baba Deep Singh; Jassa Singh Ahluwalia; Jassa Singh Ramgarhia; Baghel Singh; Darbara Singh; Charat Singh; Maha Singh
- Fighting style: Guerilla warfare
- Predecessor: Khalsa Fauj
- Successor: Sikh Khalsa Army

Dal Khalsa was the name of the combined military forces of 11 Sikh misls that operated in the 18th century (1748–1799) in the Punjab region. It was established by Nawab Kapur Singh in late 1740s.

== History ==
=== Mughal rule of Punjab ===
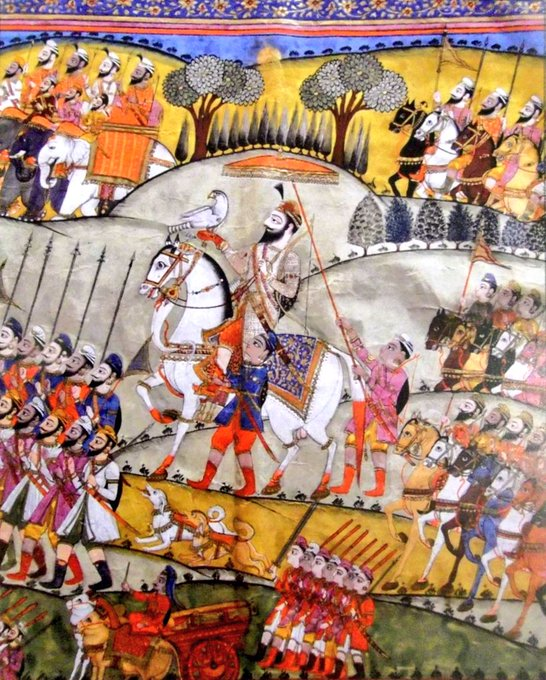
Painting of Guru Gobind Singh on horseback while marching with his army of Sikhs

The religion of Sikhism began at the time of the conquest of Northern India by Babur. His grandson, Akbar, supported religious freedom and after visiting the langar of Guru Amar Das had a favorable impression of Sikhism. As a result of his visit he donated land to the langar and had a positive relationship with the Sikh gurus until his death in 1605. His successor, Jahangir, saw the Sikhs as a political threat. He arrested Guru Arjan Dev because of Sikh support for Khusrau Mirza and ordered him to be put to death by torture. Guru Arjan Dev's martyrdom led the sixth Guru, Guru Har Gobind, to declare Sikh sovereignty in the creation of the Akal Takht and to establish a fort to defend Amritsar. Jahangir attempted to assert authority over the Sikh by jailing Guru Har Gobind at Gwalior and released him after some time with 52 other Rajput (Hindu) kings on Guru Hargobind's orders. Sikhism did not have any further issues with the Mughal Empire until the death of Jahangir in 1627. His successor, Shah Jahan "took offense" at Guru Har Gobind's sovereignty and after a series of assaults on Amritsar forced the Sikhs to retreat to the Sivalik Hills. Guru Har Gobind's successor, Guru Har Rai maintained the guruship in the Sivalik Hills by defeating local attempts to seize Sikh land and taking a neutral role in the power struggle between Aurangzeb and Dara Shikoh for control of the Timurid dynasty. The ninth Guru, Guru Tegh Bahadur, moved the Sikh community to Anandpur and traveled extensively to visit and preach in Sikh communities in defiance of Aurangzeb, who attempted to install Ram Rai to the guruship. He aided Kashmiri Brahmins in avoiding conversion to Islam and was arrested and confronted by Aurangzeb. When offered a choice between conversion or death, he chose to die rather than compromise his principles and was executed. Guru Gobind Singh, assumed the guruship in 1675 and to avoid battles with Sivalik Hill Rajas moved the guruship to Paunta. He built a large fort to protect the city and garrisoned an army to protect it. The growing power of the Sikh community alarmed Sivalik Hill Rajas who attempted to attack the city but the Guru's forces routed them at the Battle of Bhangani. He moved on to Anandpur and established the Khalsa, a collective army of baptized Sikhs on March 30, 1699. The establishment of the Khalsa united the Sikh community against various Mughal-backed claimants to the guruship. In 1701, a combined army composed of the Sivalik Hill Rajas and the Mughal army under Wazir Khan attacked Anandpur and, following a retreat by the Khalsa, were defeated by the Khalsa at the Battle of Muktsar. In 1707, Guru Gobind Singh accepted an invitation by Bahadur Shah I, Aurangzeb's successor to meet in southern India. When he arrived in Nanded in 1708, he was injured by agents of Wazir Khan, the governor of Sirhind. After this incident his wounds were stitched and he began to recover. A few days after, some Sikhs brought a very stiff bow to present to Guru Gobind Singh. As they were discussing whether anybody would ever be able to put a string on the bow, Guru Gobind Singh accepted the challenge. Though the bow was stringed, due to the force he applied on the bow the wounds which were still fresh started bleeding profusely. Guru Gobind Singh then declared that he would be leaving for heavenly abode and asked his Sikhs to prepare for the cremation.

=== Banda Singh Bahadur ===
"It is singular that these people not only behaved firmly during the execution, but they would dispute and wrangle with each other who should suffer first; and they made interest with the executioner to obtain the preference."
-Seir Mutakherin by Seid Gholam Hossein Khan

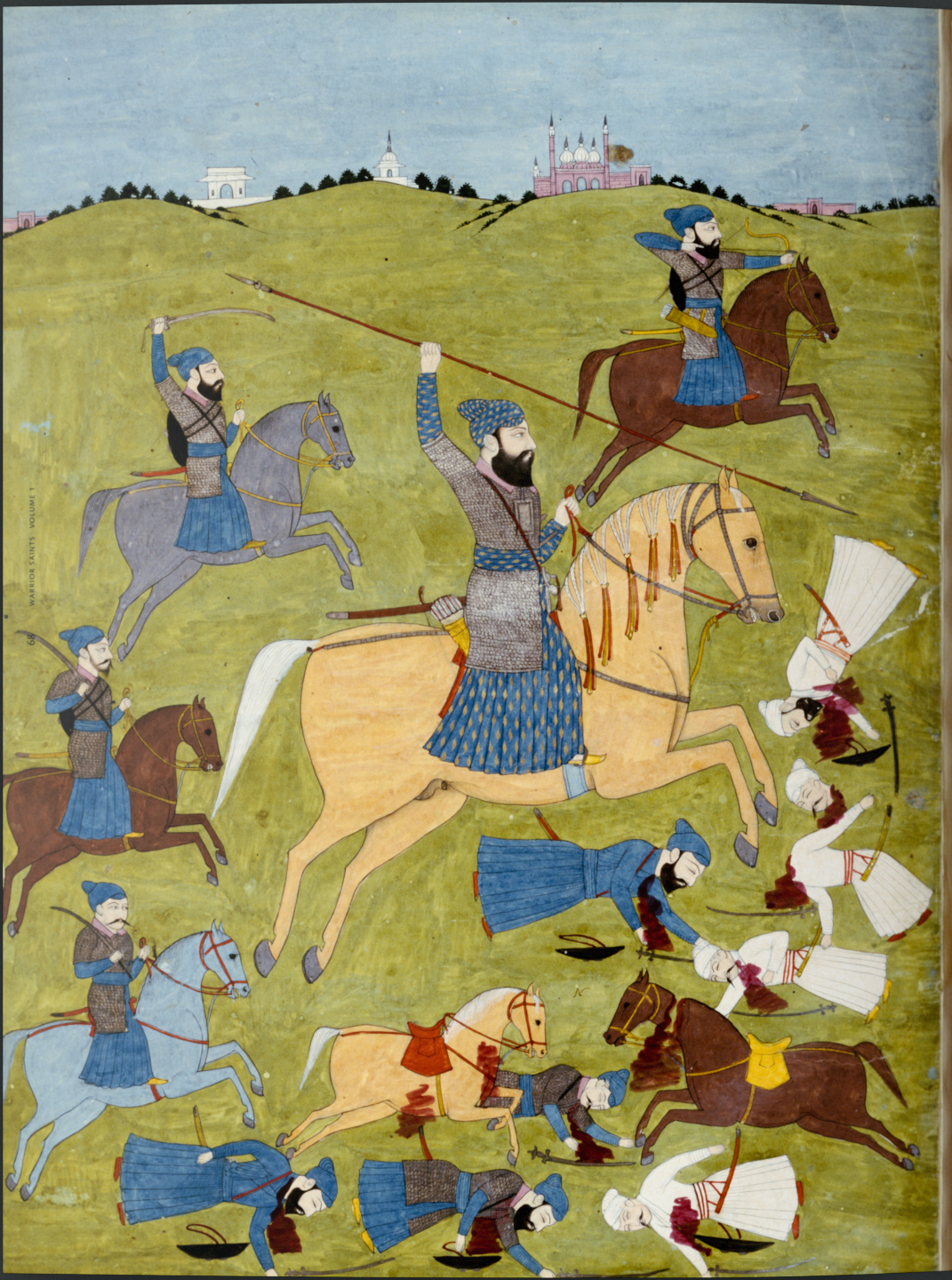
Painting from an illustrated folio of a Mughal manuscript depicting the Battle of Sirhind (1710), also known as the Battle of Chappar Chiri. From the ‘Tawarikh-i Jahandar Shah’, Awadh or Lucknow, ca.1770. The Sikh Khalsa forces are dressed in blue whilst the Mughals are wearing white

Banda Singh Bahadur was an Bairagi ascetic who converted to Sikhism after meeting Guru Gobind Singh at Nanded. A short time before his death, Guru Gobind Singh ordered him to reconquer Punjab and gave him a letter that commanded all Sikhs to join him. After two years of gaining supporters, Banda Singh Bahadur initiated an agrarian uprising by breaking up the large estates of Zamindar families and distributing the land to the poor Sikh, Hindu, and Muslim peasants who farmed the land. Banda Singh Bahadur started his rebellion with the defeat of Mughal armies at Samana and Sadhaura and the rebellion culminated in the defeat of Sirhind. During the rebellion, Banda Singh Bahadur made a point of destroying the cities in which Mughals had been cruel to Sikhs, including executing Wazir Khan in revenge for the deaths of Guru Gobind Singh's sons after the Sikh victory at Sirhind. He ruled the territory between the Sutlej river and the Yamuna river, established a capital in the Himalayas at Lohgarh, and struck coinage with the faces of Guru Nanak and Guru Gobind Singh. In 1716, his army was defeated by the Mughals after he attempted to defend his fort at Gurdas Nangal. He was captured along with 700 of his men and sent to Delhi where he was tortured and executed after refusing to convert to Islam.

=== Sivalik hills ===
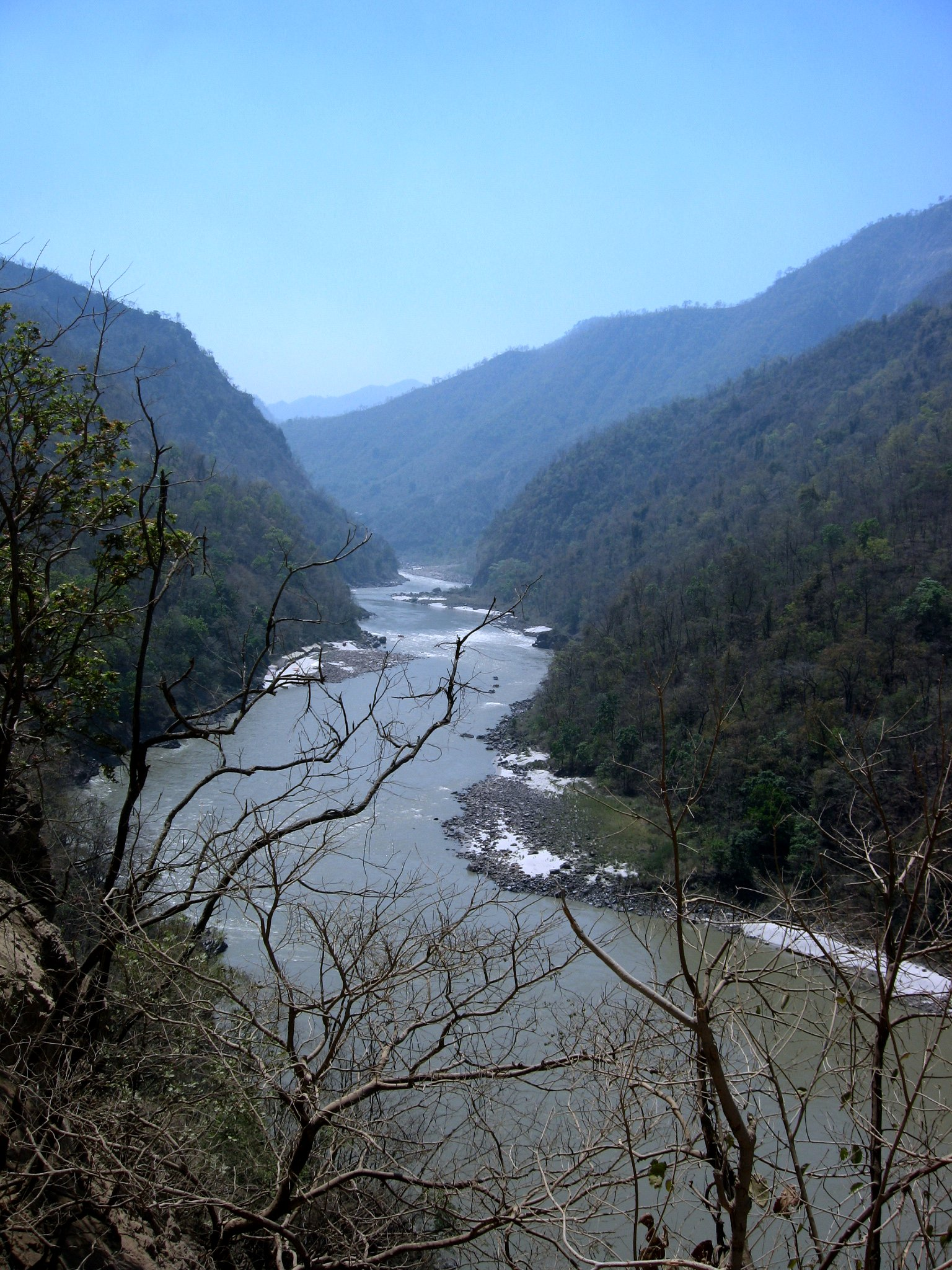
The Ganges cutting through the Sivalik Hills

After 1716, the Mughal emperor Muhammad Shah began a campaign of genocide against Sikhs through his Governor of Lahore, Abdus Samad Khan. His son and, later, successor, Zakariya Khan Bahadur led a standing army dedicated to eliminating Sikhs, executed Sikhs publicly, and offered monetary rewards for the heads of killed Sikhs. The Sikhs "retaliated by killing government functionaries and plundering Mughal posts, arsenals, and treasuries" but could not assemble an army. The persecution of the Mughal Empire forced some Sikhs to abandon the outward signs of their faith, but "the more sincere had to seek a refuge among the recesses of the hills or in the woods to the south of the Sutlej" The Sikhs went into hiding during this period. From 1718-1738, the Sikhs carried out a guerrilla war against the Mughal Empire in the area around the Sivalik Hills. Historian Josepeh Cunningham writes of the period: "The Sikhs were scarcely again heard of in history for the period of a generation".

=== Dal Khalsa ===
In 1733, Zakariya Khan Bahadur attempted to negotiate a peace with the Sikhs by offering them a jagir, the title Nawab to their leader, and unimpeded access to the Harmandir Sahib. After discussion at a Sarbat Khalsa, Kapur Singh was elected leader of the Sikhs and took the title of Nawab. Nawab Kapur Singh combined the various Sikh militias into two groups; the Taruna Dal and the Buddha Dal, which would collectively be known as the Dal Khalsa. Sikh militias over 40 years of age would be part of the Buddha Dal and Sikh militias under 40 years were part of the Taruna Dal. The Taruna Dal was further divided in five jathas, each with 1300 to 2000 men and a separate drum and banner. The area of operations of each Dal, or army, was Hari ke Pattan, where the Sutlej river and Beas River meet; the Taruna Dal would control the area east of Hari ke Pattan while the Budha Dal would control the area west of it. The purpose of the Budda Dal, the veteran group, was to protect Gurdwaras and train the Taruna Dal, while the Taruna Dal would act as combat troops. However, in 1735, the agreement between Zakariya Khan and Nawab Kapur Singh broke down and the Dal Khalsa retreated to the Sivalik Hills to regroup. Later the command of Dal Khalsa was taken by Jassa Singh Ahluwalia who was an able and powerful administrator.

==== Categorization of the Dal Khalsa ====
After 1733, the Dal Khalsa was fundamentally divided into two groups, the Buddha Dal (meaning 'the old army') and the Taruna Dal (meaning 'the young army'). Each was assigned with component Jathas (meaning 'battalions', originally referred to an armed group of Sikhs) during a meeting in Amritsar on 14 October 1745. There were around a total of twenty-five jathas established at that time (whom had been born out of a coalescing of numerous smaller, pre-existing Jathas), later their numbers swelled to sixty-five by 1748. After the Sarbat Khalsa of 1748, the numerous Jathas were rearranged and further subdivided under constituent misls as follows, which in-turn were divided between the Buddha and Taruna Dals:

- Buddha Dal
  - Ahluwalia misl
  - Dallewalia misl
  - Faizullapuria or Singhpuria misl
  - Karorasinghia or Punjgarhia misl
  - Nishanwalia misl
  - Shaheedan misl and Nihangs
- Taruna Dal
  - Bhangi misl
  - Khanaya misl
  - Nakkai misl
  - Ramgarhia misl
  - Sukarchakia misl

Note - the Phulkian misl was not part of either the Buddha nor Taruna Dal, as they were not a member of the Dal Khalsa having been excommunicated from the formation.

The leaders of the Dal Khalsa would meet twice a year at Amritsar for the Sarbat Khalsa legislature.

==== Invasion of Nader Shah ====
In 1738, Nader Shah of the Afsharid dynasty invaded Muhammad Shah's Mughal Empire. Nadir Shah defeated the Mughal Empire in the Battle of Karnal and proceeded to sack Delhi. During the panic before and after the Battle of Karnal, important functionaries of the Mughal Empire fled Delhi but were intercepted by small jathas of the Dal Khalsa and relieved of their wealth. Nadir Shah took away all the treasury, including the Peacock Throne. When Nadir Shah began his retreat, the Sikhs who had been seeking refuge in the Sivalik Hills came down from the mountains and mercilessly plundered the treasure of the Persian Army. Afterwards the Dal Khalsa established a fort at Dallewal near the Ravi river and began levying taxes in the area around Lahore. During this period, the Muslim historian Nur Mohammed, though full of contempt for Sikhs, was constrained to pay tribute to them of their character, in the following words:

"In no case they would slay a coward, nor would they put an obstacle in the way of a fugitive. They do not plunder the wealth and ornaments of a woman, be she a well to do lady or a maid servant. There is no adultery among these dogs, nor are they mischievous people given to thieving. Whether a woman is young or old, they call her 'buriya' and asked her to get out of the way. The word 'buriya' in Indian language means 'an old lady'. There is no thief at all among these dogs, nor is there any house breaker born among these miscreants. They do not make friends with adulterers and house breakers, though their behaviors on the whole is not commendable."

==== Dissolution ====
The Dal Khalsa was dissolved after the Sikh Confederacy came to an end with the conquests of Maharaja Ranjit Singh, who effectively absorbed the rest of the Misls. However, aspects of the military force lingered on and influenced the Sikh Khalsa Army of the later Sikh Empire.

== Battles fought by Sikhs ==
1. Battle of Rohilla
2. Battle of Kartarpur
3. Battle of Amritsar (1634)
4. Battle of Lahira
5. Battle of Kiratpur
6. Battle of Bhangani
7. Battle of Nadaun
8. Battle of Guler (1696)
9. Battle of Basoli
10. Battle of Anandpur (1700)
11. First siege of Anandpur
12. Battle of Nirmohgarh (1702)
13. First Battle of Anandpur (1704)
14. Second Battle of Anandpur
15. First Battle of Chamkaur (1702).
16. Battle of Sarsa
17. Second Battle of Chamkaur (1704).
18. Battle of Muktsar
19. Battle of Sonepat
20. Battle of Ambala
21. Battle of Samana
22. Battle of Chappar Chiri
23. Battle of Sadhaura
24. Battle of Rahon (1710)
25. Battle of Lohgarh
26. Battle of Jammu
27. Kapuri expedition
28. Battle of Jalalabad (1710)
29. Siege of Gurdaspur or Battle of Gurdas Nangal
30. Battle of Wan (1726)
31. Battle of Manupur
32. Siege of Ram Rauni
33. Battle of Amritsar (1757)
34. Battle of Lahore (1759)
35. Battle of Sialkot (1761)
36. Battle of Gujranwala (1761)
37. Sikh Occupation of Lahore
38. Vadda Ghalughara or Battle of Kup
39. Battle of Harnaulgarh
40. Skirmish of Amritsar (1762)
41. Battle of Sialkot (1763)
42. Battle of Sirhind (1764)
43. Battle of Chenab
44. Siege of Darbar Sahib (1764)
45. Battle of Kunjpura (1772)
46. Sikh raids on Delhi
47. Rescue of captured Girls (1769)
48. Battle of Ghanaur
49. Battle of Rohtas (1779)
50. Capture of Delhi and Red Fort (1783)
51. Battle of Amritsar (1797)
52. Battle of Amritsar (1798)
53. Battle of Lahore (1799)
54. Gurkha-Sikh War
55. Battle of Attock
56. Battle of Multan
57. Battle of Shopian
58. Battle of Balakot
59. Battle of Peshawar (1834)
60. Battle of Jamrud
61. Sino-Sikh War
62. Battle of Mudki
63. Battle of Ferozeshah
64. Battle of Baddowal
65. Battle of Aliwal
66. Battle of Sobraon
67. Battle of Chillianwala
68. Battle of Ramnagar
69. Siege of Multan
70. Battle of Gujrat
71. Battle of Saragarhi

== See also ==
- Sant Sipahi
- Miri piri
- Gatka
- Shastar Vidya
- Degh Tegh Fateh
- Dharamyudh
- Nihang
- Afghan–Sikh Wars
- Rakhi system, the payment-for-protection tax implemented and practiced by the Dal Khalsa

== Bibliography ==
- Kalsi, Sewa Singh (2005), Sikhism (Religions of the World), Chelsea House Publications, ISBN 978-0-7910-8098-6
- Markovits, Claude (2004), A history of modern India, 1480-1950, London: Anthem Press, ISBN 978-1-84331-152-2
- Jestice, Phyllis G. (2004), Holy people of the world: a cross-cultural encyclopedia, Volume 3, ABC-CLIO, ISBN 978-1-57607-355-1
- Johar, Surinder Singh (1975), Guru Tegh Bahadur, University of Wisconsin--Madison Center for South Asian Studies, ISBN 81-7017-030-3
- Singh, Pritam (2008), Federalism, Nationalism and Development: India and the Punjab Economy, Routledge, pp. 25–26, ISBN 978-0-415-45666-1
- Nesbitt, Eleanor (2005), Sikhism: A Very Short Introduction, Oxford University Press, USA, p. 61, ISBN 978-0-19-280601-7
