= Sultan Mahmud Khan =

Military commander

- Born: Gujranwala, Shukarchakia Misl, Sikh Confederacy (present-day Punjab, Pakistan)
- Died: 1859; Amritsar, Punjab, British India (present-day Amritsar, India)
- Spouse: Bibi Peeran
- Relatives: Jarnail Ghaus Khan (father); Sultan Ahmad Ali (son) Khan; Mohammed Ali Khan (son)
- Military career
- Allegiance: Sikh Empire
- Branch: Sikh Khalsa Army
- Service years: 1797-1849
- Rank: Jarnail
- Commands: Command of Artillery in Hazara
- Awards: Order of Guru Gobind Singh

Sultan Mahmud Khan (Punjabi: سلطان محمود خان, died 1859) was a Punjabi Muslim commander of the Sikh Khalsa Army, in the Sikh Empire. His derah of artillery was designated as Topkhana Sultan Mahmud. He is regarded as one of the best commanding officers of Maharaja Ranjit Singh.

He is best known for showcasing his bravery in Battle of Multan, Battle of Hairdu, Battle of Shopian and the Anglo-Sikh Wars: Battle of Ramnagar and Battle of Chillianwala, in which the Sikh army defeated the forces of Hugh Gough, 1st Viscount Gough.

== Early life ==
Mahmud Khan was born to Ghaus Khan, also known as Mian Ghausa, who served in the army of Sardar Maha Singh, chief of Sukerchakia Misl. His father was of Rajput decent while his mother was a Meo Muslim from Mewat. His ancestral village was Bharowal in Amritsar district.

== Military career ==
Mahmud Khan's military career started when he was quite young. During the Battle of Amritsar (1797), Battle of Gujrat (1797) and Battle of Amritsar (1798), he served under the then Sardar Ranjit Singh; these battles foiled the attempts of Zaman Shah Durrani to annex Punjab into his region. In 1799, Ranjit Singh and his mother-in-law, Sada Kaur liberated Lahore from the Bhangi Misl and was proclaimed the Maharaja of Punjab in 1801.

After the death of his father, he was appointed as commander of the battalion that his father previously commanded. He showed exceptional bravery during the Battle of Multan (1818) whose command was assigned to Prince Kharak Singh and his mother, Maharani Datar Kaur. Following year, he accompanied Kharak Singh in Kashmir campaigns and part took in Battle of Shopian, after which Kashmir was annexed to the Sikh Empire. After the death of Maharaja Ranjit Singh, he served under his son, Maharaja Kharak Singh.

== Later life ==
After the annexation of the Punjab into British India, Sultan Mahmud Khan retired. His jagirs were initially confiscated and he received a pension of Rs 600 which he received for the rest of his life. He died in 1859. His service jagirs were amounted to 6000 Rs. but he was only provided with Rs. 600. His son, Ahmad Ali was allotted a pension of Rs. 120.
