= Mahil Gaila =

Mahil Gehla
- Village
- Location in Punjab, India Mahil Gehla (India)
- Coordinates: 31.2056602°N 76.0158299°E
- Country: India
- State: Punjab
- District: Shaheed Bhagat Singh Nagar

Government
  - Type: Panchayat raj
  - Body: Gram panchayat

Population (2011)
  - Total: 3,403
- Sex ratio 1693/1710 ♂/♀

Languages
  - Official: Punjabi
- Time zone: UTC+5:30 (IST)
- PIN: 144506
- Telephone code: 01884
- ISO 3166 code: IN-PB
- Post office: Mahil Gailan (S.O)
- Website: nawanshahr.nic.in

Mahil Gaila (also in some instances referred to as Mahal Gehla) in the district of Jalandhar, Punjab, India is the ancestral village of the Mahal family.

The village is located in Shaheed Bhagat Singh Nagar district that comprises one of three districts of the Ropar division. Ropar is one of the five divisions of the state of Punjab. Shaheed Bhagat Singh Nagar consists of three subdivisions: Nawanshahr, Banga and Balachaur. The village is an integral part of the Banga subdivision and lies about 4 Km north-east of Banga.

The village was founded by Rawal, the earliest known ancestor. He was chieftain of the Mahal clan and a contemporary of Guru Arjundevji and Akbar the Great. He sired two sons: Bogra and Tabba. Bogra fathered four sons: Godha, Mohan, Kahan and Gaila (a.k.a. Gahlan), all of whom are credited with developing the small settlement into a viable village. Godha, the eldest of the siblings, succeeded to the chieftainship and it is his lineage that forms part of this narrative.

== Demography ==
As of 2011, Mahil Gaila has a total number of 754 houses and population of 3403 of which 1693 include are males while 1710 are females according to the report published by Census India in 2011. The literacy rate of Mahil Gaila is 77.71%, higher than the state average of 75.84%. The population of children under the age of 6 years is 335 which is 9.84% of total population of Mahil Gaila, and child sex ratio is approximately 948 as compared to Punjab state average of 846.

As per the report published by Census India in 2011, 1093 people were engaged in work activities out of the total population of Mahil Gaila which includes 920 males and 173 females. According to census survey report 2011, 86.73% workers describe their work as main work and 13.27% workers are involved in Marginal activity providing livelihood for less than 6 months.

Major-General A. E. Barstow claims: "Mahils -these trace their descent from the Tur Rajputs and came from Delhi. The clan holds Shahpuri Khurd and Kalan, also Namol in the Sunam tahsil and Khanpur in Dhuri.

== Sources of family history ==
Sampuran Singh (1860-1942) is the fount on the founding of the village and its founding fathers. In his capacity as ‘zaildar’ Sampuran compiled his family history and tree from four principal sources on which Jats of Punjab rely to trace family history, namely:

1. From "Mirasi', a word derived from the Arabic word (ميراث miras), which means the keepers of the family tree.

2. From "Patwari'( in Urdu پٹواری), a village registrar of land responsible for keeping land records. It was a concept introduced in India by Sher Shah Suri, and was further enhanced by Emperor Akbar.

3. From “Wajib-ul Arz” - a record of the particulars of the administration of a village, specifying the names of the occupants and all circumstances connected with their occupancy.

4. From Genealogy registers maintained by Brahmin Pandits at Haridwar arranged by district, village, caste and recording all relevant information about the family (native residence, names of family members, ceremony performed and so no). These records trace family history for over twenty prior generations.

Additional details and information about family history are gleaned from two of Sampuran's grandsons, Dr. Harbans Singh (son of Dasondha Singh) and Madhusudan Singh (son of Ujagar Singh), who had access to family and village archives. Additionally, Dr. Harbans Singh is chiefly instrumental in constructing the family tree and line of lineage.

== Original homeland ==
During the 16th century Mahal clan comprising several close-knit distinct families lived in Sirsa district that comprised about 200 villages. Sirsa was one of the dasturs (from Persian word دستور meaning administrative unit) of Hisar-Feroza-Sarkar. It lies midway heavily traveled route between Delhi, the Mogul capital, and Lahore Punjab's capital. It was home to a scattering of a few high ranking Mogul ‘darbaris’ (Urdu Word درباری meaning courtier) and administrators who had built elegant mahals (a word derived from Persian wordمح meaning palace).

Mahal families were engaged in agriculture with a retinue made up of a priest, tradesmen (e.g. carpenter) and marasi. The priest from Brahmin caste was a family retainer, who advised the Mahal elders on all kinds of auspicious or ominous events and performed the requisite rituals or ceremonies e.g. marriages, location and building of a new home, funeral and so on.

== Family Honour ==
The villages inhabited by the Mahals were in the path of a high ranking ‘darbari’ (Urdu Word درباری) in Mogul Emperor Akbar's court who owned an opulent mansion (Mahal) nearby. One day while passing through on his way to Delhi the Mogul ‘darbari’ chanced upon a beautiful maiden, daughter of a well-respected member of the Mahal clan, and was immediately smitten with love. The Muslim noble sought the hand of the Mahal damsel.

Father of the girl found himself in a moral quandary as tribal codes expressly forbade exogamous marriages (marrying outside tribe). Mahal tribe lived in a culture of family izzet (from Persian عزت meaning honour), central to which idea is that actions or behavior of one member reflects on the reputation of the family and the clan. The Brahmin priest, too, warned against any liaison whatever with a Muslim family who believe in cow-slaughter. For a highly respected Mogul ‘darbari’ it, too, was a question of izzet (honour) to have his offer rejected. Mahal elders feared their refusal may result in punitive measures such as confiscation of property or at worse trumped up charges of treason. The clan was in a no-win situation.

The clan empathized with the family of the girl. Prompted by fierce tribal bonding the clan hatched a plan in great secrecy to resolve their dilemma. The father was to acquiesce to the wedding on the condition that the ‘baraat’ (Urdu word بارات meaning groom's party) is restricted to immediate members of the family. The ‘baraat’ was to be encamped just outside the village with the periphery fringed with dry brushwood in a protective but decorative style.

The ‘baraat’ arrived on the eve of the wedding, was warmly greeted, and left alone to rest. At a pre-arranged signal, as the ‘baraat’ slept, the brushwood was set ablaze. Soon the camp site was engulfed in flames. In the shouting and screaming a few of wedding guests tried to escape but were felled by the Mahal youth. The entire ‘baraat’ died in the inferno.

Meanwhile, the second leg of the plan was set in motion. The Mahal clan, and their retainers, had already packed all their belongings on oxen carts and ready to move. In the dead of night on hearing the word of the slaughter of the ‘baraat’ the exodus got under way intending to move a large distance away to avoid capture.

== Putting down roots ==
The caravan led by Mahal chieftain Rawal and his two sons, Bogra and Tabba, headed in a northerly direction bypassing Sangrur and Ludhiana . At a place about 50 Km north-east of Ludhiana the caravan set camp by the banks of a ‘talaab’ (Urdu word تالاب meaning pond). The site was on high ground with clear views of the surrounding land and villages. The clan found the topography of the area and nearness to water made the camp-site an ideal place to start life anew.

The clan turned to the Brahmin for an auspicious signal. The Brahmin hinted an occurrence of a spectacular event to decide the issue. Wolves were fairly common in the area. The Brahmin suggested that a lone goat be tied to a tree, a little away from the camp, and if it was to survive the night then that shall be the place to put down roots. So it came to pass that in the still of the night a wolf stormed the goat. It so happened that the goat was in late pregnancy. It kept on charging at the wolf with its long, pointed horns. Eventually, the wolf gave up and went away. It was thus the Mahal clan chose the site for the founding of their ancestral village.

Rawal, the acknowledged leader, drove a 6' wooden stake into the pond to mark the laying of the foundation of the new settlement. Land was cleared of brushwood and trees. After passing of Rawal, Bogra, the elder of his two sons, took over the task of developing the land. Over time, under his sons, the settlement grew into a fully-fledged village.

== Naming the village ==
As the village grew, it needed to be named. The usual custom is for the village to take the name of the oldest member of the clan. Although Godha was the oldest, it was the charismatic Gaila, the youngest of siblings, who inspired others and who had gradually attained legitimacy of authority. The Brahmin, too, indicated that Gaila's horoscope indicated his name was the most propitious to the growth of the new village. It was thus that the village got its name: Mahil/Mahal (tribe); Gehlan (founding clan member).

Gaila died prematurely, unwed and issueless.

== Embracing Sikhism ==
While Mahals, descendants of Indo-Scythian stock, followed no particular belief system, they observed customs, rituals and rites of the dominant Hindu population. When the Mahals embraced Sikhism is unknown. It is highly probable that Bihari, great-great-grandson of Rawal, a contemporary of Guru Gobind Singh, may have been the first of the clan to adopt the Sikh faith. He was drawn to the faith like hundreds of thousands of Jat peasants in the Punjab who embraced the faith captivated by Guru's doctrine of rectitude and egalitarianism.

== Misldar ==
The village lay not too distant from the route along which, between 1748–1767 BCE, Afghan King Ahmed Shah Abdali marched his forces on pillaging incursions of northern India.

During 18th century Sikhs had formed twelve highly mobile guerrilla bands or jathas (misls), garrisoned in mountain and forest fastnesses, and although they owned no territory they had carved between themselves spheres of control. They lived on pillage of Mughal treasury and were chief irritants to Durrani whose booty-laden Afghan caravans they ambushed and looted.

The village was within the ambit of sphere of control of the Dallewalia misl. Dallewalia misl, one of the twelve misls, was founded by Sardar Gulab Singh of Dalewal village, situated about 20 Km south-west of Banga and about 15 Km south of Phagwara.

Bahal Singh great-great-great-grandson of Bihari, who led his own squad, was one of the sardars in the Dallewalia misl.

== Leasing land to tenant farmers ==
Sometimes towards the end of the 19th century, Jaimal Singh, who held the rank of ‘zaildar’, was granted land by the British in the Chunian Colony, situated in the southern part of the Lahore district. He was one of the grantees to be allotted land as the British undertook the project to transform barren, arid tracts of Punjab into commercial agriculture by development of canal irrigation (named “Punjab Canal Colonies”). Jats, belonging to the richest sections of the Sikh peasantry, obtained three-quarters of allotted land. Jaimal was allotted two ‘murabbas’ (from Urdu Word مربع – a land measure = 25 acres) known as ‘peasant’ grants. Soon after succeeding his father as ‘zaildar’, Sampuran Singh was granted two ‘murabbas’ as reward for his able administration.

In meetings with British administrator in his capacity as ‘zaildar’, Sampuran Singh required the services of a translator. That convinced him importance of education in English schooling. His schooling, inherited from Mogul rule, focused on teaching of arithmetic and courtier's language, which was Urdu or ‘Farsi’ (modern Persian language). The British, too, promoted education in English to create a pool of educated Indians who could assist them in the administration. They opened a few English elementary and high schools in larger villages and a few colleges in cities and towns. Thus, children of the Mahal clan receive their education in English schools and colleges. It also broadened their horizon. They chose to build their careers in British administration or the army that gave preference to Sikh recruitment.

Since none of Sampuran's children wished to work the farm, and as his landholdings grew, he had no choice but to begin to gradually disengage from actively working the fields and lease his land to tenant farmers.

== Mahal Diaspora ==
Sampuran Singh,

Sampuran Singh Mahal (1860-1942)

born circa 1860, who succeeded his father as ‘zaildar', was the most prominent patriarch, widely known and respected throughout the group of villages under his administration. He sired three sons Ujagar Singh (1881-1969), Dasondha Singh (1883-1968) and Dhanna Singh (1886-1964).

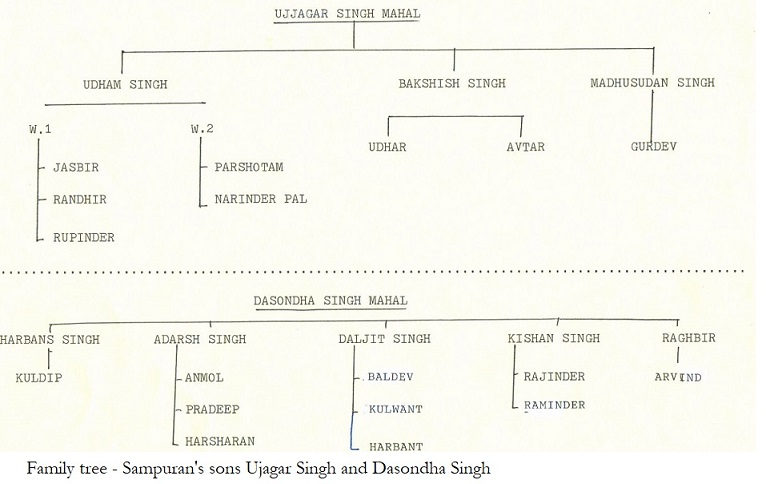

Today, none of Sampuran's progeny are to be found in their ancestral village. At different times and with own particular circumstances and promptings of the times they sold their land and property to relocate to other lands and countries. In some cases some even abandoned their homes. They are scattered all around the world.

Of his three sons, Ujagar Singh's younger two college educated sons left the village permanently to take up professions in other provinces of India. All of Ujagar's descendants migrated to California.

All of the descendants of Dasondha Singh migrated to different states in the USA (NY State, New Jersey, Washington and California).

The descendants of Dhanna Singh are more widespread—settled in UK, Germany, Australia, and Canada. His grandson Bhupinder, was the first of the Mahal clan to be born overseas (Uganda).

The exodus from the village began in 1927 when Sampuran's grandson Amar Singh Mahal (1907-1990), son of Dhanna Singh, chose to migrate to Kenya. In the mid-1980s, Sampuran's grandson, Udham Singh, son of Ujagar Singh, frail and old, went to live with his son in California and became the last one to abandon the village. Over a span of six decades all of Sampuran Singh's descendants had abandoned their ancestral village and migrated to other lands and countries.
