= Ranjit Singh's second Cis-Sutlej campaign =

- Part of Ranjit Singh's campaigns in the Cis-Satluj region
| Date | 27 August – 26 September 1807 |
| Location | Cis-Satluj region |
| Result | Ranjit Singh victory: Cis-Satluj chiefs submitted to Ranjit Singh's authority |
| Territorial changes | Jagraon, Naraingarh, Morinda, Zira, Kot Kapura, Dharamkot, Ghumgrana seized. |

Belligerents
| Sikh Empire; Allied Cis-Satluj chiefs | Patiala State; Kaithal State; Nahan State; Dallewalia Misl; Nishanwalia Misl |

Commanders and leaders
| Ranjit Singh; Diwan Mohkam Chand; Fateh Singh Ahluwalia; Garbha Singh; Fateh Singh Kalianwala †; Tara Singh Ghaiba (WIA) | Sahib Singh of Patiala; Rani Aus Kaur; Lal Singh of Kaithal; Mian Kishan Singh of Naraingarh; Gopal Singh of Mani Majra; Ranjit Singh of Manauli; Hari Singh of Sialbah; Nihal Singh of Morinda; Deva Singh of Rupar |

Strength
| 30,000 horse | Unknown |

Casualties and losses
| About 400 killed at Naraingarh | Naraingarh garrison put to the sword |

Ranjit Singh's second Cis-Sutlej campaign, also known as the Second Malwa campaign, was an expedition by Ranjit Singh into the Cis-Sutlej region in 1807. It began on 27 August, when he crossed the Beas and Sutlej at Harike, and ended on 26 September, when he crossed back over the Sutlej. The campaign followed another dispute within Patiala and extended to Jagraon, Kaithal, Naraingarh, Morinda, Rupar and Rahon.

Ranjit Singh reached Patiala on 5 September 1807. He received money, jewellery and a gun from Patiala, accepted the submission of several Cis-Sutlej chiefs, took tribute from Kaithal, besieged Naraingarh, and imposed payments during his return march. The campaign, together with the expedition of 1806, left him with control or influence over many villages and chiefs between the Yamuna and the Sutlej.

== Background ==
In 1807, the conflict between Sahib Singh of Patiala and Rani Aus Kaur widened into open hostility, with court officials taking opposing sides. Aus Kaur, supported by her party at court and by Bhag Singh of Jind and Jaswant Singh of Nabha, invited Ranjit Singh to intervene on behalf of herself and her young son Karam Singh against Sahib Singh. Both the Raja and Rani of Patiala invited Ranjit Singh to intervene on agreed terms.

The expedition followed Ranjit Singh's first intervention in the Cis-Sutlej region in 1806.

== Campaign ==
=== Crossing and Jagraon ===
The Beas and Sutlej were in flood when Ranjit Singh began the campaign. He crossed the rivers at Harike on 27 August 1807. His army was accompanied by Diwan Mohkam Chand, Fateh Singh Ahluwalia and Garbha Singh. He seized Jagraon from Ahmad Khan Gujar and gave it to Fateh Singh Ahluwalia for a nazarana of Rs. 40,000.

=== Patiala settlement ===
Ranjit Singh reached Patiala on 5 September 1807. By then, Sahib Singh and Aus Kaur had reconciled. Ranjit Singh maintained that the reconciliation did not cancel the promised payments and cannon, since the expedition had already cost him heavily.

Sahib Singh handed over the Kare Khan gun. (Note: The gun is called Kare Khan in Gupta and Kara Khan in Singh.) The gun was named from two large iron rings on its mouth and had been taken from Sirhind in 1764. Aus Kaur presented a casket of jewellery worth Rs. 70,000 and Rs. 30,000 in cash. The jewellery included a rare pearl necklace.

At the time of Ranjit Singh's departure, Aus Kaur instructed her ten-year-old son Karam Singh to salute him. Ranjit Singh placed the child in his lap, and Karam Singh held the necklace around Ranjit Singh's neck and asked for it back. Ranjit Singh offered other gifts, but the child continued to hold the necklace, and Ranjit Singh returned it. Ranjit Singh then granted a khilat to Sahib Singh and promised friendship to Sahib Singh and Aus Kaur.

=== Kaithal and Naraingarh ===
Most Cis-Sutlej chiefs submitted to Ranjit Singh at Patiala. Lal Singh of Kaithal and Mian Kishan Singh of Naraingarh were the main exceptions. Ranjit Singh moved toward Kaithal after the Patiala settlement. Lal Singh offered Rs. 12,000 and one elephant.

Ranjit Singh then turned toward Naraingarh. Naraingarh had been seized by Jassa Singh Ahluwalia in 1764. After Jassa Singh Ahluwalia's death in 1783, the Raja of Nahan captured it and placed it under Kishan Singh, a member of the ruling family. Kishan Singh built a strong fort with a deep and wide ditch.

Fateh Singh Ahluwalia asked Ranjit Singh to recover Naraingarh for him. Ranjit Singh invested the fort but failed to take it by storm. The garrison resisted strongly. Fateh Singh Kalianwala was killed, Tara Singh Ghaiba was wounded, and about 400 men of Ranjit Singh's force were killed. Tara Singh Ghaiba died on the return march at Morinda.

Mian Kishan Singh escaped into the hills. The garrison was killed, the fort was razed, and Naraingarh was made over to Fateh Singh Ahluwalia for Rs. 40,000.

=== Return march ===
Ranjit Singh returned by way of Raipur Rani, Ramgarh and Mani Majra. He exacted Rs. 30,000 from Gopal Singh of Mani Majra, Rs. 20,000 from Ranjit Singh of Manauli, and Rs. 15,000 from Hari Singh of Sialbah. Morinda was seized from Nihal Singh and given to Bhag Singh of Jind. At Rupar, Ranjit Singh received Rs. 12,000 from Deva Singh.

Ranjit Singh crossed the Sutlej on 26 September 1807 and seized Rahon, the headquarters of Tara Singh Ghaiba. Several sardars attending him presented Rs. 80,000.

The campaign also included the seizure of territories connected with the Dallewala chief in the Doab and the occupation of territories of the Nishanwala Misl. Ghumgrana, Morinda in Sirhind, Zira, Kot Kapura and Dharamkot were also seized. Kot Kapura was held by the Buria family, while Dharamkot had belonged to the deceased Tara Singh Ghaiba. In March 1808, Diwan Mohkam Chand captured Patoki and part of Wadhni, which were assigned to Rani Sada Kaur for an annual payment of Rs. 15,000.

== Territorial settlement ==
The two Malwa expeditions produced territorial acquisitions with annual revenue assessed at Rs. 400,518. These included the pargana of Ludhiana and parts of Rahimabad, Sirhind, Tahara, Burna, Pyub and Rahoo, as well as the taluqs of Ghumgrana, Shergarh, Dharamkot, Jagraon, Jhandput, Kot, Chandpur, Talwandi and Dhanaur. Ranjit Singh retained little of the conquered territory and distributed much of it among his followers and the Cis-Sutlej Sikh chiefs.

Bhag Singh of Jind received 90 villages with annual revenue of Rs. 41,700 in the parganas of Ludhiana and Sirhind and in the taluqs of Jandiala, Kot Jagraon, Busia, Talwandi and Jagraon. Jaswant Singh of Nabha received 38 villages with annual revenue of Rs. 30,040 in the taluqs of Kot, Talwandi, Basia and Jagraon. Fateh Singh Ahluwalia received 106 villages in Dhaka, Kot, Basia, Jagraon and Talwandi, with annual revenue of Rs. 40,505. Gurdit Singh of Ladwa received 32 villages in Baddowal, Jagraon and Ghumgrana.

Diwan Mohkam Chand received 102 villages in Zira, Kot Kapura and Dharamkot, worth Rs. 68,900 annually. Garbha Singh received 62 villages in Dharamkot with annual revenue of Rs. 22,634. Karam Singh Nagla received 36 villages in Ghumgrana worth Rs. 23,415 annually. Other grants went to Basant Singh, Jodh Singh Runsia, Attar Singh, Jodh Singh Kalsia and a second entry recorded under Basant Singh. Patiala received no share of the spoils.

== Aftermath ==
The expeditions of 1806 and 1807 gave Ranjit Singh de facto suzerainty over the Sikh chiefs of the Cis-Sutlej region. Most of the chiefs paid tribute, while some lost all or part of their estates. The Phulkian chiefs offered nazarana as a token of allegiance. The chiefs of Malerkotla, Kaithal, Buria, Shahabad and Kalsia, along with the Rani of Ambala, paid tribute.

The grants to Cis-Sutlej rulers carried conditions and involved acceptance of Ranjit Singh's supreme authority. During Metcalfe's negotiations with Ranjit Singh, Lahore's claim of suzerainty over all Cis-Sutlej chiefs was based on these grants. Charles Metcalfe, then employed in the Delhi Residency, considered that British acceptance of Ranjit Singh's claim over the Cis-Sutlej Sikh chiefs would make little practical difference, since Ranjit Singh had already acquired suzerainty between the Yamuna and the Sutlej.

The conquests of the two expeditions remained largely unnoticed by the British government until 1809, when Ochterlony submitted his report on the Sikh country. British authorities had accepted the Resident's view that Ranjit Singh's proceedings would not disturb the tranquillity of the Doab. The British government was not interested in extending its authority beyond the Yamuna at that time.

== Bibliography ==
- Gupta, Hari Ram (1978). History of the Sikhs: The Sikh Lion of Lahore, Maharaja Ranjit Singh, 1799–1839. History of the Sikhs. Vol. 5 (3rd, illustrated ed.). Munshiram Manoharlal. ISBN 9788121505154.
- Hasrat, Bikrama Jit (1977). Life and Times of Ranjit Singh: A Saga of Benevolent Despotism. V. V. Research Institute Book Agency.
- Hasrat, Bikrama Jit (1968). Anglo-Sikh Relations, 1799–1849: A Reappraisal of the Rise and Fall of the Sikhs. V. V. Research Institute Book Agency.
- Singh, Ajmer (1997). Military Campaigns of Maharaja Ranjit Singh and Under His Successors (PDF) (PhD thesis). Panjab University Chandigarh.
