= Singhanwala =

Singhanwala Singhan Wala
- Village
- Nickname: sheran da pind
- Location in Punjab, India Singhanwala (India)
- Coordinates: 30.7699°N 75.1218°E
- Country: India
- State: Punjab
- District: Moga

Government
  - Sarpanch: Nachatter Singh Gill

Population
  - Total: 15,000

Languages
  - Official: Punjabi
- Time zone: UTC+5:30 (IST)

Singhanwala is a village six kilometres (3.7 mi) from Moga, Punjab, India. The village population is approximately 15,000. It is believed that Dasaundha Singh and Sangat Singh founded the village of Singhanwala. The Nishanwalia Misl, one of the 12 Sikh Misls was based here during the 18th century. The misl participated in several battles against Mughal forces, including the Battle of Sirhind. Gurdev Singh Sidhu served as the village head for 25 years. Sardar Nachatter Singh Gill served for 10 years. Balvir Singh is the sarpanch (village head) since 2003.

== Education ==
The village does not have a 10+2 school. Many parents cannot afford to send their teenagers to schools in the city. Therefore, the generation lacks continued education. Private schools like Genius School and Kalangidhar School do not have facilities to teach higher classes. Like many villages, only higher income families can provide a good education for their kids.

== Sikhism ==
There are multiple Gurdwaras in the village. These include Bhai Mohar Singh, Bhai Seva Singh, Gurudwara Sahib in Chand Patti (Area), and Gurudwara Sangeet Vidiyala. There are a total of five clubs in the village. These consist of the following: Bhai Mohar Singh youth club, Ekta Welfare Youth Club, Baba Jiwan Singh Club, Ma Chintpurni Club and Shaheed Bhagat Singh youth club.

== Nishanwalia Misl ==
The Misl was founded by Dasaundha Singh Shergill a leader of Tarna Dal. The misl was formed on 29 March 1748. The leaders of this Misl used to carry the blue nishans (the flags) of the Sikh army during the battles; hence their name became Nishanwalia. The Misl held a commanding number of cavalry units, estimated to be around 12,000 units according to historical accounts. Singhanwala was the residence of many prominent Nishanwalia Misldars, including Dasaundha Singh, Sangat Singh, and his sons. It is believed that Dasaundha Singh and Sangat Singh were the founders of the village. They had established the town of Ambala as their capital initially, building a protective wall around it, before eventually shifting to Singhanwala due to climate and water quality issues. Gurdwara Bhai Mohar Singh Ji is also situated in this village and serves as a memory to Bhai Mohar Singh, the son of Misldar Sangat Singh Nishanwalia.
