= Sardar Gulab Singh =

Sikh warrior

Sardar Gulab Singh was the founder of Dallewalia Misl, one of the sovereign states of the Sikh confederacy that rose during the 18th century in the Punjab region. The Dallewalia and Nishanwalia Misl were stationed as a reserve force at Amritsar to protect the holy city and tackle any emergency. The Amritsar and the Punjab region was subject to raids by the Afghans led by Ahmad Shah Abdali therefore the Sikhs had created misls to defend the Punjab region and push back the invaders.

== Early life ==
Gulab Singh was the son of Shardha Ram of village Dallewal Since Gulab Singh was a resident of the village of Dallewal, hence the name of his misl that was established near Dera Baba Nanak, in Doaba Bist Jalandhar. He had a grocery store in his village Dallewal (also called Bora Dalla) where all his goods were stolen by thieves and this incident made him rebel against the Mughal administration. As a middle-aged man with a family to feed, he moved to Amritsar where he trained under Nawab Kapur Singh and became a Sikh after baptism.

=== Pahul ===
In 1726, Nawab Kapur Singh administered pahul to Gulab Singh on Diwali at Amritsar. Sikhs regarded Nawab Kapur Singh as a leader and general par excellence. He was the organizer of Dal Khalsa and an integral link between two sections of the Nihang Sikhs, Budha dal (veterans-handling administrative functions, taking care of missionary work, Gurudwaras, and protection of religion) and Taruna Dal (the young group-fighters, defenders, and protectors of the community).

==== Taruna Dal ====
Gulab Singh became an active member of the taruna dal by late 1726 A.D. and launched into a chivalry career, fighting against Punjab's oppressive Mughal government. Initially, he was having 10-15 companions and commenced plundering slowly; he added 150 comrades. One day, he attacked Jalandhar and, won big booty, returned safely to their jungle camp.

=== Dallewalia Misl ===
In 1748, Gulab Singh was declared to be the head of the Dallewalias Misl with two deputies Gurdyal Singh and Tara Singh Ghaiba.

Detail of the Dallewalia Misl
SN	Name	Founding Clan	Capital	Key Leaders	Strength in Regular Horseman (1780)	Misl Period Territory by 1759	Corresponding Current Area
1	Dallewalia Misl	Khatri	Sardar Gulab Singh and Sardar Tara Singh Ghaiba	5,000	Nakodar, Talwan, Badala, Rahon, Phillaur, Ludhiana etc.	Ludhiana district, Jalandhar district	

== Death ==
Gulab Singh lost his life in 1759 at the Battle of Kalanaur by the forces of Zain Khan Sirhindi. Hence the command of the misl came to Sardar Gurdiyal Singh and later it was headed by Sardar Tara Singh Ghaiba.

== See also ==
- Dallewalia Misl
- Sardar Tara Singh Ghaiba
