= Battle of Gujrat (1797) =

- Part of the Afghan–Sikh Wars
Date	29 April – 2 May 1797
Location	Gujrat, Punjab, Pakistan
Result	Sikh victory

Belligerents
Sikh Confederacy; Shaheedan Misl; Sukerchakia Misl; Ahluwalia Misl; Kanhaiya Misl; Ramgarhia Misl; Dallewalia Misl; Bhangi Misl	Durrani Empire

Commanders and leaders
Ram Singh Bedi †; Ranjit Singh; Bhag Singh Ahluwalia; Jaimal Singh Kanhaiya; Jodh Singh Ramgarhia; Tara Singh Ghaiba; Sahib Singh Bhangi	Ahmad Khan Shahanchibashi †; Kamil Din; Murid Khan; Asadullah; Ali Khan

Strength
Unknown	12,000 cavalry

Casualties and losses
1,500 Sikhs killed	3,000 Afghans killed

The Battle of Gujrat (1797) was fought between the forces of the Durrani Empire led by Ahmad Khan Shahanchibashi and the Sikh forces led by various Sardars. After Zaman Shah's third failed invasion of Punjab, he left Shahanchibashi as governor of the Rohtas Fort and the region between the Jhelum and Indus rivers. Known for his oppressive rule and ambition to conquer Gujrat, Shahanchibashi faced a holy war organized by Ram Singh Bedi. After recruiting Sikhs for the war, the Sikh and Durrani forces clashed in Gujrat, where the Sikhs emerged victorious and plundered the defeated Afghans.

== Background ==
In 1796, Shah Zaman crossed the Indus River to move closer to Delhi, commanded by a well-equipped army of over 30,000 troops. Sikh chiefs gathered in Amritsar and relocated their families to the hills as news of the invasion spread. Sher Muhammad Khan Wazir led 12,000 soldiers into Lahore on December 31, 1796, and Shah Zaman arrived in Lahore on January 1, 1797. The Muslim community embraced him, while Hindu store owners showed little emotion. Shah Zaman led a large force to Amritsar, engaging in a bloody battle with the Sikhs in which the latter came out victorious. The defeated Durrani soldiers and Shah Zaman fell to Lahore. Mahmud Shah Durrani, Shah Zaman's brother, revolted against him and started his return route to Kabul, leaving Ahmad Khan Shahanchibashi in command of 12,000 Afghan soldiers in the Punjab.

=== Shahanchibashi's plan ===
At Rohtas Fort, Ahmad Khan Shahanchibashi, was the Durrani governor of the Sindh Sagar Doab. His command was to arrest and bring back to Kabul all Sikhs who were attempting to cross into his domain. Upon the Shah's retreat, the Sikh chiefs were in the process of reclaiming their territories. Ranjit Singh was preparing to seize Rohtas, whereas Milkha Singh arrived in Gujrat with Sahib Singh to continue on to Rawalpindi shortly thereafter. Hayat Khan, the son of Chaudhri Rahmat Khan Waraich of Jalalpur, seized the Islamgarh fort and initiated a rebellion against Sahib Singh of Gujrat. Shahanchibashi resolved to remove the Sikh sardars from Gujrat. Leaving his women in the fortress of Rohtas under the protection of Ilyas Khan, he crossed the Jhelum River at the head of 12,000 cavalry. The advance guard was under the command of Allah Yardad Khan. The primary body was under his direct supervision. The rear guard was under the command of Bahadur Khan Muhammadzai. Shahanchibashi established Islamgarh as the center of his operations. His strategy involved commencing the campaign from Sialkot in the east, advancing against the Sikhs from Gujrat towards Jehlam, encircling them along the riverbanks, and compelling their surrender.

=== Dharamyudh against Shahanchibashi ===
Bedi Ram Singh hailed from the village of Kotli Faqir Chand Bedian, located in the Sialkot district. The news of Shahanchibashi's oppressive acts infuriated him and he was determined to launch Dharam yudh against the Afghan leader. Therefore, Bedi journeyed from village to village, mobilizing young men to enlist in the dharam yudh (holy war) against Shahanchibashi, accompanied by the resounding beat of drums. Among those who answered his call were Jodh Singh and Diwan Singh Bajwa of Kalaswalie, who arrived with approximately 250 men, along with the Wadalia sardars.

== Battle ==
Ram Singh led his forces as they moved on Sialkot, the location of Shahanchibashi's army. Shahanchibashi sent Ali Khan, Asadullah, Murid Khan, and Kamil Din to lead a strong army. Many young men, both Sikh and Hindu, started to join the Shahids.

=== First Day of the Battle ===
The battle on the first day occurred at Protian. The combatants advanced toward Torian, where another intense confrontation occurred. The battles were conducted over an area of approximately 10 square kilometres. In certain locations, the Afghans were gaining the advantage, while in others, the Sikhs were in a more dominant position. By evening, the situation remained a stalemate. At nightfall, both parties returned to their respective camps. They ignited fires, prepared meals, and administered care to the injured. The reserves maintained a watch. The fighters retired for the night.

=== Second Day ===
The Afghans relocated their camp to the Chenab River during the night. At dawn, both sides prepared once more for the battle. Ram Singh was at the forefront and several Sardars followed his lead. Trenches were excavated. A furious battle was fought throughout the entire day but at end both parties retreated and no one had emerged victorious.

=== Third Day ===
At a great distance from Gujrat, Shahanchibashi commanded the bulk of the Afghan army. From the western bank of the Chenab River, Ram Singh and his Sikh followers moved forward. From the west came Sikh sardars like Sahib Singh and Ranjit Singh. Seven kilometers east of Gujrat, there was a furious battle. Shahanchibashi and Ram Singh were both shot dead. The Durrani army fled away while being decimated. Nearly 3,000 Afghans and about half that number of the Sikhs were slain and wounded. A large booty consisting of camels, horses and war material fell into the hands of the Sikhs.

== Aftermath ==
Shahanchibashi's corpse received the worst disdain and disrespect. Attached on a spearhead and displayed in several cities and villages, the head was crowned with a towering Afghan hat. Ranjit Singh gathered noteworthy tribute from the Muslim leaders under his control when Shahanchibashi died.

The Sikhs expected Shah Zaman's invasion in the winter of 1797, knowing that he intended to repeat his earlier invasions. On Diwali, several Sikh leaders decided to get together in Amritsar to plan how to repel the invasion. They invited Sahib Singh, the Patiala ruler, to the meeting in Amritsar, but he being a loyal subject of the Afghan king, refused the invitation on the grounds that their plans for this season would be no more successful than those for the previous one.
