= Mian Ghaus Khan =

Military officer

Ghaus Khan
- Died: 1814
- Allegiance: Sukerchakia Misl; Sikh Empire
- Branch: Topkhana
- Service years: 1804–1814
- Rank: Artillery commander
- Conflicts: Battle of Attock (1813); Battle of Kashmir (1814)
- Children: Sultan Mahmud Khan

Mian Ghaus Khan (Note: Punjabi: میاں غوث خان) (died 1814), better known as Mian Ghausa, was a Punjabi Muslim who served as an artillery officer for Sardar Maha Singh of Sukerchakia Misl and later his son Ranjit Singh, founder of the Sikh Empire.

== Background ==
Ghaus Khan belonged to a Muslim Rajput family from Batala in Gurdaspur district. His family had been associated with gunnery for generations.

== Military career ==
Ghaus Khan started his career in the army of Maha Singh. His first significant participation was during the conquest of the Rohtas Fort from Nur-ud-Din Bamezai, a Durrani general. He accompanied Maha Singh during four-month siege to Rasool Nagar, in which they were assisted by Jai Singh Kanhaiya, chief of the Kanhaiya Misl.

Ghaus Khan served under the 10-year old Ranjit Singh during the siege of Sodhra. Sometime after, Maha Singh died and Ranjit Singh was crowned the chief of Sukerchakia Misl. In 1799, he accompanied Ranjit Singh and his mother-in-law, Sada Kaur in the conquest of Lahore from the Bhangi Misl. Ghaus Khan was a skilful artillery officer and known to be close to both Maha Singh and Ranjit Singh. In 1801, Ranjit Singh was proclaimed the Maharaja of Punjab. Ghaus Khan became artillery commander of Khalsa Army in 1804, and was rewarded with jagirs of Van and Bharoval in Amritsar district, along with a mansion in Lahore. In 1807, he commanded the operation with the six-year old Prince Kharak Singh, when he was sent to capture the fort of Sheikhupura. In 1812, when Ranjit Singh reorganized the artillery wing of his army into Topkhana Khas and Topkhana Mubarak, Ghaus Khan was placed in charge of both, with the designation of Darogha-i-Topkhana.

Ghaus Khan commanded the artillery during the battle of Attock in 1813, in which the Attock fort was captured. He died of Cholera during the Kashmir campaign in 1814. After his death, his son Sultan Mahmud Khan (d. 1859) too served as an artillery officer in the army of Ranjit Singh.
