= Battle of Amritsar (1797) =

Battle of the Afghan-Sikh wars

- Part of Afghan–Sikh Wars
Date	12, January 1797
Location	Amritsar, Punjab
Result	Sikh victory

Belligerents
Sikh Confederacy	Durrani Empire

Commanders and leaders
Ranjit Singh; Baghel Singh; Sahib Singh Bhangi; Tara Singh Ghaiba	Zaman Shah

Strength
15,000-50,000	Unknown

Casualties and losses
15,000 Sikhs killed or wounded	20,000 or 35,000 Afghans killed

The Battle of Amritsar (1797) was fought between Zaman Shah of the Durrani Empire and Ranjit Singh of the Sukerchakia Misl, allied with other Sikh Misls, during Zaman Shah’s third invasion of Punjab. The Sikhs emerged victorious, and Zaman Shah withdrew to Lahore.

== Background ==
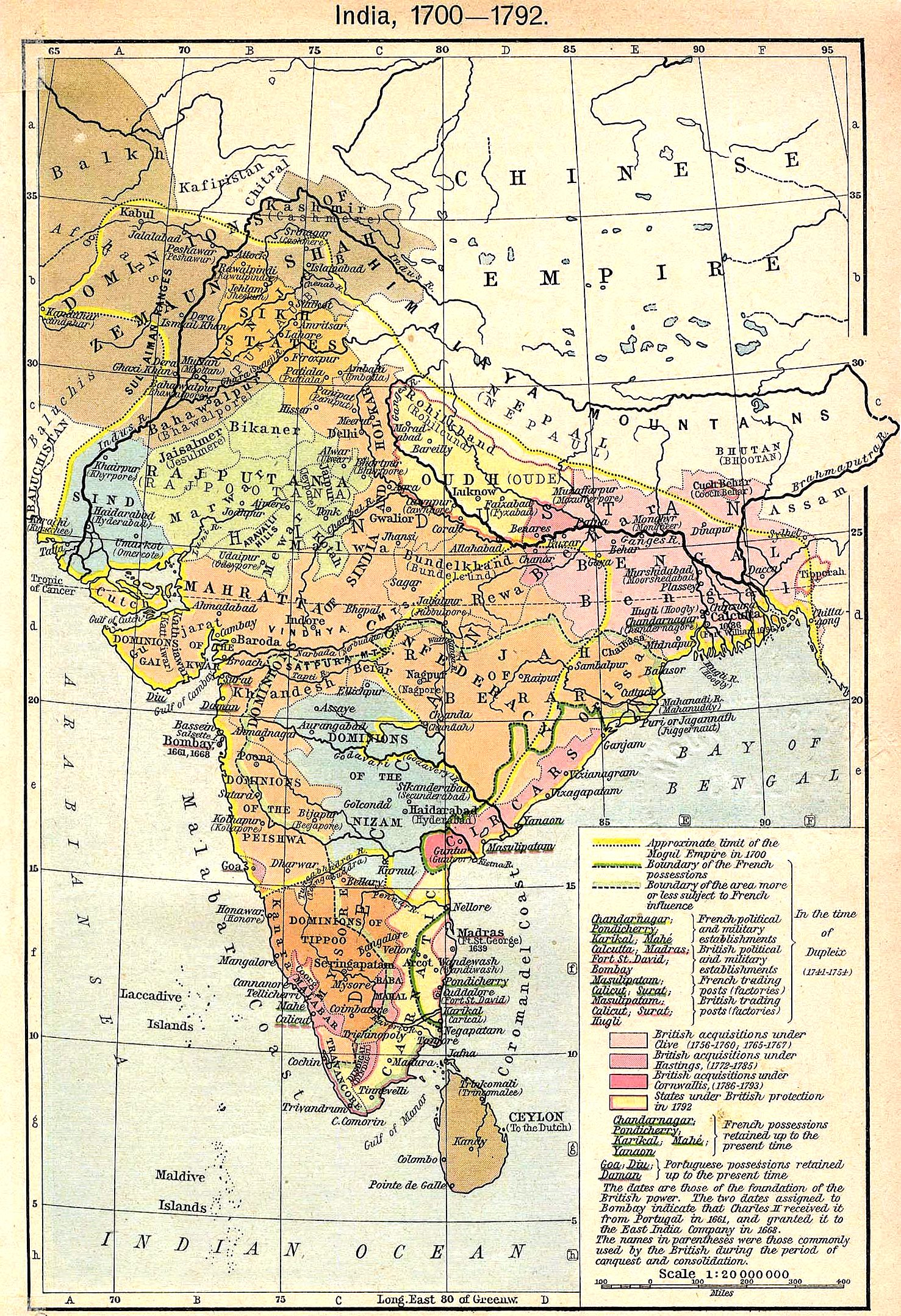
India in 1792

On 12 October 1796, Shah Zaman launched his third invasion of the Punjab with the aim to free the Mughal Emperor from Maratha supremacy and bringing Punjab under Durrani domination from the fragmented Sikhs who had been ruling it since 1765. The Marathas, even though the strongest force in India, were divided into various houses such as the Holkars, Scindias, and Gaekwads. This made them unable to fight against the invasion, while the Muslims of India hailed this invasion with big enthusiasm.

Zaman Shah arrived on the banks of the Indus on the 26th of November, 1796, and dispatched several horsemen for revenue collecting, and several chiefs of the Durranis were tasked with scouting the Sikh movements. After constructing the bridge to advance further into Punjab, the Durranis were opposed by Milkha Singh of Rawalpindi, who retreated after a brief skirmish. Ranjit Singh was present at the southern bank of the Jhelum River with 10,000 men. Hearing about the invasion of Zaman Shah, he sent his treasury and the female population to Patiala and started launching surprise raids on the Durrani Army.

In early January of 1797, Zaman Shah entered Lahore and was greeted positively by its Muslim population. The Durrani Shah, during his stay in Lahore, received submissions from the nearby Rajas and Zamindars of the Punjab.

== Battle ==
On the 11th of January 1797, a cavalry division of the Durrani Army raided Amritsar but was repulsed by the Sikhs. Zaman Shah felt insulted by this defeat and mobilized a major part of his army for an attack on Amritsar.

The fight began at 8:00 AM on January 12, 1797, close to Amritsar. Shah Zaman's Durrani army with its portable cannon mounted on camels, opened the engagement with a barrage of cannon fire. The Sikhs, armed mostly with matchlock weapons, fired regulated salvos but could not counter the range and firepower of the Durrani artillery. The fight raged for six hours, and by 2:00 PM neither army had the advantage. The Sikh commanders, seeing the engagement had reached a stalemate, called for a general charge, to employ their tactics of hand-to-hand combat. The contemporary accounts state that the Sikh warriors tyrnd to discard their turbans, let their hair down, clenched their beards in their mouths, and charged into the Durrani ranks with swords raised. This caused great disruption to the Durrani formations and a savage melee ensued for nearly four hours. By late afternoon, the Durrani army lost its nerve and began to retreat in disorder, which the Sikhs followed to the edge of Lahore.

== Aftermath ==
On the evening of 13 January 1797, Shah Zaman arrived in Lahore after his defeat at Amritsar. While Shah Zaman fortified the city, expanded capabilities in arms production and called upon regional allies to prepare to advance on Delhi, active Sikh opposition by Ranjit Singh and other chiefs prevented the Afghan Army from advancing. They harassed Afghan troops, disrupted lines of supply and confused established communications. The Afghan commanders were unreliable and the discipline of their army fell there was no plunder to get.

Before he could advance, he learnt of a rebellion in Herat, led by his brother Mahmud Shah Durrani, and had to abandon his campaign. He extracted heavy tribute from Lahore and had to start travelling west, by a forced march, on 30 January, leaving no authority for the Afghans half way to Delhi as he passed beyond the Jhelum, in the process giving back the initiative to the Sikhs in the region.
