= Chhajja Singh =

Sikh warrior

Sardar Chhajja Singh was a Jat Sikh warrior and leader of Jathâ succeeding Banda Singh Bahadur of the early 18th century Punjab region. He was also the founder of the Bhangi Misl He was the first companion of Banda Singh Bahadur to receive Sikh baptism of Amrit. According to Kanaihya Lal, he had taken Amrit at the hands of Guru Gobind Singh.

== Biography ==
Born in a Jat Sikh Dhillon family of Panjwar village, 13 kms from Amritsar near Tarn Taran in Majha region of Punjab, Chajja Singh had a family relation of Bhuma Singh. After the death of Banda Singh Bahadur, Chajja Singh and Jagat Singh administered Amrit to Bhuma Singh, Natha Singh and Jagat Singh and made them their companions. Accompanied by many others, he took forceful actions in harassing the despotic government officials. A little later Chajja Singh was joined by Mohan Singh and Gulab Singh of Dhoussa village (six miles north-east of Amritsar), Karora Singh of Choupal, Gurbaksh Singh a Sandhu Jat of Roranwala, Agar Singh Khangora and Sawan Singh Randhawa. They all took Amrit from Chajja Singh. After Chajja Singh's death Bhuma Singh became his successor and leader of the Bhangi misl.

== See also ==
- Sikh Confederacy
- Misl

| Preceded by Banda Singh Bahadur | Leader of Jathâ and Founder of the Bhangi Misl; 1716 – | Succeeded by Bhuma Singh Bhangi |
