= Dasaundha Singh =

- Chief of Nishanwalia Misl
- Coronation: 1748
- Successor: Sangat Singh (brother)
- Born: Dasaundha Singh Shergill; Mansur, Firozepur, Punjab
- Died: 1767; Meerut
- Father: Chowdhry Sahib Rai Shergill

Dasaundha Singh was the first chief of Nishanwalia Misl. Also, he became the jathedar of one of the 5 groups of Tarna Dal and received a Nishan Sahib and Nagara drum from Nawab Kapur Singh in 1734.

== Biography ==
He was born in Mansurwala village. He was the son of Chowdhry Sahib Rai Shergill. Along with his brother, Sangat Singh, he was initiated into the Sikh Panth in the 1730s at the time of Darbara Singh, the chief of the Sikh army (up to 1734).

He was proclaimed the leader of the Nishwalia misl in 1748 at the formation of the Dal Khalsa. Soon, he became a senior leader of the Taruna Dal. His Jatha used to lead the Sikh army bearing the Khalsa Nishan flags in the front of the army. He captured several areas for the Misl between 1764 and 1767, including between Singhanwala and Ambala. He was ultimately killed at Merrut, in a battle fought between his army and the joint army of Jahan Khan and Zabita Khan (later Dharam Singh) in May 1767. He was succeeded by his younger brother, Sangat Singh.
