= Singhpura, Lahore =

Neighbourhood in Lahore

Singhpura سنگھ پُورہ
- Neighbourhood
- Location in Pakistan
- Coordinates: 31°58′1″N 74°36′6″E
- Country: Pakistan
- Province: Punjab
- City: Lahore
- Tehsil: Shalimar

Singhpura is a neighbourhood in Shalimar Tehsil of Lahore in Punjab, Pakistan. It derives its name from the historic Singhpura Misl.
