= Tara Singh Ghaiba =

Sikh warrior (1710–1807)

Sardar Tara Singh Ghaiba
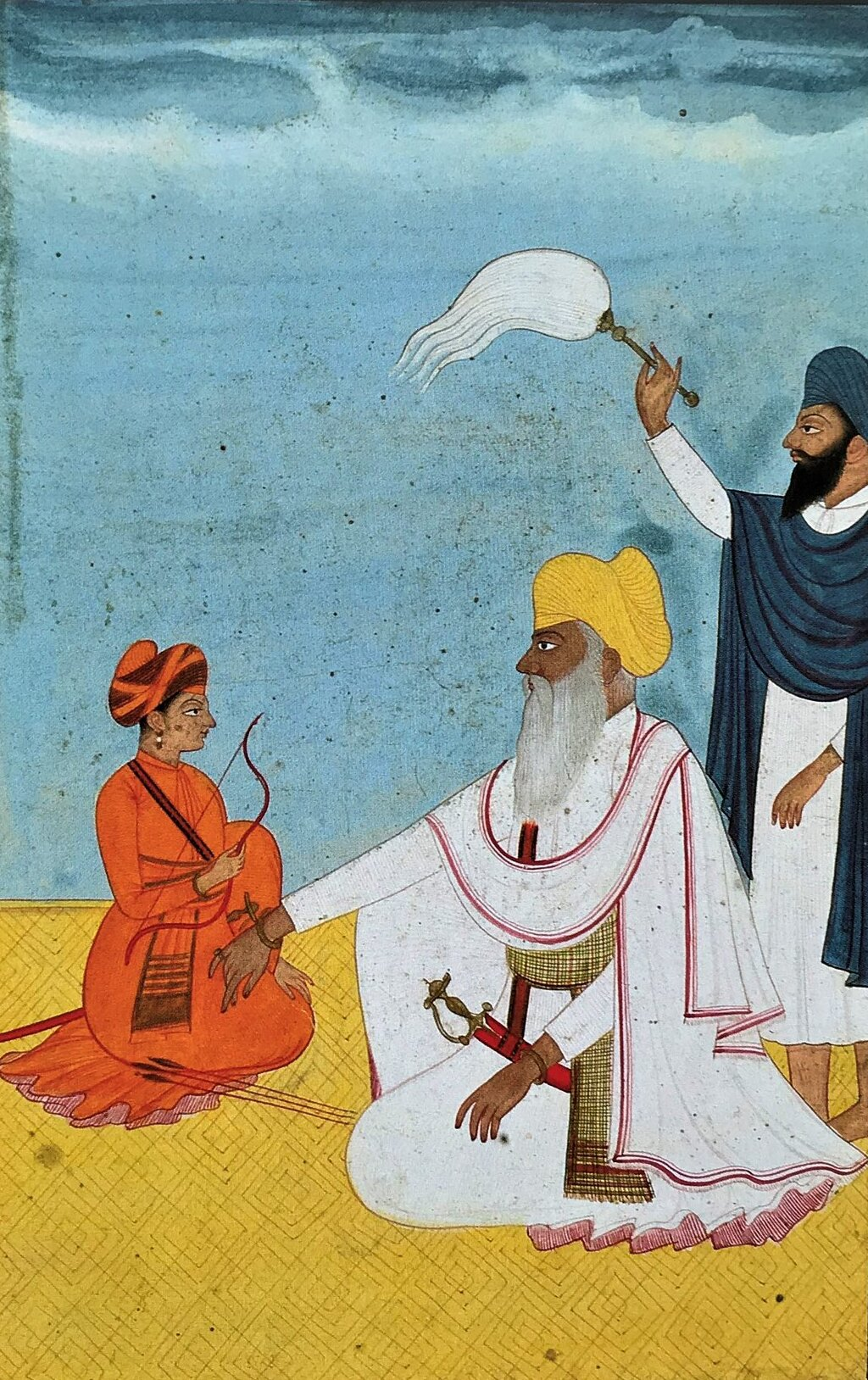
- Miniature painting of Tara Singh Ghaiba (middle, yellow turban) with flywhisk attendant to the right and young boy to the left, circa 18th century
- Born: 1710
- Died: 1807 (aged 96–97)
- Title: Chief of the Dallewalia Misl
- Predecessor: Sardar Gulab Singh

Tara Singh Ghaiba (1710–1807) was an associate member of the Dallewalia Misl, who became the Leader of the Misl after the death of their founding member and head Sardar Gulab Singh. He made Rahon the capital of his Misl.

== Early life ==
Sardar Tara Singh was supposedly born in 1710. He belonged to a Jat family of Kang Clan, from a village called Kang, present day six kilometers south of Lohian, in Tahsil Nakodar Punjab, India. They had about hundred goats. When he was a young goatherd, he mastered the skill to cross his flock through the Bein with ropes. And earned the name Ghaiba meaning he who could adopt mysterious devices. Once a notorious Gujjar robber Sulaiman, stolen his goats. The incident shook him, and In sheer desperation and despair, Tara left his village and started robbing. His reckless bravery added companions in his act. In March 1757, He earned his first horse by ditching Ahmad Shah Durrani's troops. When they made Tara captive and asked to help them cross the Bein, Tara fled to the jungle with their given horse. Gradually he joined Gulab Singh Dallevalia in his plundering raids.

== Leadership of Dallewalia Misl ==
The Dallewalia Misl was one of the twelve Sikh Misls (sovereign groups of the Sikh Confederacy). Gulab Singh Dallewal was the founder of the Dallewalia Misl, which was operated near Dera Baba Nanak on the left bank of the River Ravi, 50 km northeast of Amritsar. After Gulab Singh's and Gurdiyal Singh's death, Tara Singh Ghaiba assumed the leadership, and he further expanded this Misl up to Ambala Area (Haryana Region). With other Sikh Sardars he Sacked Kasur city of Pathans and Joined the Sikh Sardars in the sack of Sirhind City in 1764. His bravery and passion for war and conquest made the confederacy of Dallevalia very strong within a short time.

== Achievements ==
One of the first exploits in 1757, was to rob the troops of Ahmad Shah Durrani, an advance party under his son Timur Shah who was carrying the treasure from Delhi to Afghanistan. This treasure had crossed river, Tara Singh and Karora Singh decided to seize it before it crossed river Chenab. They reached the spot silently, cut down the guards present there, broke open the boxes, filled their leather bags with coins, and disappeared instantly and returned safely to Amritsar.

- In 1759 Tara Singh seized Rahon, He had control considerable territory on the both sides of Sutlej river.
- In 1760 he seized the parganahs of Dharamkot and Fatahgarh lying to the south of the Satlej, he gave Fatahgarh to his cousins Dharam Singh and Kur Singh of village Kang.
- He kept Dharamkot with himself.
- He captured Rahon and areas around; Rahon attained a high eminence because of commanding location. It was made the seat of his government.
- On his return to the Doab, he took the Sarai Dakkhni from Sharaf Ud'Din, an Afghan of Jalandhar and then marched eastwards, seizing the country around Rahori where he took up his residence.
- He next captured Nakodar from the Manj Rajputs, and other groups of villages on the right of the Sutlej, including Mahatpur and Kot Badal Khan.
- In March, 1763, Tara attended Hola festival.
- In March, 1783, he was with other Sikhs in Delhi. He brought two guns from the Red Fort and kept them at Rahon. He rendered great help to Baghel Singh in constructing seven gurdwaras at Delhi
- Tara Singh Ghaiba maintained cordial relations with Patiala. In 1765, he helped Araar Singh in suppressing the revolt of Prince Himmat Singh who claimed the crown for himself.

== Religious life ==
Tara Singh was an enthusiastic Sikh. He believed in converting people to the Sikh religion by love and affection. Tara gave liberal help to the needy new converts. He converted Chaudhri Gauhar Das of Kang village. His set examples, followed by both the villages, Kang Kalan and Kang Khurd.

== Distribution of territory ==
Tara Singh distributed his territory among all his four sons.

- Jhanda Singh was given Nakodar and Mahilpur.
- Dasaundha Singh given Dakhrii.
- Gujar Singh possessed parganahs of Ghungrana and Baddowal.
- The youngest whose name could not be traced was kept with him at Rahon.

== Death ==
In 1807, Tara Singh Ghaiba died in the attack of Naraingarh. Maharaja Ranjit Singh attacked and annexed all the Dallevalia territories including Rahon to his empire.

== Battles fought ==
- Capture of Rahon(1760)
- Capture of Sarai Dakkhni (1760)
- Capture of Nakhodar
- Sack of Kasur (1763)
- Battle of Sirhind (1764)
- Battle of Delhi (1783)
- Battle of Thanesar (1789)
- Battle of Amritsar (1797)
- Battle of Amritsar (1798)
- Battle of Nairaingarh (1807)

== See also ==
- Rahon
- Dallewalia Misl
- Sardar Gulab Singh Rathore
