= Sikh Confederacy =

Sikh military confederation (1748–1799)

Sikh Confederacy Sikh Misalā
- 1748–1799
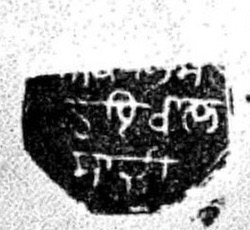
- Seal of the Khalsa (1759)
- Motto: ਅਕਾਲ ਸਹਾਇ; Akāl Sahāi "With God's Grace"
- Anthem: ਦੇਗ ਤੇਗ਼ ਫ਼ਤਹਿ Dēg Tēg Fateh "Victory to Charity and Arms"
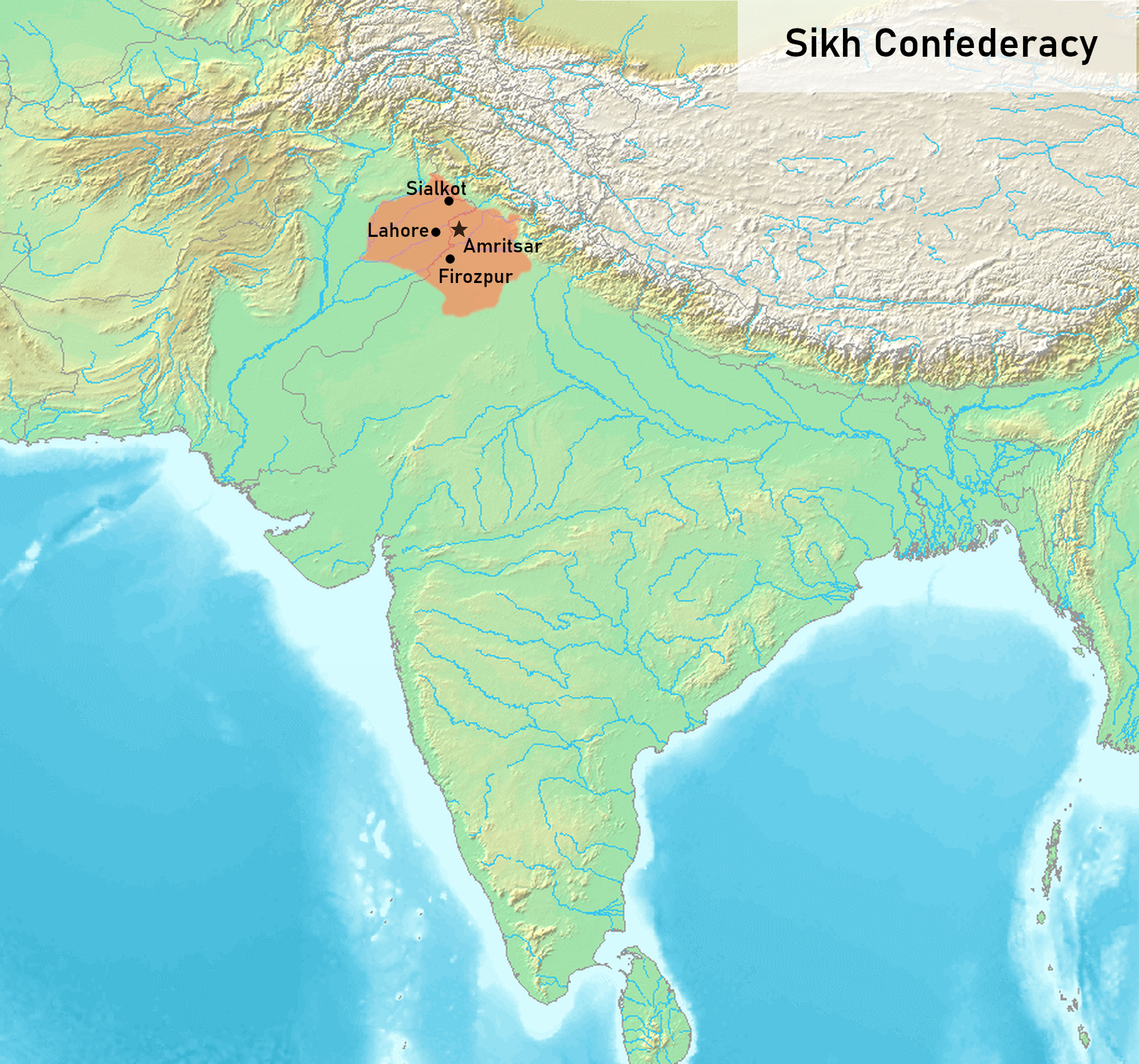
- Map of the Sikh Confederacy
- Status: Confederation
- Capital: Amritsar
- Language: Punjabi
- Religion: Sikhism (official); Islam; Hinduism
- Government: Aristocratic republic
- Jathedar
  - 1748–1753: Nawab Kapur Singh
  - 1753–1783: Jassa Singh Ahluwalia
  - 1783–1799: Naina Singh
- Legislature: Sarbat Khalsa
- History
  - Passing of Gurmata to establish the Sikh Confederacy: 29 March 1748
  - Ranjit Singh unites the Sikh Confederacy into the Sikh Empire: 7 July 1799
- Currency: Gobindshahi sikka (1761–1777); Nanakshahi sikka (1777–1799)
Preceded by	Succeeded by
Durrani Empire; Mughal Empire	Sikh Empire; Cis-Sutlej states
- Today part of: India; Pakistan

The Sikh Confederacy was a confederation of twelve sovereign Sikh states (each known as a Misl, derived from the Arabic word مِثْل meaning 'equal'; sometimes spelt as Misal) which rose during the 18th century in the Punjab region in the northwestern part of the Indian subcontinent. The misls were sovereign Sikh principalities originally formulated to defend the Darbar Sahib complex of Amritsar. It was governed decentrally, being described as decentralized unity that was flexible, with no single ruler being paramount or permanent and instead collective action being used that was based upon organisational discipline and shared legitimacy.

== History ==
=== Background ===
In order to withstand the persecution of Shah Jahan and other Mughal emperors, several of the later Sikh Gurus established military forces and fought the Mughal Empire and Pahari Hill rajas in the 17th century and early 18th century. Banda Singh Bahadur continued Sikh resistance to the Mughal Empire until his defeat at the Battle of Gurdas Nangal.

=== Formation of a Sikh confederation ===
Mughal emperor Farrukhsiyar, who persecuted the Sikhs in the 1710s

After the death of Banda Singh, the Sikhs were left without a main leader and entered in a period of hardship. The Sikhs (more precisely the Tat Khalsa faction) managed to gain control of Amritsar and established it as their centre after evicting the Bandai Sikhs from it. Bhai Mani Singh was appointed as the custodian of the Darbar Sahib shrine. Other opponents to the Sikhs at the time aside from the Mughals were heretical sects, such as the Gulab Rahis and Gangu Shahis, that continued to follow a lineage of personal gurus, which mainstream Sikhs had stopped practicing after the death of Guru Gobind Singh. Whilst the majority of Sikhs in this period continued to live a civilian life in Mughal society, a proporation of Sikhs continued a rebellion against the Mughal authority, with these Sikhs being known as the Tat Khalsa. According to W. H. McLeod, only Sikhs who kept an outwardly Khalsa Sikh identity, such as by keeping uncut hair, were persecuted by the Mughals while the majority of Sikh laymen went mostly unaffected by the Mughal persecutions. These rebel Sikhs took refuge in inaccessible and hidden away areas and conducted a low-level insurgency against the Mughal Empire, such as by plundering and killing government officials and their supporters. For several years, large gatherings of the Sikhs became a liability, thus the Sikhs remained mobile, and Sikhs found refuge in the forests, jungles (such as the Lakhi Jungle), swamps (such as Kahnuwan Chhamb), deserts (such as the Malwa desert around Bathinda), and the Himalayan foothills (namely the Jammu-Kangra hills) until they organized themselves into guerilla bands known as jathas.

After the death of Mughal emperor Farrukhsiyar in 1719, anti-Sikh persecution decreased in intensity and the Sikhs began congregating at Amritsar again periodically. The Sikhs at the time were split into two main factions, the Tatt Khalsa and the Bandai Khalsa. One of first the prominent Sikh military actions in the post-Banda Singh Bahadur period was of Tara Singh resisting and being killed by the Mughal forces dispatched by Zakaria Khan after he had chastened the faujdar of Patti. Ala Singh, establisher of Patiala, had been conquering territory since around 1730. Rather than fighting through pitched battles, the Sikhs instead employed a cavalry tactic known as Dhai-phat, a type of guerilla warfare.

Arjan Dass Malik, one of the first writers to analyze the 18th century Sikh military resistance using modern military theory, identified the movement as being based upon three fundamentals:

1. Moral legitimacy
2. Popular support networks
3. Adaptive organization

However, by the early part of the 1730s, the Mughal governor Zakaria Khan changed tactics and attempted to make peace with the Sikh rebels by offering them a robe-of-honour, nawabship, and jagir grant from the Mughal emperor to a selected leader of their choosing. The Sikhs decided to pick Nawab Kapur Singh to receive these gifts from the Mughals, with the jagir consisting of villages near Amritsar. During this short-period of official recognition of the Sikhs by the Mughals, there was a brief moment of peace between the two parties, which allowed the Sikhs to formulate their ranks into more concise categorizations. Nawab Kapur Singh decided to organize the large amount of Sikhs into deras (large units) that were led by various heads from Khatri, Jat, and Rangreta backgrounds, with the duties of the communal kitchens (langar), treasury, stores, arsenal, and granery being assigned to specific Sikhs based upon their seniority and merit.

The basis of the Dal Khalsa army was established in 1733–1735 during the period of Sikh nawabship under the Mughals, based upon the numerous pre-existing Jatha militia groups and had two main formations: the Taruna Dal ("youth brigade") and the Budha Dal ("elder brigade"). The Sarbat Khalsa had attempted several times to unite the various, scattered jathas of the Sikhs into more defined institutions or bodies to better-able to defend themselves from Mughal and Afghan attacks.

However, Nawab Kapur Singh's attempts to pacify the Sikhs under him during the period of nawabship did not quell the desires of some of the more rebellious, anti-Mughal Sikhs, with some of them resuming their guerilla war tactics against the Mughal government, consisting of plundering and killing. Therefore, Zakaria Khan took-back the jagir that had been granted upon the Sikhs and restarted his anti-Sikh policies from before with increased intensity. Thus, the Sikhs returned to their jatha lifestyle in the face of government oppression. However, Bhai Mani Singh still controlled Amritsar due to paying a stipulated amount to the Mughal administration, which permitted the Sikhs to gather there on Diwali as long as this remittance was paid. After Mani Singh failed to pay the stipulated amount, he was executed by the Mughals. In 1739, the Sikhs pillaged the army of Nader Shah of Persia who was invading India and this led the Persian leader to warn Zakaria Khan that his rule in Punjab was threatened by the Sikhs. By the 1740s, the anti-Sikh persecution by the Mughals was at its highest levels, with faujdars and zamindars carrying-out Sikh oppression, such as the deaths of Mehtab Singh, Sukha Singh, Taru Singh, and Bota Singh. Zakaria Khan was succeeded by Yahya Khan, who continued the anti-Sikh oppression. During Yahya Khan's tenure, a band of Sikhs under Jassa Singh Ahluwalia killed Jaspat Rai, the Mughal faujdar of Eminabad. Jaspat Rai's brother, Lakhpat Rai, who served as the diwan of Lahore, started massacring thousands of Sikhs in-response, which was a genocide known by the Sikhs as the Chotta Ghallughara.

By 1748, the Sikhs had expelled the Mughal faujdar of Amritsar and constructed a fortress known as Ram Rauni there. On the annual meeting of the Sarbat Khalsa in Amritsar in 1748 during either Diwali or Baisakhi, a Gurmata was passed where the Jathas were reorganized into a new grouping called misls, with eleven misls forming out of the various pre-existing Jathas and a unified army known as the Dal Khalsa Ji. (Note: According to Dilgeer, the decision to formalize the eleven misls happened on 29 March 1748.) However, some of these misls, or at least their names, were used prior to this event in 1748. Some argue that instead of there being eleven misls, there were actually twelve, with the inclusion of the Phulkia Misl. However, strictly speaking, the Phulkia Misl was not a misl in the true sense of the word, as it had been excluded from the Sarbat Khalsa decision of 1748 to create the confederacy. Ultimate command over the Misls was bestowed to Jassa Singh Ahluwalia.

Afghan invasions of the Mughal Empire in the mid-18th century allowed the Sikhs to consolidate power in the northwest of the subcontinent. Beyond raids, one of their first attempts at administration was the introduction of the Rakhi system, that promised offered protection in exchange for revenue.

=== Expansion of power ===
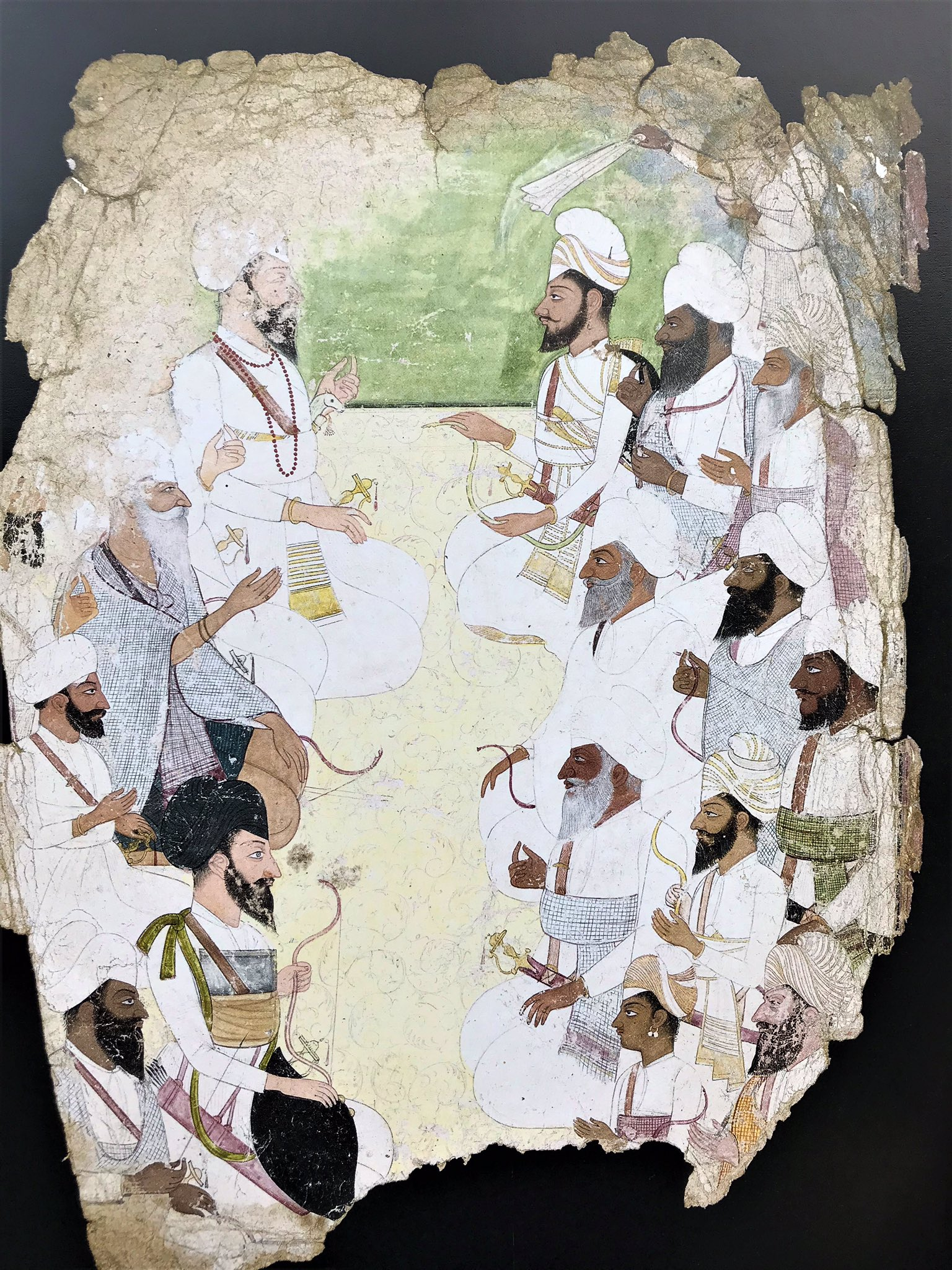
Sikh misls hold a diplomatic meeting, 18th century painting

By the early 1750s, the Sikhs had started taking-over territory in the Bari Doab, which was where the capital of the Mughal province was located. By 1750, Jai Singh Kanhaiya started issuing orders to local officials of the Bari Doab. Another Sikh leader, named Hakumat Singh, also started issuing orders in the period. Jassa Singh Ahluwalia conquered Fatehabad in 1753. In 1754, the Sikhs had started obstructing Mughal administrative operations in the Punjab, with them causing issues with the appointments of the faujdars of Eminadbad (Khwaja Mirza Khan) and Patti (Qasim Beg). During the Afghan invasions of India, the Sikhs nearly overpowered the Afghan official Jahan Khan near the end of 1757. The Afghan faujdar of Jalandhar, Sa'adat Khan Afridi, was expelled by the Sikhs in early 1758, with Lahore also being plundered. Ahmad Shah Abadali, who was busy contending with the Marathas (who had their own territorial ambitions in the Punjab), was unable to establish a firm control over the Punjab, as all the Afghan governors of the province were being defeated by the Sikhs, such as the Afghan governor of Lahore province in September 1761. Due to these factors, the Sikhs were able to establish their rule over the Punjab. However, the Durranis massacred around 5,000 Sikhs in an event known as the Vadda Ghallughara, but six months later the Afghans were defeated by the Sikhs at Amritsar and they retreated to Lahore. Eventually, Abdali went back to Kabul and the Afghan appointed faujdars of Bist Jalandhar Doab, Sirhind, Rechna Doab, and Chajj Doab, were removed from their positions by the Sikhs.

After the fall of Sirhind in 1764, the territory located south of the Sutlej river between Karnal and Ferozepore was jointly administered by the Shaheedan (and Nihangs), Bhangis, Ahluwalias, Dallewalias, Ramgarhias, and Karosinghias misls. Aside from the misls, there were also the Phulkian Sikhs, who had established the chiefdoms of Patiala, Nabha, Jind, Faridkot, Ambala, Shahabad, Thanesar, Kaithal, Jagadhri, and Buria. The misls were active in architectural projects, such as the construction of bungas at principal Sikh sites, like at Amritsar's parikrama.

Initially, the most powerful misls were the Ahluwalias, Ramgarhias, and Faizulpurias, but later the Bhangis became hegemonic, especially in the Majha region. According to J. S. Grewal, there were more than sixty Sikh-ruled principalities situated between the Yamuna and Indus rivers by the 1770s. By the 1770s, the leaders of the Sikh misls had started acting independently in their relations, with there being decreasing unity amongst the misls, with rivalries forming based on different alliances. Thus, internal divisions began, with infighting between the Ramgarhias, Ahluwalias, and Kanhaiyas. The Ahluwalias, Sukerchakias, Bhangis, Kanhaiyas, and Ramgarhias started asserting control over the states of the Punjab Hills region, becoming their suzerain. The Bhangis conquered Multan and held it until 1780. The Sikh chiefs located between the Sutlej and Yamuna rivers established the Rakhi tax during their incursions past the Yamuna river rather than seeking territorial acquisitions.

=== Decline ===
The flexible nature of the confederacy's governance allowed for powerful, local chiefs, such as the young Ranjit Singh of the Sukerchakias, to emerged. Most of the Sikh principalities established in the 18th century survived until the 19th century, when they were either absorbed or subjugated by the Sukerchakias. The Sukerchakias under Ranjit Singh would finally gain pre-eminence amongst all of its contemporary misls, leading to all of their annexations by the Sukerchakias and the eventual formation of a Sikh Empire in 1799. Ranjit Singh of the Sukerchakia Misl managed to subdue most of the other misls by the end of the 18th century. However, the Phulkian Sikhs and their kingdoms escaped this fate and continued to be independent from the Sukerchakias. In the 19th century, the former misls had lost their political and martial functions, yet their names became caste-markers for certain communities, such as the Thokas adopting the Ramgarhia name and the Kalals adopting the name Ahluwalia.

== Military ==
Each Misl was made up of members of soldiers, whose loyalty was given to the Misl's leader. A Misl could be composed of a few hundred to tens of thousands of soldiers. Any soldier was free to join whichever Misl he wished, and was free to cancel his membership of the Misl to whom he belonged. He could, if he wanted, cancel his membership of his old Misl and join another. The Barons would allow their armies to combine or coordinate their defences together against a hostile force if ordered by the Misldar Supreme Commander. These orders were only issued in military matters affecting the whole Sikh community. These orders would normally be related to defense against external threats, such as Afghan military attacks. The profits of a fighting action were divided by the misls to individuals based on the service rendered after the conflict using the sardari system.

The Sikh Confederacy is a description of the political structure, of how all the barons' chiefdoms interacted with each other politically together in Punjab. Although misls varied in strength, the use of primarily light cavalry with a smaller amount heavy cavalry was uniform throughout all of the Sikh misls. Cavalrymen in a misl were required to supply their own horses and equipment. A standard cavalryman was armed with a spear, matchlock, and scimitar. How the armies of the Sikh misls received payment varied with the leadership of each misl. The most prevalent system of payment was the 'Fasalandari' system; soldiers would receive payment every six months at the end of a harvest.

=== Cavalry tactics ===
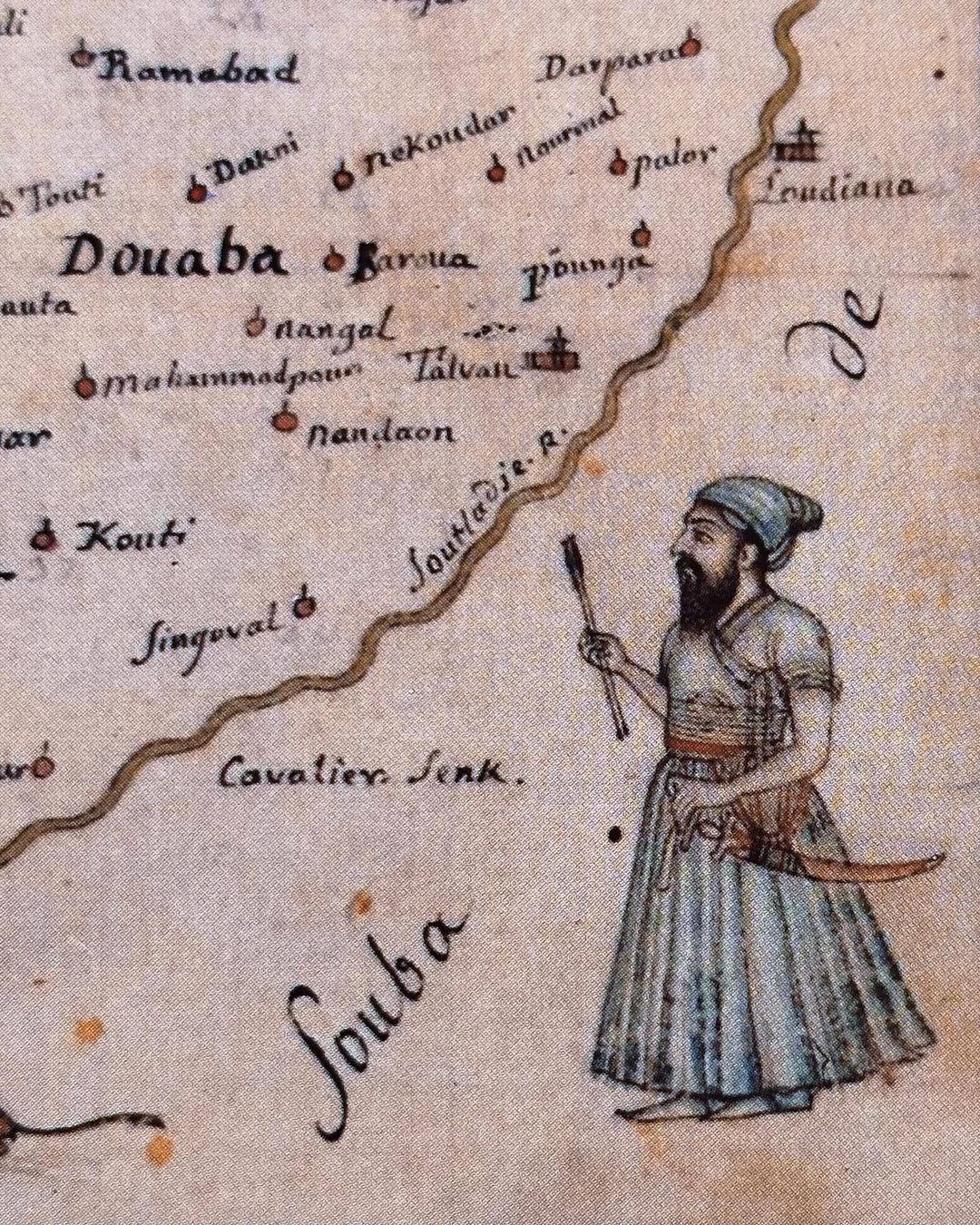
The Misls primarily employed cavalry in warfare. Detail of a depiction of a Misl-era Sikh cavalry warrior from a map of the Lahore Subah commissioned by Jean Baptiste Joseph Gentil, ca.1770

Fauja Singh considers the Sikh misls to be guerrilla armies, although he notes that the Sikh misls generally had greater numbers and a larger number of artillery pieces than a guerrilla army would. The misls were primarily cavalry based armies and employed less artillery than Mughal or Maratha armies. The misls adapted their tactics to their strength in cavalry and weakness in artillery and avoided pitched battles. Misls organized their armies around bodies of horsemen and their units fought battles in a series of skirmishes, a tactic which gave them an advantage over fighting pitched battles. Bodies of cavalry would attack a position, retreat, reload their muskets, and return to attack it again. The tactics used by misl field armies include flanking an enemy, obstructing river passages, cutting off a unit from its supplies, intercepting messengers, attacking isolated units like foraging parties, employing hit-and-run tactics, overrunning camps, and attacking baggage trains. To fight large armies the misl would completely evacuate the areas in front of the enemy's marching route but follow in the rear of the opposition and reconquer areas the enemy had just captured, threaten agents of the enemy with retribution, and sweep over the countryside in the wake of the enemy's withdrawal.

The Running Skirmish was a tactic unique to the Sikh cavalrymen which was notable for its effectiveness and the high degree of skill required to execute it. George Thomas and George Forster, contemporary writers who witnessed it described its use separately in their accounts of the military of the Sikhs. George Forster noted:

"A party from forty to fifty, advance in a quick pace to a distance of carbine shot from the enemy and then, that the fire may be given with the greatest certainty, the horses are drawn up and their pieces discharged, when speedily, retiring about a 100 paces, they load and repeat the same mode of annoying the enemy. Their horses have been so expertly trained to a performance of this operation that on receiving a stroke of hand, they stop from a full canter."

=== Total military strength ===
In 1746, H. T. Prinsep estimated the total strength of the Sikh Confederacy's military (Dal Khalsa Ji) to be 69,500 horsemen (incl. the Phulkians). Other contemporary estimates are Browne's estimate of 73,000 cavalry and 25,000 infantry or George Thomas' estimate of 60,000 cavalry and 5,000 infantry.

== Administration ==
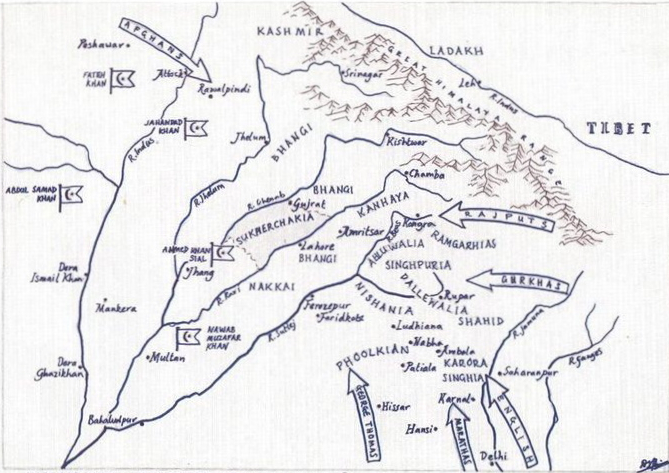
Sikh Confederacy (1748–1799) Phulkian Misl · Ahluwalia Misl · Bhangi Misl · Kanheya Misl · Ramgarhia Misl · Singhpuria Misl · Panjgarhia Misl · Nishanwalia Misl · Sukerchakia Misl · Dallewalia Misl · Nakai Misl · Shaheedan Misl

The misls formed a commonwealth that was described by Swiss adventurer Antoine Polier as a natural "aristocratic republic". Each misl was a confederacy of Sikh horsemen that was headed by a leader known as a sardar, who held the position of misldar. Although the misls were unequal in strength, and each misl attempted to expand its territory and access to resources at the expense of others, they acted in unison in relation to other states. The misls held biannual meetings of their legislature, the Sarbat Khalsa in Amritsar. According to Hans Herrli, the various misls were not organized along the same lines as one another. Some were akin to large, family clans whilst others resembled brotherhoods (Nishanwalia Misl), or religious-orders (Shaheedan Misl). The size, prominence, and strength of each misl also varied considerably based on any particular point of time. By the last quarter of the 18th century, the individual misl leaders had begun acting independently in their relations.

The remainder was separated into Puttees or parcels for each Surkunda, and these were again subdivided and parcelled out to inferior leaders, according to the number of horse they brought into the field. Each took his portion as a co-sharer, and held it in absolute independence.

— Origin of the Sikh power in the Punjab (1834) p. 33 – Henry Thoby Prinsep

The Sikh Misls had four different classes of administrative divisions. The patadari, misaldari, tabadari, and jagirdari were the different systems of land tenure used by the misls, and land granted by the misl left the responsibility of establishing law and order to the owner of the land. The land under the direct administration of the chief of the misl was known as the sardari and the tabadari and jagirdari systems used land directly given by the chief from the sardari. The patadari and misaldari systems formed the basis of a misl, while tabadari and jagirdari lands would only be created after large acquisitions of land. The type of system that was used in an area depended on the importance of the chief sardar of the area to the rest of the misl.

=== Leadership ===
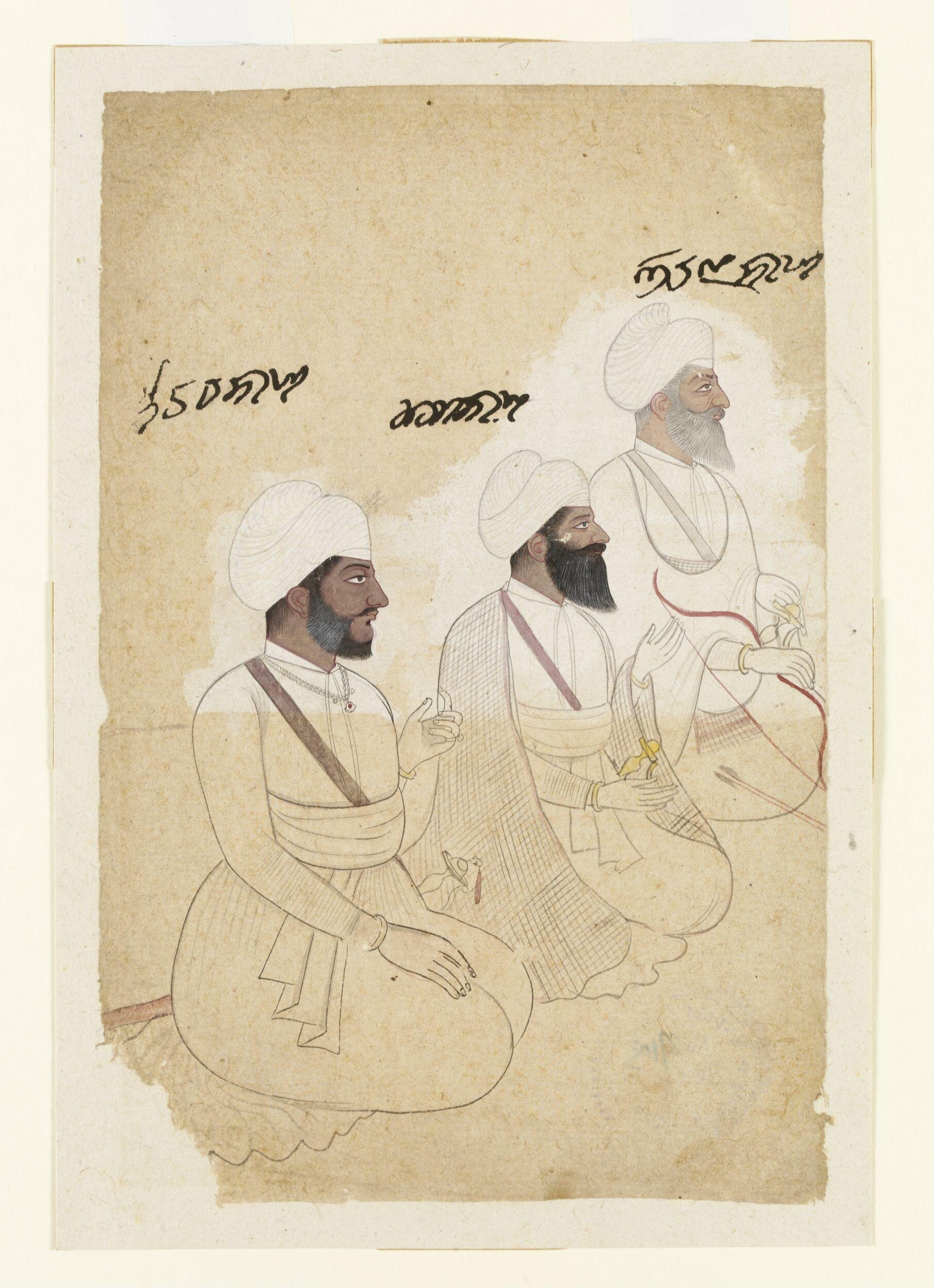
Painting of three seated Sikh sardars (from left-to-right): Nahar Singh, Karam Singh Sidhu of the Shaheedan Misl, and Lehna Singh Kahlon of the Bhangi Misl, circa late 18th century

Jassa Singh Ahluwalia was initially appointed as the head of the misls in 1748. However, there were a host of different leaders, from more notable ones to petty ones of lesser-importance. Some of the most important leaders of the Sikh Confederacy in Lahore province were: Jassa Singh Ahluwalia, Charat Singh Sukerchakia, Hari Singh Bhangi (and his two sons, Jhanda Singh and Ganda Singh), Jai Singh Kanhaiya, Gujjar Singh, and Jassa Singh Ramgarhia. Leaders with a medium-level of importance were Buddh Singh in the Jalandhar Doab, Hakikat Singh in the Bari Doab, Sahib Singh Sialkotia in the Rechna Doab, and Milkha Singh Thehpuria in the Sindh Sagar Doab. As for smaller leaders, they were numerous. In Delhi province, the leaders were amongst the Phulkian states.

=== Patadari system ===
The Patadari system affected newly annexed territories and was the original method used by the misls in administering land. The patadari system relied on the cooperation of surkundas, the rank of a leader of a small party of cavalrymen. The chief of the misl would take his/her portion and divide the other parcels among his Sardars proportional to the number of cavalrymen they had contributed to the misl. The Sardars would then divide their parcels among their Surkundas, and then the Surkundas subdivided the land they received among their individual cavalrymen. The Surkundas receiving parcels of land with settlements were required to fortify them (Note: The owners of larger villages were required to erect stockades and ditches while the owners of towns erected either keeps or forts.) and establish fines and laws for their zamindars and ryots. Parcels of land in the patadari system could not be sold, but could be given to relatives in an inheritance. The soldiers who received parcels from the Patadari system held their land in complete freedom.

=== Misaldari system ===
The Misaldari system applied to sardars with a small number of cavalrymen as well as independent bodies of cavalrymen who voluntarily attached themselves to a misl. They kept the lands they held before joining the misl as an allotment for their cooperation with the misl. The leaders of these groups, called misaldars, could transfer their allegiance and land to another misl without punishment.

=== Tabadari system ===
The Tabadari system referred to land under the control of a misl's tabadars. Tabadars served a similar function to retainers in Europe. They were required to serve as cavalrymen to the misl and were subservient to the misl's leader. Although tabadars received their land as a reward, their ownership was subject entirely on the misl's leader. The tabadari grants were only hereditary on the choice of the chief of the misl.

=== Jagirdari system ===
The Jagirdari system used the grant of jagirs by the chief of the misl. Jagirs were given by the chief of the misl to relations, dependents, and people who "deserved well". The owners of jagirs were subservient to the chief of the misl as their ownership was subject to his/her needs. Like the Tabadars, jagirdars were subject to personal service when the chief of the misl requested. However, because jagirs entailed more land and profit, they were required to use the money generated by their jagirs to equip and mount a quota of cavalrymen depending on the size of their jagir. Jagirdari grants were hereditary in practice but a misl's chief could revoke the rights of the heir. Upon the death of the owner of a tabadari or jagadari grant, the land would revert to direct control of the chief (sardari).

=== Rakhi system ===
The Rakhi system was the payment-for-protection tributary protectorate scheme practiced by the Dal Khalsa of the Sikh Confederacy in the 18th century. It was a large source of income to the Sikh Misls.

== Territory ==
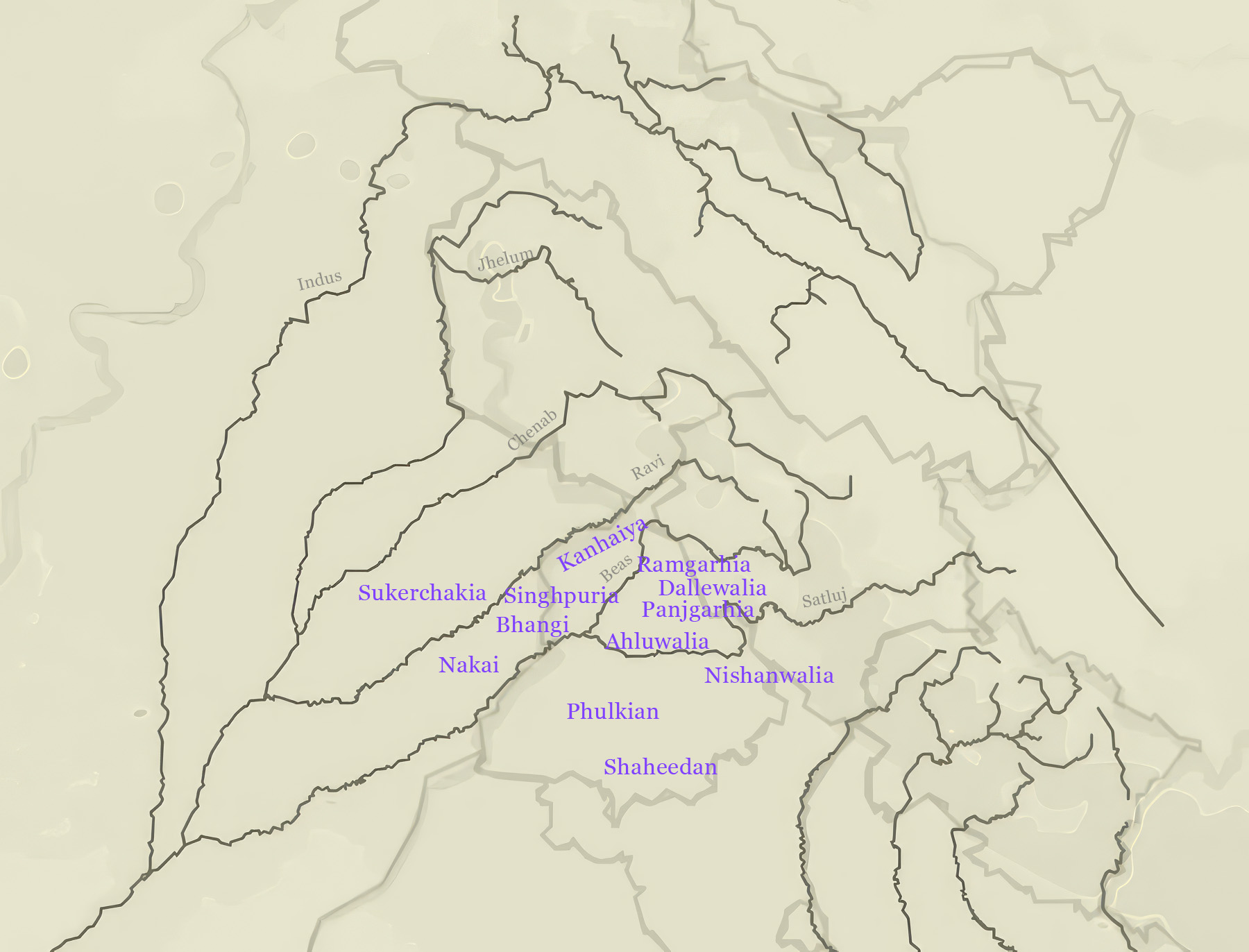
A Map showing different Misls of Sikh Confederacy

The two main divisions in territory between the misls were between those who were in the Malwa region and those who were in the Majha region. While eleven of the misls were north of the Sutlej river, one, the Phulkian Misl was south of the Sutlej. The Sikhs north of the Sutlej river were known as the Majha Sikhs while the Sikhs that lived south of the Sutlej river were known as the Malwa Sikhs. In the smaller territories were the Dhanigeb Singhs in the Sind Sagar Doab, the Gujrat Singhs in the Jech Doab, the Dharpi Singhs in the Rechna Doab, and the Doaba Singhs in the Jalandhar Doab.

=== Territories of specific misls ===
The various constituent misls did not have clearly defined territories from one another yet some areas had higher concentrations of Sikhs allying themselves with a particular misl. The particular tract of territory that each misl dominated are as follows:

- Bhangi Misl: most of western Punjab between Multan and the Hill States, including the settlements of Lahore, Amritsar, Gujrat, and Sialkot. The Bhangis held the Upper Rechna Doab, Upper Chajj Doab, and territory around Lahore and Amritsar.
- Sukerchakia Misl: south of the Bhangis, dominating the tract of land between the Chenab and Ravi rivers, including the settlements of Gujranwala and Wazirabad. The Sukerchakias held territory in the Rechna Doab.
- Nakai Misl: along the Ravi river, between Multan and Kasur, including the settlements of Sharqpur, Chuniau, Gugera, Dipalpur, Satgarha, and Kot Kamalia. The Nakais held territory in northern Multan and the Lower Bari Doab.
- Kanhaiya Misl: between Amritsar and the Punjab Hills, with Taragarh, Mirthal, Fathepur, and a small territory near Mukerian with Sohian and Hajipur. The Kanhaiyas held territory in the Upper Bari Doab.
- Dallewalia Misl: regions on the right-bank of the upper Sutlej river. The Dallewalias held territory in parts of Jalandhar and northern Malwa.
- Ahluwalia Misl: areas on the left-bank of the Sutlej river. The Ahluwalias held territory in the Bist-Jalandhar and accepted tribute from chiefs of Malwa, the Punjab Hills, the Gangetic Plains, Rajasthan, and the Upper Bari Doab.
- Ramgarhia Misl: towards the hills between the Ahluwalia and Dallewalia. The Ramgarhias held territory in the Upper Jalandhar Doab and parts of Malwa.
- Karorsinghia Misl: small territories held eastward from the Sutlej river and also Chhachhrauli (which later formed into Kalsia State). The Karorsinghias held territory in southeastern Malwa and the Upper Gangetic Doab.
- Faizulpuria Misl: along the right-bank of the Beas river and on both banks of the Sutlej, controlling settlements such as Ludhiana, Jalandar, Nurpur, and northwestern Ambala. They Faizulpurias held territory in the Jalandhar Doab and accepted tributes from the Delhi region.
- Nishanwalia Misl: Shahabad, ArnIo, and most of Ambala The Nishanwalias held territory in northern Malwa.
- Shaheedan Misl (and Nihangs): jointly controlled parts of the Punjab Plains southward of the Sutlej river, between Karnal and Ferozepore, alongside other misls. The Shaheedans held territory in eastern Malwa.
- Phulkian Misl: controlled territory between Sirhind and Delhi, forming the Sikh kingdoms of Patiala, Nabha, Jind, and Kaithal. The Phulkians held territory in southern Malwa.

== List of sovereign states under the Sikh Confederacy ==
List of Misls
Name	Founder	Founding clan(s)	Capital(s)	Other notable leaders	Strength in Regular Horseman (1746)	Strength in Regular Horseman (1780)	Misl Period Territory by 1759	Corresponding Current Area	Fate
Phulkian (ਫੂਲਕੀਆਂ Phūlkī'āṅ)	Phul Singh	Sidhu (Jat)	Patiala; Nabha; Jind; Faridkot	Ala Singh; Amar Singh	5,000	5,000	Patiala, Nabha, Jind, Kaithal, Barnala, Bathinda, Sangrur		Allied with the British and later became the princely states of Faridkot, Jind, Nabha, Malaudh and Patiala
Ahluwalia (ਆਹਲੂਵਾਲੀਆ Āhlūwālī'ā)	Sadho Singh	Ahluwalia (Kalal) (Note: The Kalal founders of the Ahluwalia Misl claimed descent from Jats.)	Kapurthala	Jassa Singh	3,000	10,000	Jalandhar district, Kapurthala district, Kana Dhillon, Nurmahal, Talwandi, Phagwara.		Raja Fateh Singh would be allied with the Sikh Empire under Maharaja Ranjit Singh and later became the princely state of Kapurthala after the second Anglo-Sikh war
Bhangi (ਭੰਗੀ Bhangī)	Chhajja Singh	Dhillon (Jat)	Amritsar	Bhuma Singh; Hari Singh; Jhanda Singh; Ganda Singh	10,000	30,000	Tarn Taran, Lahore	Tarn Taran district, Lahore	Conquered by the Sukerchakia Misl which immediately formed the Sikh Empire
Kanhaiya (ਕਨ੍ਹੱਈਆ Kanha'ī'ā)	Jai Singh	Sandhu (Jat)	Sohian	Sada Kaur	8,000	8,000	Ajnala, Gurdaspur, Dera Baba Nanak, Kalanaur, Pathankot, Sujanpur, Mukerian,	Gurdaspur district, Pathankot district, Hoshiarpur district	Annexed by the Sikh Empire
Ramgarhia (ਰਾਮਗੜ੍ਹੀਆ Rāmgaṛhī'ā)	Jassa Singh	Ramgharia (Tarkhan) and Jats	Sri Hargobindpur	Jodh Singh; Tara Singh; Mangal Singh	3,000	5,000	Batala, Urmar Tanda, Dasuya, Ghoman	Hoshiarpur district, Gurdaspur district, Jalandhar district, north of Amritsar	Annexed by the Sikh Empire
Singhpuria (ਸਿੰਘਪੁਰੀਆ Singhpurī'ā)	Khushal Singh; Budh Singh	Virk (Jat)	Jalandhar	Khushal Singh; Budh Singh	2,500	5,000	Singhpura, Amritsar, Sheikhupura, Jalandhar, Manauli, Bharatgarh, etc.	Amritsar district, Sheikhupura District, Pakistan	Areas above the Sutlej river annexed by the Sikh Empire, areas below the river annexed by the British
Panjgarhia (ਪੰਜਗੜੀਆ Panjgaṛī'ā) (Note: The Panjgarhia misl was further divided into the Sham Singh and Kalsias. The Kalsias were subdivided into the Landpindian and Barapindian.)	Karora Singh	Virk, Dhaliwal, and Sandhu (Jat)	Shamchaurasi; Hariana; Chhachhrauli (Kalsia)	Baghel Singh; Gur Bakhsh Singh Jodh Singh	12,000	10,000	Buria; Hoshiarpur; Hariana	Yamunanagar district, Hoshiarpur district	Annexed the British and later became the princely state of Kalsia, all territories above the Sutlej river annexed by the Sikh Empire
Nishanwalia (ਨਿਸ਼ਾਨਵਾਲੀਆ Nishānwālī'ā)	Dasaundha Singh	Gill, Shergill (Jat) other sources claim Khatri & Rangretas	Ambala Shahbad Markanda	Sangat Singh; Sukha Singh; Mehar Singh	12,000	2,000	Shahbad Markanda, Ambala, Ropar, Sri Anandpur Sahib	Ambala district, Ropar district, Present Chandigarh Area, Yamuna Nagar district, Shahbad Markanda and Kurukshetra	Annexed by the British Raj and Sikh Empire for territories above the Sutlej river
Sukerchakia (ਸ਼ੁੱਕਰਚੱਕੀਆ Shukarchakī'ā)	Naudh Singh	Sandhawalia, Hayer (Jat)	Gujranwala	Maha Singh; Ranjit Singh	2,500	75,000	Mughal Chak, Qila Didar Singh, Qila Mihan Singh, Ladhe Wala Waraich, Ferozewala, Butala Sham Singh, Marali Wala, Eminabad, Kalaske.		Formed the Sikh Empire
Dallewalia (ਡੱਲੇਵਾਲੀਆ Ḍalēvālī'ā)	Gulab Singh	Khatri, Kang & Badesha (Jat)	Rahon	Tara Singh Ghaiba	7,500	5,000	Rahon, Nawashahr, Garshankar, Mahilpur, Banga, Phillaur, Nakodar, Shahkot, Dharamkot, Ropar-Sialba, Khanna, etc.	Ludhiana district, Jalandhar district	Annexed by the Sikh Empire
Nakai (ਨਕਈ Naka'ī)	Heera Singh	Sandhu, Hundal (Jat)	Chunian	Ran Singh; Karmo Kaur; Kahan Singh	2,000	7,000	Baherwal, Khem Karan, Khudian, Gogera, Depalpur, Okara, Pakistan etc.	Okara district, Pakistan	Annexed by the Sikh Empire
Shaheedan (ਸ਼ਹੀਦਾਂ Shahīdāṅ)	Baba Deep Singh	Sandhu and Benipal (Jat)	Shahzadpur	Karam Singh; Sadhu Singh; Phula Singh	2,000	5,000	Talwandi Sabo, Shahzadpur.	Bathinda district, Panchkula district	Annexed by the Sikh Empire

== List of the predecessory jathas of the Sikh Confederacy ==
List of the contemporary sixty-five jathas of the Sikhs at the time of the founding of the Sikh Confederacy, circa mid-18th century
No.	Leader	Affiliation	Associated habitation	Notes
1.	Nawab Kapur Singh Faizullapuria			
2.	Jassa Singh Ahluwalia		Kalal village	
3.	Hari Singh Dhillon	Bhangi	Panjwar village	
4.	Jhanda Singh	Bhangi		
5.	Ganda Singh	Bhangi	Panjwar village	
6.	Natha Singh	Bhangi		
7.	Gujjar Singh	Bhangi		
8.	Garja Singh			
9.	Nibahu Singh	Bhangi		Nibahu Singh was the brother of Gujjar Singh Bhangi.
10.	Lehna Singh Khallon	Bhangi		
11.	Mehtab Singh		Khakh village, Amritsar district	
12.	Charat Singh Kanahiya	Kanhaiya		
13.	Diwan Singh			
14.	Phula Singh		Panawala village	
15.	Sanwal Singh Randhawa	Bhangi	Wagha village	
16.	Gurbakhsh Singh	Bhangi	Doda village	This jatha later joined the Bhangis.
17.	Dharam Singh	Bhangi	Klalwala village	
18.	Tara Singh	Bhangi	Chainpuria village	
19.	Bagh Singh		Kot Syed Muhammad village	
20.	Haqiqat Singh Kanahiya	Kanhaiya		
21.	Mehtab Singh	Bhangi	Wadala Sandhuan village	
22.	Jai Singh		Kahna village	
23.	Jandu Singh		Kahna village	
24.	Tara Singh		Kahna village	
25.	Sobha Singh		Kahna village	
26.	Bhim Singh		Kahna village	
27.	Amar Singh		Wagha village	
28.	Sobha Singh		Bhika village	
29.	Baghel Singh		Jhabal village	
30.	Gulab Singh		Dallewal village	
31.	Hari Singh		Dallewal village	
32.	Naudh Singh	Sukerchakia		Led by the great-grandfather of Maharaja Ranjit Singh.
33.	Gulab Singh		Majitha village	
34.	Mehtab Singh		Julka village	
35.	Karora Singh		Pangarh village	
36.	Hara Singh			
37.	Lajja Singh			
38.	Nand Singh		Sanghna village	
39.	Kapur Singh	Bhangi	Surianwala village	
40.	Amar Singh	Bhangi	Kingra village	Later joined the Bhangis.
41.	Jiwan Singh	Bhangi	Qila Jiwan Singh village	
42.	Sahib Singh	Bhangi	Sialkot	Later joined the Bhangis.
43.	Baba Deep Singh			Leader martyred.
44.	Natha Singh			Leader martyred.
45.	Madan Singh			
46.	Mohan Singh		Ranian village	
47.	Bagh Singh Hallowal	Bhangi		
48.	Jhanda Singh		Sultan Vind village (near Amritsar)	
49.	Mirja Singh Tarkhan			
50.	Sham Singh Mann		Bulqichak village	
51.	Mala Singh			
52.	Bahal Singh		Shekupura village	
53.	Amar Singh			
54.	Hira Singh			
55.	Ganga Singh			
56.	Lal Singh			
57.	Tara Singh Mann		Mannawala village, Amritsar district	Later joined the Bhangis.
58.	Mehtab Singh		Lalpur village, Tarn Taran district	
59.	Roop Singh			
60.	Anoop Singh Nakai	Nakai		
61.	Dasaunda Singh	Nishanwalia		
62.	Tara Singh Gheba		Dallewal	
63.	Dharam Singh Khatri		Amritsar	
64.	Sukha Singh		Mari Kamboke village	
65.	Jassa Singh Ramgarhia			

== List of battles fought by the Sikh Confederacy ==
Conflict (Period)	Belligerents	Opponents	Outcome
Siege of Amritsar (1748)	Sikh Confederacy	Mughal Empire	Sikh victory
Siege of Ram Rauni (1748–1749)	Sikh Confederacy	Mughal Empire	Sikh victory
Battle of Multan (1749)	Kaura Mal; Sikh Confederacy	Shah Nawaz Khan	Kaura Mal and Sikh victory
Battle of Nadaun (1752)	Sikh Confederacy	Mughal Empire	Sikh victory
Battle of Anandpur (1753)	Sikh Confederacy	Mughal Empire	Sikh victory
Battle of Amritsar (1757)	Sikh Confederacy	Durrani Empire	Durrani victory
Battle of Mahilpur (1757)	Sikh Confederacy; Adina Beg Khan	Durrani Empire	Sikh victory
Siege of Sirhind (1758)	Sikh Confederacy; Adina Beg Khan; Maratha Empire	Durrani Empire	Alliance victory
Siege of Lahore (1761)	Sikh Confederacy	Durrani Empire	Sikh victory
Battle of Sialkot (1761)	Sikh Confederacy	Durrani Empire	Sikh victory
Battle of Gujranwala (1761)	Sikh Confederacy	Durrani Empire	Sikh victory
Battle of Kup (1762)	Sikh Confederacy	Durrani Empire	Durrani victory
Battle of Harnaulgarh (1762)	Sikh Confederacy	Durrani Empire	Sikh victory
Battle of Sialkot (1763)	Sikh Confederacy	Durrani Empire	Sikh victory
Battle of Kasur (1763)	Sikh Confederacy	Durrani Empire	Sikh victory
Battle of Malerkotla (1763)	Sikh Confederacy	Durrani Empire; Malerkotla State	Sikh victory
Battle of Morinda (1764)	Sikh Confederacy	Durrani Empire; Ranghar	Sikh victory
Battle of Sirhind (1764)	Sikh Confederacy	Durrani Empire	Sikh victory
Battle of Delhi (1764)	Bharatpur State: Sikh Confederacy	Kingdom of Rohilkhand	Bharatpur and Sikh victory
Battle of Qarawal (1764)	Sikh Confederacy	Durrani Empire; Khanate of Kalat	Durrani victory
Battle of Amritsar (1767)	Sikh Confederacy	Durrani Empire	Sikh victory
Battle of Chunar (1770)	Sikh Confederacy	Bharatpur State; Maratha Confederacy	Sikh victory
Raid of Panipat (1770)	Sikh Confederacy	Kingdom of Rohilkhand; Mughal Empire	Indecisive
Siege of Kunjpura (1772)	Sikh Confederacy	Mughal Empire; Durrani Empire; Maratha Empire	Sikh victory
Siege of Patiala (1779)	Patiala State; Sikh Confederacy	Mughal Empire	Sikh victory
Battle of Rohtas (1779)	Sikh Confederacy	Durrani Empire	Durrani victory: Afghans reconquer Rohtas Fort
Battle of Shujabad (1780)	Sikh Confederacy	Durrani Empire	Durrani victory
Siege of Multan (1780)	Sikh Confederacy	Durrani Empire	Durrani victory: Afghans reconquer Multan
Battle of Delhi (1783)	Sikh Confederacy	Mughal Empire	Sikh victory
Battle of Gujrat (1797)	Sikh Confederacy	Durrani Empire	Sikh victory
Battle of Amritsar (1798)	Sikh Confederacy	Durrani Empire	Sikh victory

== Maps ==
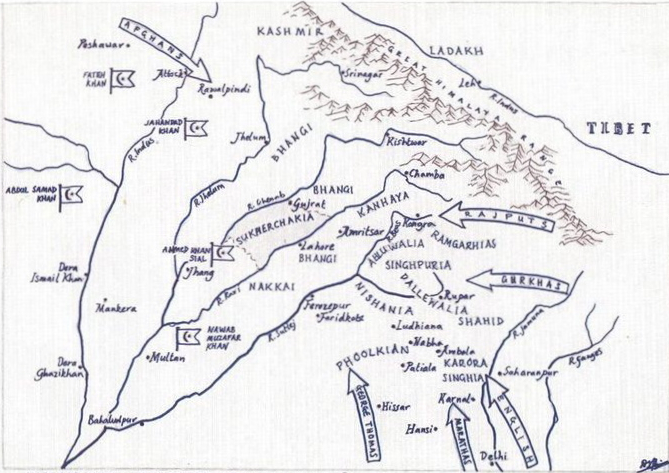
A map of the Punjab region showing general areas of the Misls in 1780

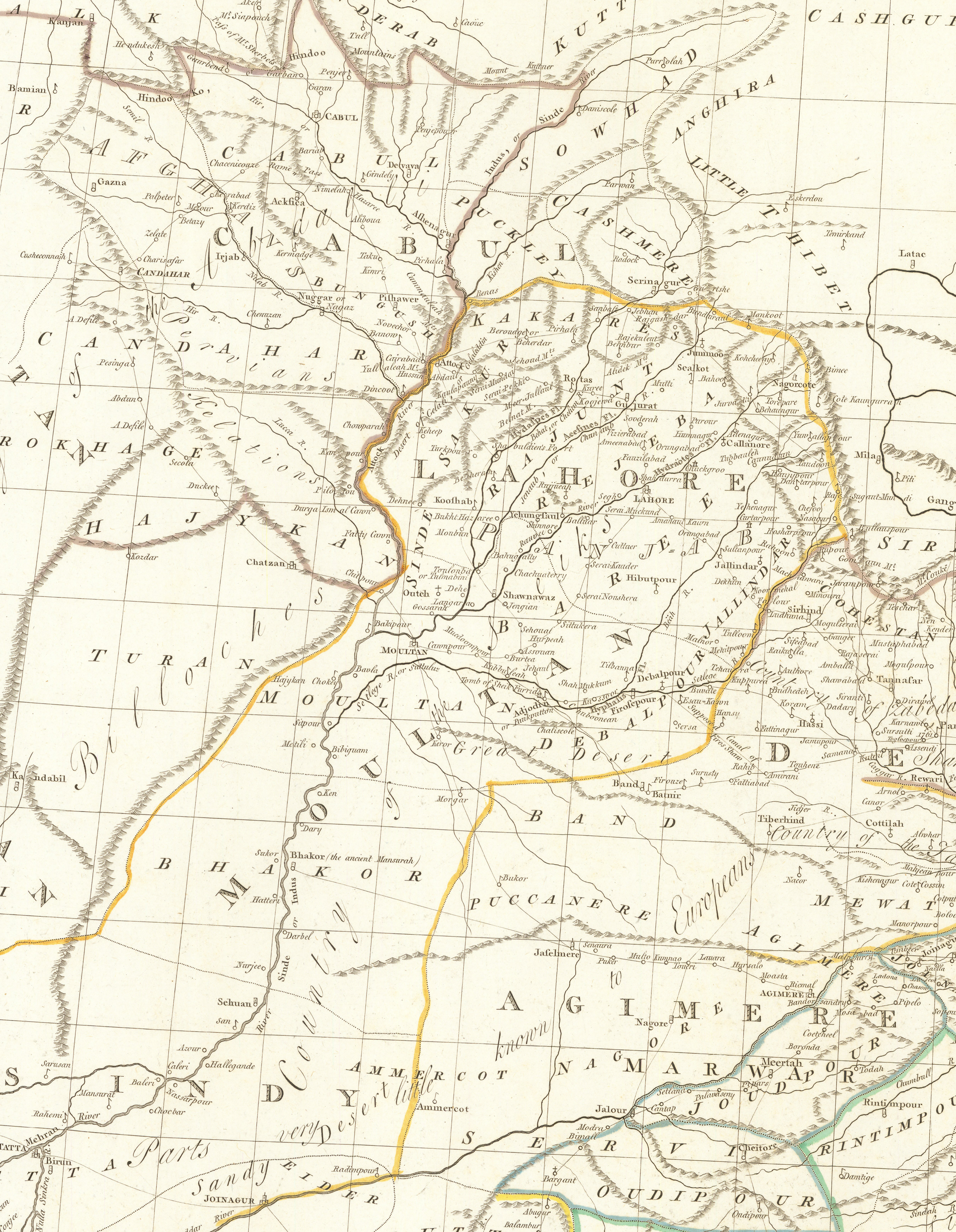
Map of the Punjab or "Country of the Sikhs" in 1782 by James Rennell

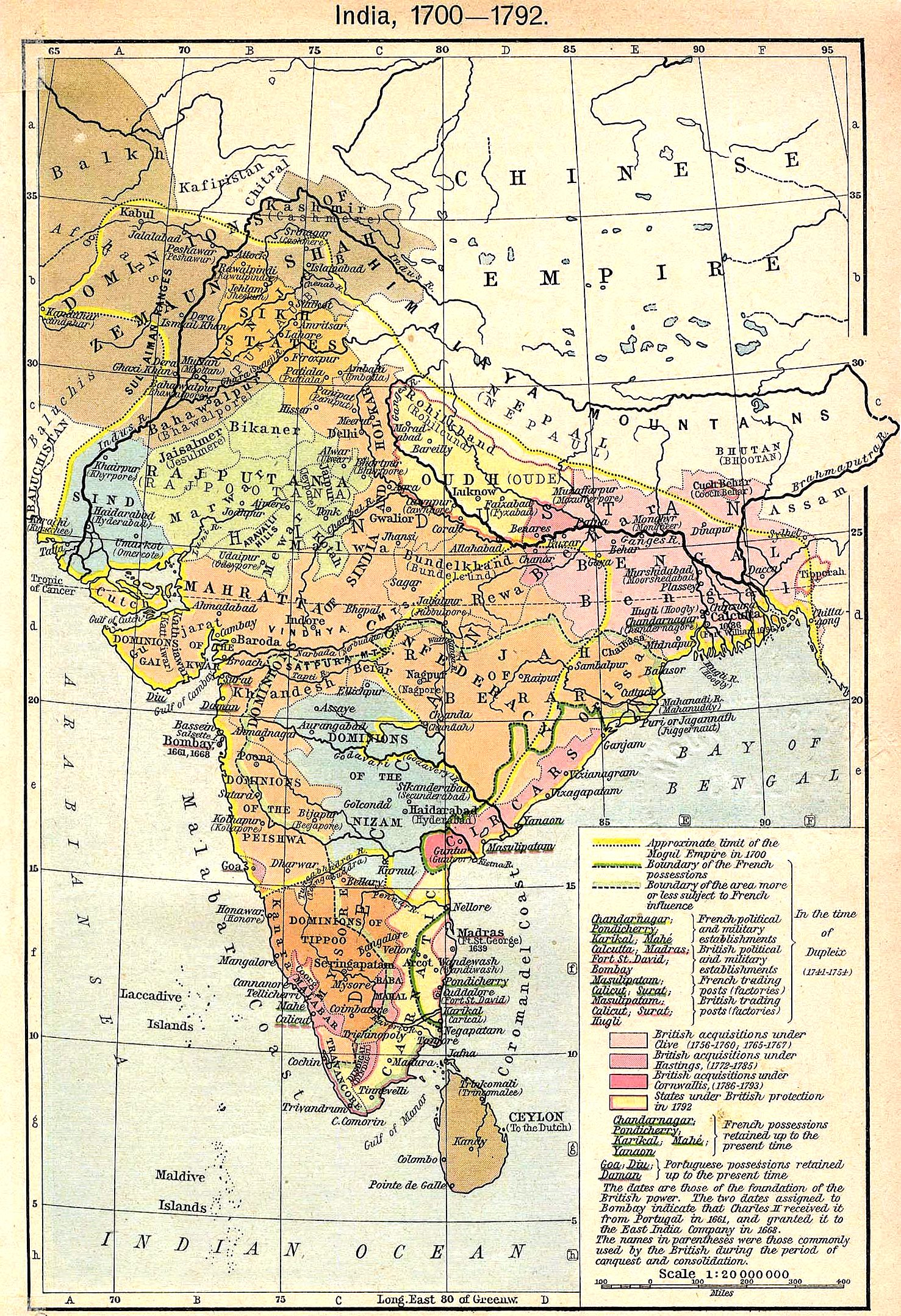
Political map created in 1923 of the Indian subcontinent during the years of 1700–1792

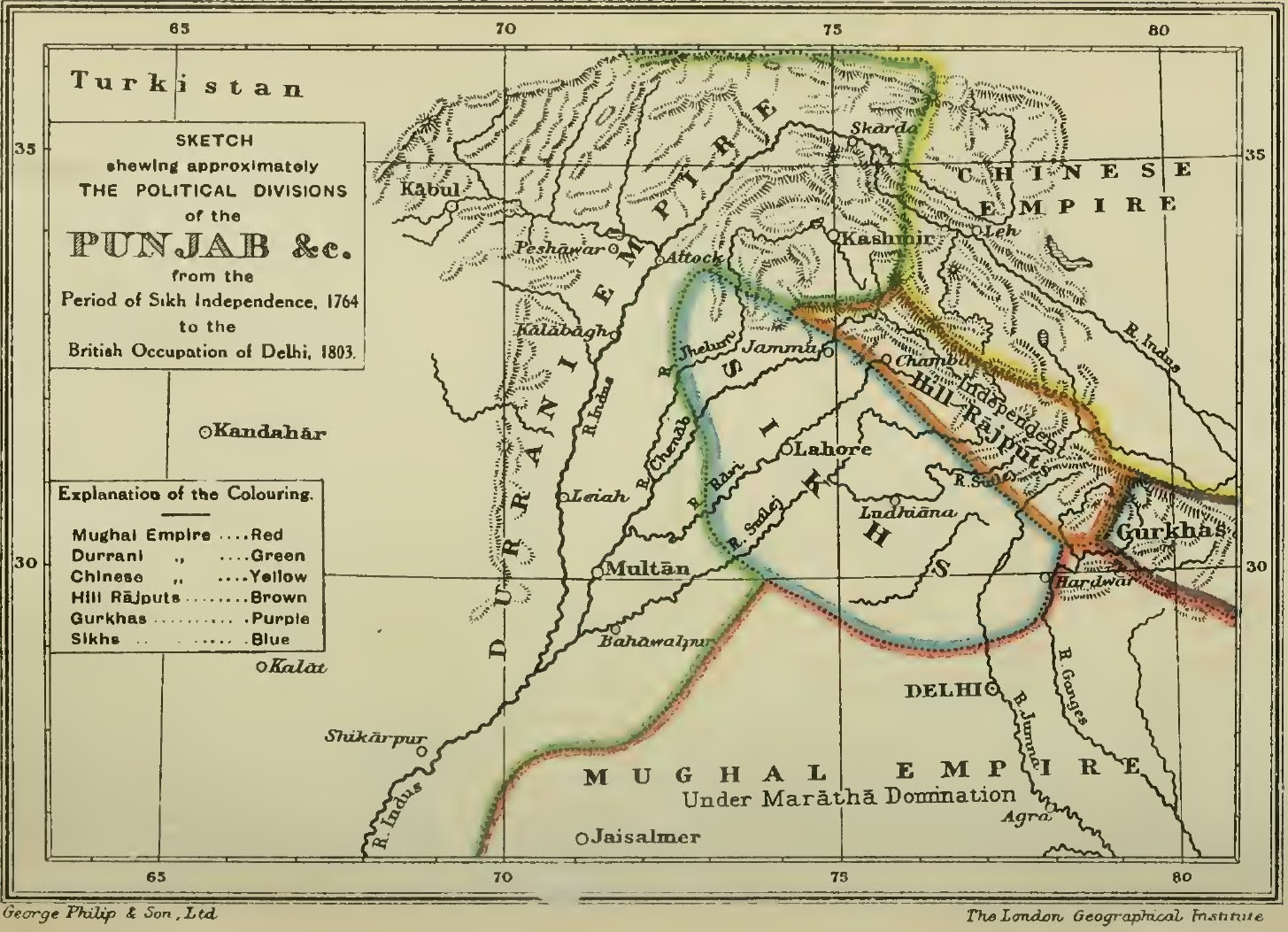
Approximate political map of Punjab from 1764 to 1803 by Joseph Davey Cunningham

== See also ==
- Dal Khalsa, the military forces of the Sikh Confederacy
- History of Punjab
- Jat Mahasabha
- Khap
- Maratha–Sikh clashes
- Chattha Dynasty, longstanding rivals of the Sukerchakia Misl

== Bibliography ==
- Nalwa, Vanit (2009), Hari Singh Nalwa – Champion of the Khalsaji, New Delhi: Manohar, ISBN 978-81-7304-785-5
- Narang, K. S.; Gupta, H. R. (1969). History of Punjab: 1500–1558.
- M'Gregor, William Lewis (1846). The history of the Sikhs: containing the lives of the Gooroos; the history of the independent Sirdars, or Missuls, and the life of the great founder of the Sikh monarchy, Maharajah Runjeet Singh. J. Madden. p. 216.
- Singh, Fauja (1964). Military system of the Sikhs: during the period 1799–1849. Motilal Banarsidass.
- Prinsep, Henry Thoby (1834). Origin of the Sikh power in the Punjab, and political life of Muha-Raja Runjeet Singh: with an account of the present condition, religion, laws and customs of the Sikhs. G.H. Huttmann.
- Cave-Browne, John (1861). The Punjab and Delhi in 1857: being a narrative of the measures by which the Punjab was saved and Delhi recovered during the Indian Mutiny. William Blackwood and Sons.
- Brief History of the Sikh Misls. Jalandhar: Sikh Missionary College.
- Suri, Sohan Lal (1961). Umdat-ut-Tawarikh, DAFTAR III, PARTS (I—V) 1831–1839 A.D. Delhi: S. Chand & Co.
- Kakshi, S.R.; Pathak, Rashmi; Bakshi, S.R.; Pathak, R. (2007). Punjab Through the Ages. Sarup and Son. ISBN 978-81-7625-738-1.
- Oberoi, Harjot (1994). The Construction of religious boundaries: culture, identity, and diversity in the Sikh tradition. University of Chicago Press. ISBN 978-0-226-61593-6.
- Ahmad Shah Batalia, Appendix to Sohan Lal Suri, Umdat-ut-Tawarikh. Daftar I, Lahore, 1X85, p. 15; Bute Shah, Tawarikh-i-Punjab, Daftar IV, (1848), (MS., Ganda Singh's personal collection. Patiala), p. 6; Kanaihya Lal, Tarikh-i-Punjab, Lahore, 1877, p. 88; Ali-ud-Din Mufti, Ibratnama, Vol. I, (1854), Lahore, 1961, p. 244. Muhammad Latif, History of the Punjab (1891), Delhi, 1964, p. 296.
- Ian Heath, The Sikh Army, 1799–1849 (Men-at-arms), Osprey (2005) ISBN 1-84176-777-8
- Harbans Singh, The Heritage of the Sikhs, second rev. ed., Manohar (1994) ISBN 81-7304-064-8
- Hari Ram Gupta, History of the Sikhs: Sikh Domination of the Mughal Empire, 1764–1803, second ed., Munshiram Manoharlal (2000) ISBN 81-215-0213-6
- Hari Ram Gupta, History of the Sikhs: The Sikh Commonwealth or Rise and Fall of the Misls, rev. ed., Munshiram Manoharlal (2001) ISBN 81-215-0165-2
- Gian Singh, Tawarikh Guru Khalsa, (ed. 1970), p. 261.
