= Battle of Amritsar (1798) =

Sikh victory over the Durrani Empire

- Part of Afghan–Sikh Wars
Date	24 November 1798
Location	Near Amritsar
Result	Sikh victory

Belligerents
Misaldar Army	Durrani Empire

Commanders and leaders
Ranjit Singh; Sahib Singh Bhangi; Jodh Singh; Gulab Singh; Budh Singh	Unknown

Strength
500 cavalrymen 2,000 Reinforcements	10,000

Casualties and losses
- 500 lost on both sides

The Battle of Amritsar was fought on 24 November 1798 between the Sikh forces led by Ranjit Singh and the Afghan forces led by Zaman Shah Durrani.

== Event ==
On 24 November 1798 Zaman Shah, occupying the city of Lahore, sent a force of 10,000 men to Amritsar. Ranjit Singh with Sahib Singh commanding 500 troops were patrolling the Lahore road near Amritsar. They saw the Afghans and immediately engaged in battle. Meanwhile, some Sikhs from Amritsar joined Ranjit Singh with 2,000 additional troops. About 500 men were killed on both sides which forced the Afghans to retreat back to Lahore.

== See also ==
- Nihang
- Martyrdom and Sikhism
