= Dallewalia Misl =

Sovereign state of the Sikh Confederacy

The Dallewalia Misl was one of the twelve misls of the Sikh Confederacy. The misl was founded by Sardar Gulab Singh, a Khatri Sikh, as a Jatha, but he was later succeeded by a Jatt Sikh named Tara Singh Ghaiba of the Kang clan. Tara Singh made the Jatha into a powerful misl in the 18th century. It held territory in the Jalandhar region and northern Malwa.

== History ==
=== Origins ===
The misl was founded by both Khatris and Jats. The founder of this Misl was Sardar Gulab Singh resident of the village of Dallewal near Dera Baba Nanak, in Doaba Bist Jalandhar. He took Pahul and became an active member of the Dal Khalsa in 1726 A.D and launched upon a career of chivalry, fighting against the tyrannical government of the Punjab. One day at the head of 150 comrades, he attacked Jalandhar and having obtained a rich booty all of them returned to their camp in the jungle safely.

In the mid-1740s, Dharam Singh, whom was associated with the Dallewalias, fought the forces of Mir Mannu and killed Subedar Amir Baig, with himself being killed during the conflict. A gurdwara dedicated to him, known as Gurdwara Shaheedganj Bhai Dharam Singh, is located in Lahore (31°33'56.8"N 74°19'04.5"E).

Gulab Singh, with his two brothers, Dayal Singh and Gurdyal Singh and two sons, Jaipal Singh and Hardyal Singh, actively participated in the chhota ghallughara in June 1746. In 1748, Gulab Singh was declared to be the head of the Dallewalias, with Gurdyal Singh and Tara Singh Ghaiba as his deputies

=== Skirmish with Najib Khan Rohilla of Najibabad ===
In the year 1756, in collaboration with his friend, Sardar Karora Singh, Gulab Singh attacked Najib Khan Rohilla of Najibabad. Nawab Doda Khan offered a stiff resistance in the beginning but shortly thereafter he escaped from the battlefield. Later, Gulab Singh chastised Nawab Zabita Khan of Meerut. Then, he turned his attention towards Muzaffarnagar, Deoband, Miranpur and Saharanpur. Finding themselves unable to face him, the rulers of these places offered tribute and paid obeisance to him.

=== Encounter with Ahmed Shah Abdali ===
In 1756-57, when Ahmad Shah Abdali, after plundering Delhi, was carrying with him a huge booty and many young Hindu girls, he was obstructed by the Sikhs at river Ravi and dispossessed of much of the booty. All the girls were got released from the Afghans and restored to their parents. Gulab Singh, accompanied by his men, actively participated in this enterprise. The same year, an intelligence of the Sikhs gave them an information that revenue, to the tune of five lakh rupees, collected from the area between Sarai Rawalpindi and Rohtas, was being carried to Lahore. Hearing this news Gulab Singh and Karora Singh, at the head of their men, attacked the guard that was escorting the treasure near Jhelum and took away the money with which they purchased provisions and distributed the same among the dais of the Khalsa.

=== Decline ===
Gulab Singh died in 1759, in the Battle of Kalanaur, 27 km west of Gurdaspur, fighting against Ambo Khan. His two sons, Jaipal Singh and Hardyal Singh had died earlier in the Battle of Basohli. So the leadership of the Misl was entrusted to Gurdyal Singh, one of the close associates of Gulab Singh. Gurdyal Singh also died about an year after the assumption of the Sardari of the Misal. Tara Singh succeeded Gurdyal Singh

After the death of Sardar Gulab Singh in 1759, his successor was Sardar Tara Singh Ghaiba (1717–1807), who ruled and further expanded his Misl up to Ambala Area (Haryana Region). With other Sikh Sardars he sacked the Kasur city of Pathans and joined the Sikh Sardars in the sack of Sirhind City in 1764. In 1807, after the death of Tara Singh Ghaiba, his territories were annexed to the empire of Ranjit Singh. The Dallewalia and Nishanwalia Jathas were stationed at Amritsar to protect the holy city.

== Territory ==
The misl originated from Dallewal near Jalandhar. The Dallewalias held territory in parts of Jalandhar and northern Malwa. The Dallewalia Misl controlled areas on the right-bank of the upper Sutlej river.

== Leaders ==
Prominent leaders of the misl were:

- Gulab Singh
- Tara Singh Gheba

== See also ==
- Sardar Gulab Singh
- Sardar Tara Singh Ghaiba
