= Dalewal =

- Village
- Location in Punjab, India Dalewal (India)
- Coordinates: 31.1023058°N 75.7677323°E
- Country: India
- State: Punjab
- District: Jalandhar
- Tehsil: Phillaur

Government
  - Type: Panchayat raj
  - Body: Gram panchayat
- Elevation: 246 m (807 ft)

Population (2011)
  - Total: 1,066
- Sex ratio 525/541 ♂/♀

Languages
  - Official: Punjabi
- Time zone: UTC+5:30 (IST)
- PIN: 144409
- Telephone: 01826
- ISO 3166 code: IN-PB
- Vehicle registration: PB- 37
- Post office: Goraya
- Website: jalandhar.nic.in

Dalewal is a village in Phillaur tehsil in Jalandhar district of Punjab State, India. It is located 3 km from Goraya, 30 km from district headquarter Jalandhar and 130 km from state capital Chandigarh. The village is administrated by a sarpanch who is an elected representative of village as per Panchayati raj (India).

== Education ==
The village has a Punjabi medium, SMART PRIMARY SCHOOL & co-ed upper primary school (GMS Dalewal). The school provides mid-day meals as per the Indian Midday Meal Scheme and the meals are prepared in school premises and was founded in 1997.

== Demography ==
As of 2011, Dalewal has a total number of 241 houses and population of 1066 of which 525 are males while 541 are females according to the report published by Census India in 2011. Literacy rate of Dalewal is 79.06%, higher than state average of 75.84%. The population of children under the age of 6 years is 87 which is 8.16% of total population of Dalewal, and child sex ratio is approximately 851 higher than state average of 846.

Most of the people are from Schedule Caste which constitutes 39.77% of total population in Dalewal. The town does not have any Schedule Tribe population so far.

As per census 2011, 265 people were engaged in work activities out of the total population of Dalewal which includes 239 males and 26 females. According to census survey report 2011, 97.36% workers describe their work as main work and 2.64% workers are involved in marginal activity providing livelihood for less than 6 months.

== Transport ==
Bhattian railway station is the nearest train station; however, Goraya train station is 4.8 km away from the village. The village is 43.4 km away from domestic airport in Ludhiana and the nearest international airport is located in Chandigarh also Sri Guru Ram Dass Jee International Airport is the second nearest airport which is 131 km away in Amritsar.

== See also ==
- Dallewalia Misl
