= Nishanwalia Misl =

Sovereign state of the Sikh Confederacy

- Status: Misl
- Capital: Ambala and Shahbad (initial); Zira (later)
- Common language: Punjabi
- Religion: Sikhism (dynastic); Islam; Hinduism
- Government: Theocracy
- Misldar
  - 1748-1767: Dasaundha Singh Shergill
  - 1767-1774: Sangat Singh Shergill
- Lal Singh and Gurbakhsh Singh
- Mohar Singh, Kapur Singh, and Anup Singh
  - 1786–1808, 1809–1823: Daya Kaur
- Legislature: Sarbat Khalsa
- Today part of: India

The Nishanwalia Misl, also spelt as Nishananvali Misl, was a Sikh misl. The Misl was founded by Dasaundha Singh Shergill a leader of Tarna Dal. The misl was ruled by the Shergill Jats. The misl was based in Ambala, Shahbad, and parts of the present-day Ludhiana district. The Nishanwalia Misl was more akin to a religious order rather than resembling a clan-based dynasty like most of the other misls of the Sikh Confederacy.

== History ==
The misl was formed on 29 March 1748. It was established by Jats. The leaders of this Misl used to carry the blue nishans (the flags) of the Sikh army during the battles; hence their name become Nishanwalia. The misl which was responsible for bearing the Nishan Sahib was the Nishanwalia Misl, named after this role. The Nishanwalia Misl also was responsible for appointing the flag-bearers for the other misls. The role assigned to carry the flag in procession was considered an honourable one.

Dasaundha Singh, son of Chowdhry Sahib Rai of village Mansurwala (near Kot Issa Khan) was the first chief of this Misl. Dasaundha Singh was assisted by his brother, Sangat Singh. Some other prominent figures of the Nishanwalia Misl were Jai Singh of Kairon village, and Kaur Singh and Man Singh of Dhand Kasel village in Amritsar district. These Nishanwalia figures all were earlier baptized into the Khalsa order by Diwan Darbara Singh (d. 1734).

The Nishanwalia Misl had strength of twelve thousand cavalry in 1765. It had captured Ambala, Shahbad-Markanda, Sarai Lashkari Khan, Doraha, Amloh, Zira, Singhanwala and some area around Sahnewal too; Dasaundha Singh died in a battle against Zabita Khan in 1767; he was succeeded by his brother Sangat Singh. Sangat Singh shifted his headquarters from Ambala to Zira, where he died in 1774. Sangat Singh had three sons, namely Kapur Singh, Mehar Singh, and Anup Singh, all of whom were children when their father died. After reaching adulthood, Mehar Singh took on the mantle of leadership of the misl in 1779 but was killed shortly after. Kapur Singh died in-battle. Thus, the sole-surviving son of Sangat Singh, Anup Singh, became the next head of the misl. Anup Singh died without an issue in 1797. In 1807, Maharaja Ranjit Singh occupied the land of the Nishanwalia Misl.

== Territory ==
The misl originated from Surdev in Malwa. The Nishanwalias held territory in northern Malwa. Specific areas controlled were Shahabad, ArnIo, and most of Ambala.

== Leaders ==
The list of rulers of the Nishanwalia Misl are as follows:

1. Dasaundha Singh (r. 1748–1767)
2. Sangat Singh (r. 1767–1774)
3. Mohar Singh (r. 1774–1785)
4. Gurbakhsh Singh (r. 1785–1786)
5. Daya Kaur (r. 1786–1808 & 1809–1823)
