= Jodh Singh Ramgarhia =

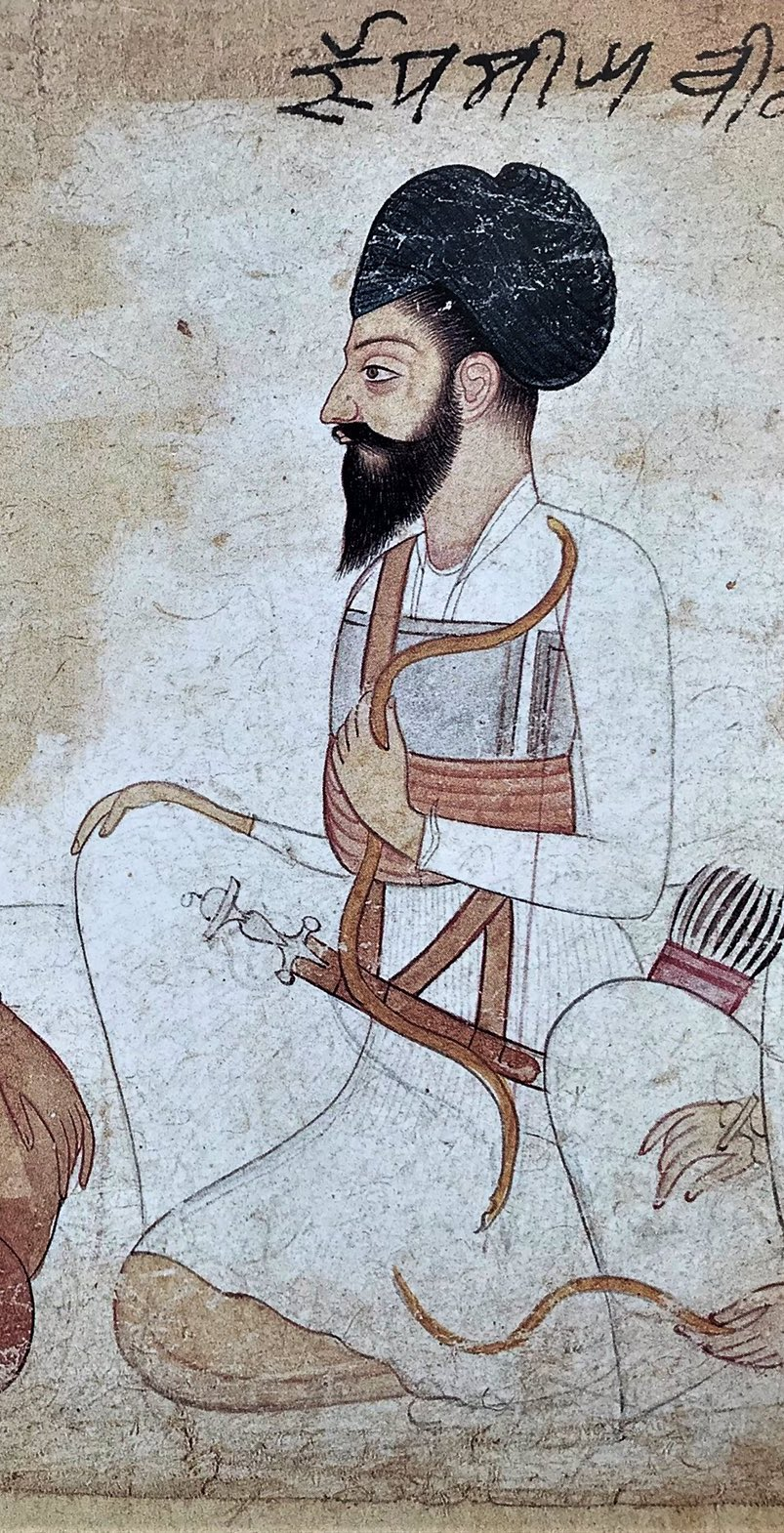
- Depiction of Jodh Singh Ramgarhia from an 18th-century painting by Purkhu of Kangra
- Born: 1758
- Died: 1815 (aged 56–57)
- Known for: Sardar of the Ramgarhia Misl
- Successor: Position Abolished, Misl absorbed into the Sikh Empire

Jodh Singh Ramgarhia (1758 – 23 August 1815) was a prominent Sikh leader of the Ramgarhia Misl in the Punjab, the son of Jassa Singh Ramgarhia who inherited Jassa's position on his death in 1803. His Ramgarhia followers played an important role in the struggle when Maharaja Ranjit Singh was establishing the Sikh Empire.

== Biography ==
Jodh Singh was the successor and son of Jassa Singh Ramgarhia. He had a close friendship with Ranjit Singh of the Sukerchakia Misl. Ranjit Singh had once announced a bond of friendship between him and Jodh Singh in the presence of the Guru Granth Sahib at the Golden Temple in Amritsar. The Sukerchakia chief and later Sikh emperor referred to Jodh Singh as "Babaji" and Jodh Singh was always seated beside Ranjit Singh when the latter held durbar (court).

Jodh Singh assisted Ranjit Singh in 1802 by assisting with the conquest of Amritsar from the Bhangis under the rule of Mai Sukhan, whom was the widow of Gulab Singh Bhangi.

Jodh was instrumental in persuading Mai Sukhan, widow of Gulab Singh Bhangi and ruler of Amritsar to surrender to Ranjit Singh on 24 February 1805 and to hand over the massive Zamzama gun.

He further assisted the emperor of the Sikhs in 1807 when Ranjit Singh led a month-long expedition against Qutb ud-Din of Kasur. He fought with Ranjit Singh in the Battle of Kasur, and was awarded many estates by the Maharajah.

Between 1810–11, Jodh Singh, assisted by Diwan Mokham Chand, annexed the lands that had been under the control of the Faizalpuria Misl.

During the tenure of Jodh Singh, architectural works, such as the Ramgarhia Bunga, were constructed. He was responsible for the construction of the Ramgarhia Bunga adjoining the Golden Temple of Amritsar, a residence for guards of the temple, using materials that had been collected by his father.

He also donated materials for the beautification renovations of the Golden Temple complex, including perforated marble and mosaics. He was also responsible for constructing the first two stories of the tower of Gurdwara Baba Atal Rai. Jodh Singh died in Amritsar in August 1815.

On his death in 1815 there was a dispute over succession to his estates between his widow, his brother Vir Singh and his cousins Diwan Singh and Mehtab Singh. The Maharajah eventually split the estates between them.

== Gallery ==
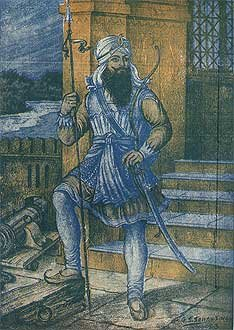
20th-century painting of Jodh Singh Ramgarhia
