= Ramgarhia Misl =

State in the Sikh confederacy (1707–1799)

- 1748–1808
- Status: Misl
- Capital: Ramsar (initial); Sri Hargobindpur (later)
- Common languages: Punjabi and its dialects
- Ethnic groups: Punjabis (with initially Jats and later Ramgarhias being the dynastic rulers)
- Religion: Sikhism (dynastic) • Islam • Hinduism
- Misldar (chief)
  - 1748 – 1803: Jassa Singh Ramgarhia
  - 1803 – 1808: Jodh Singh Ramgarhia
- History
  - Established: 1748
  - Disestablished: 1808
Preceded by	Succeeded by
Mughal Empire; Durrani Empire	Sikh Empire
- Today part of: Pakistan • India

Ramgarhia Misl (Punjabi: ਰਾਮਗੜ੍ਹੀਆ ਮਿਸਲ (Gurmukhi) • رامگڑھیا مسل (Shahmukhi)) was a sovereign state (misl) in the Sikh Confederacy of Punjab region in present-day India and Pakistan. The misl's name is derived from Qila Ramgarh, a place located in Ramsar, near Amritsar, which was fortified and redesigned by Ramgarhia Misl chief Jassa Singh Ramgarhia. The Ramgarhia Misl was one of the twelve major Sikh misls, and held land near Amritsar.

== History ==
=== Jatha ===
The misl was founded by Tarkhans and Jats. The Misl started out as a jatha (Sikh militia band) founded by a Jat named Khushal Singh, a native of Guga village near Amritsar, who had undergone the Pahul during the era of Banda Singh Bahadur. Khushal Singh fought in the later Mughal-Sikh Wars alongside Banda Singh Bahadur, distinguishing himself in the process. After Khushal, the leadership passed to another Jat named Nand Singh of Sanghani village near Amritsar. Another early leader was Hardas Singh.

Nand Singh helped increase the size of the jatha, with both areas of operation and power expanding. Jassa Singh Ichogillia, who was from the Thoka community took up a role in the jatha during the time of Nand Singh's tenure as leader, where he quickly became respected as a capable warrior. Jassa Singh joined the jatha after his father Bhagvan Singh had been killed in 1739 fighting against Nader Shah's invading forces. Jassa Singh learnt how to fight and about the art of warfare during this time. Nand Singh would later be succeeded by Jassa Singh after the former's death in around 1743.

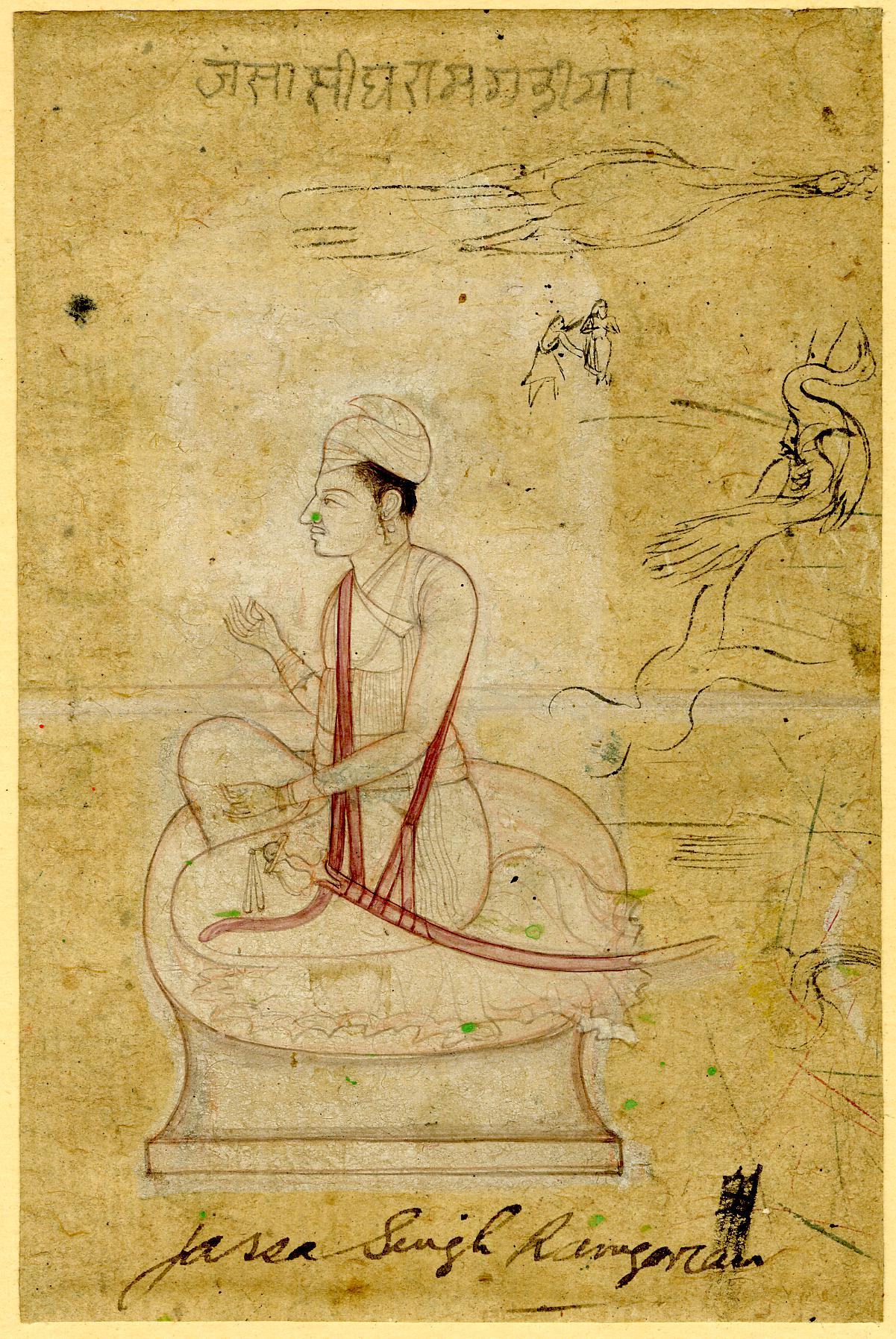
Painting of Jassa Singh Ramgarhia seated and armed with sword

In 1745, Jassa Singh was instructed to meet with Adina Beg to come to an agreement as the latter had been harassing Sikhs of the Jalandhar Doab under the orders of the Subahdar, Zakaria Khan. Adina Beg convinced Jassa to work for him, offering him a position of commanding a regiment consisting of 100 Sikhs and 60 Hindus. Jassa Singh took up the offer, which annoyed the other Sikhs in the diplomatic mission. Jassa Singh worked for Adina Beg in the company of his brothers Jai Singh (Note: Not to be confused with Jai Singh Kanhaiya, who was not a blood-relative of Jassa Singh Ramgarhia.), Khushal Singh (Note: Not to be confused with Khushal Singh from Guga village, who was a Jat and the founder of the Jatha that Jassa Singh Ramgarhia had joined.), and Mali Singh. Many Sikhs began to think of Jassa Singh as a traitor for working under Adina Beg.

Jassa Singh then took up employment under Adina Beg yet again. During this time, Adina Beg launched an attack on the Sikhs in Amritsar during the festival of Diwali in October 1748 and 500 Sikhs were holed up in the fort of Ram Rauni, with Jassa Singh assisting with the besiegement against his fellow Sikhs. The siege would last for three months resulting in the deaths of 200 Sikhs. Jassa Singh felt guilty about fighting against his religious kin and the besieged Sikhs, who were in a desperate position at this point, invited Jassa Singh to join their side by sending him a letter. They promised to forgive the former of his past transgressions if he did so but gave him an ultimatum that if he refused, he would be forever excommunicated from the Sikh faith. Jassa Singh readily took up the offer and switched sides. Jassa Singh then sent word to Kaura Mal, a man who was partial towards the sympathies of the Sikhs, to end the siege. Kaura Mal appealed to Mir Mannu to cancel the offensive, which he obliged and did so. However, the Sikh fortress of Ram Rauni had been utterly devastated by the siege. Mir Mannu then issued a jagir grant to the Sikhs.

=== Misl ===
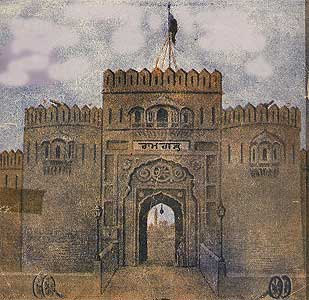
One of the very few photographs taken of Qila Ram Rauni, later known as Qila Ramgarh

At the annual Diwali meeting of the Sarbat Khalsa in Amritsar in 1748, a Gurmata was passed that reorganized the various scattered and numerous jathas into eleven organized Misls, with the Ramgarhia Misl forming out of this judgement.

Jassa Singh then made the former besieged fort of Ram Rauni his base, commissioning the repairs of the structure. The fortress was originally an enclosure of unbaked bricks (mud-fortress) but would later be fortified further by Jassa.

Shortly after, hostilities between Mir Mannu and the Sikhs arose again and Mir Mannu sent Adina Beg and Sadiq Beg to attack the fort of Ramgarh, where its defenders were defeated and the fort itself was destroyed in the process. Jassa Singh managed to escape the enemy and went into hiding in a place of safety. The Ramgarhia Misl rebuilt the fortress in the aftermath of the death of Mir Mannu in November 1753. The rebuilt fort was renamed as Ramgarh ("Ram" meaning "God" and "Garh" meaning 'fort') by Jassa. Jassa Singh himself, originally known as 'Jassa Singh Ichogillia' (after his native village) or 'Jassa Singh Thoka' (after his caste), began to be called 'Jassa Singh Ramgarhia' after this point. The carpenter caste in-which he came from, the Thokas, also began to collectively refer to themselves as 'Ramgarhias' as well.

As Quila Ramgarh was fortified to defend the Golden Temple from invaders, this misl acquired the name Ramgarhia, which literally means Custodians of the Fort of God. Quila Ramgarh and Ramgarhia Bunga are symbols of the Ramgarhia Sikh community's identity, their historic sacrifices and contribution to defending the Golden Temple over the centuries.

In 1757, Timur Shah Durrani attacked Ramgarh Fort and destroyed it in the process. When Timur was pushed out of the Punjab in 1758 by a joint force of Sikhs, Marathas, and Mughals, the Ramgarhia Misl rebuilt the fort.

In April 1758, the now-governor Adina Beg launched an attack against the Sikhs led by Mir Aziz Bakhshi. Many of the Sikhs, whom had been hiding out in the jungles, decided to hole up in Ramgarh Fort for their own protection. Amongst these Sikhs were Jassa Singh Ramgarhia, Jai Singh Kanhaiya, and Amar Singh Kingra. Eventually, after a hard-fought defence against the besiegers, the Sikhs were pushed to evacuate the fortress.

Adina Beg died in September 1758 and Jassa Singh Ramgarhia and Jai Singh Kanhaiya took this as an opportunity to expand their grip by working together, bringing many areas of the Punjab under their writ in the process. Eventually, land in four out of the five doabs of the Punjab were controlled by the Ramgarhia and Kanhaiya misls. A fertile region north of Amritsar, called Riarki, was brought under the control of Jassa. In only a decade's time, Jassa had elevated himself to becoming one of the most important Sardars of the Dal Khalsa.

The Ramgarhia Misl warred against Zain Khan Sirhindi and Jahan Khan Lahori. It further assisted in the joint Sikh invasion of Bharatpur.

Jassa Singh and his brother, Mali Singh, launched looting raids against the Hill States during the 1770s. The Pahari Rajas of the Shivalik range, such as Raja Ghumand Chand Katoch of Kangra and the rajas of other states such as Haripur, Jaswan, Datarpur, and other petty Hill States, decided to become tributary states of the Ramgarhia Misl for their own safety and protection, paying a tribute of 200,000 rupees per annum at that time to the Misl. A fortress was constructed at Talwara (near Batala) on the banks of the Beas River to keep watch over the Hill Rajas and Jassa Singh gave command over it to his brother, Mali Singh, alongside 4,000 horses for the purpose. The control of Kalanaur was handed over to the other brother of Jassa Singh Ramgarhia, named Tara Singh.

The Ramgarhias also conquered many parganas of the Majha region of Punjab, such as Batala, Kalanaur, Mastiwal, Dasuha, Talwara Lakhpur, Sanguwala, Sharif Chak, Miani, Begowal, amidst others. The Majhai territory led to an income of 700,000 rupees per annum of the Misl.

By this point, the misl had a cavalary force that was 10,000-strong. The Ramgarhia Misl made Batala yield to them in February to March of 1763. Ramgarhia power kept on increasing and eventually the local zamindars of the taluqas of Phagwara and Batala (such as Jandiala, Toli, and Qadhian) started paying tribute to the misl. After this, the areas of Urmar Tanda, Yahyapur, and parts of Hoshiarpur were brought under Ramgarhia writ, increasing the income by a million rupees.

At some point, the entire Shivalik Range from the Beas to the Ravi rivers were under the control of the Ramgarhias, including the plains region of the Jalandhar Doab. The capital was then moved from Rambagh fort in Ramsar, Amritsar to Sri Hargobindpur.

The Misl offered protection to its tributary states. A historical example of this is when the misl protected Chamba State against the forces of Ranjit Deo of Jammu State.

==== Inter-misl warfare ====
Eventually the various Sikh misls began warring with each other once outside threats subsided, such as the Afghans. The Kanhaiya and Ramgarhia misls, former allies, began a strife. The roots of the newfound animosity between the former allies is traced back to when they launched a joint raid on Kasur in 1763. During this raid, a large amount of plunder was captured by the misls. Whilst normally the misls would share loot, this time Mali Singh, brother of Jassa Singh Ramgarhia, decided to conceal especially valuable loot from Jai Singh Kanhaiya. When Jai Singh discovered this betrayal, the friendship between the two misls was shattered.

Antagonism between the Ramgarhias and their subordinate state, Kangra, began when the ruler of Kangra made an egotistical remark which Jassa Singh rebuked, which angered the Pahari ruler. The Kangra raja then decided to end his status as suzerain with the overlording misl. Kangra State went to battle against their former overlords but could not best them so they requested the assistance of the Kanhaiyas by promising to pay for any costs incurred. The joint Kangra-Kanhaiya force was still defeated by the Ramgarhias and their territory was plundered in the aftermath, which led to Jai Singh Kanhaiya developing an even deeper-set grudge against the Ramgarhias.

In 1774, the Kanhaiya Misl managed to take control over the Kangra throne, which greatly retarded the Ramgarhia influence in the region.

The Bhangis came into a conflict with the Kanhaiyas over territory. This conflict eventually brought the Ahluwalias and Ramgarhias into the mix. The Ahluwalias sided with the Kanhaiyas whilst the Ramgarhias sided with Ganda Singh of the Bhangi Misl. The Battle of Dinanagar in 1775 pitted the Ramgarhia and Bhangi misls on one side against the forces of the Kanhaiya and Sukerchakia misls on the other. Ganda Singh died from sickness during the battle. After the death of their leader, the Bhangi forces fled the battlefield which left the Ramgarhias embarrassed.

Later, animosities began appearing between the Ramgarhia and Ahluwalia misls, when the latter misl took control of Zahura, formerly controlled by the Ramgarhias. The Ahluwalias then bestowed the captured locality of Zahura to the Karorsinghia Misl. After this affair, Jassa Singh Ramgarhia and Jassa Singh Ahluwalia became hostile to each other and a rivalry developed.

At some point, the Ramgarhias attacked the Ahluwalias and captured their leader, Jassa Singh Ahluwalia. However, they released him shortly after escorted in a palanquin and gave him gifts (including a robe of honour) because he was highly-revered amongst the Sikhs. But Jassa Singh Ahluwalia never forgot this event of being taken prisoner by the Ramgarhias and harboured resentment against them. Jassa Singh Ahluwalia decided to organize a coalition to destroy the Ramgarhias once and for all.

Negative relations began arising between the Ramgarhia and Sukerchakia misls. The Ramgarhias went to battle against the Sukerchakias and managed to capture highly-coveted zamburak light-artillery (camel-mounted swivel cannons) and other loot from the Sukerchakias. Charat Singh's power had been devastated in his defeat against the Ramgarhias. Thus, the Sukerchakias decided to join the anti-Ramgarhia coalition of misls and states consisting of the Kanhaiyas, Kangra, and Ahluwalias.

The coalition continued assailing the Ramgarhias. The Kangra ruler, Ghumand Chand, died in the meantime and was succeeded by his issue, Nek Chand. Nek Chand continued associating with the anti-Ramgarhia coalition. The coalition continued their attacks against their enemy for four years. Takings and income from the Ramgarhian-controlled tributary states located in the Shivalik Hills declined during this time but the Ramgarhias still survived the onslaught. Eventually, the anti-Ramgarhia coalition was joined by Charat Singh Sukerchakia, Haqiqat Singh Kanhaiya, Ganda Singh Bhangi, Jhanda Singh Bhangi, and Nar Singh Chamiariwala.

The Kanhaiyas, due to the antics of Gurbaksh Singh Kanhaiya, managed to capture Dasuha and then attacked Batala in 1780. Batala had been under Ramgarhia control but was locally looked after by Mali Singh, who was despised by the local people due to his cruelty. Thus, it was easy for the Kanhaiyas to evict the Ramgarhias from Batala as they had the support of the local residents on their side. Then, Haqiqat Singh Kanhaiya marched upon Kalanaur and captured it from the local Ramgarhia caretaker, Tara Singh.

==== Exile from Punjab ====
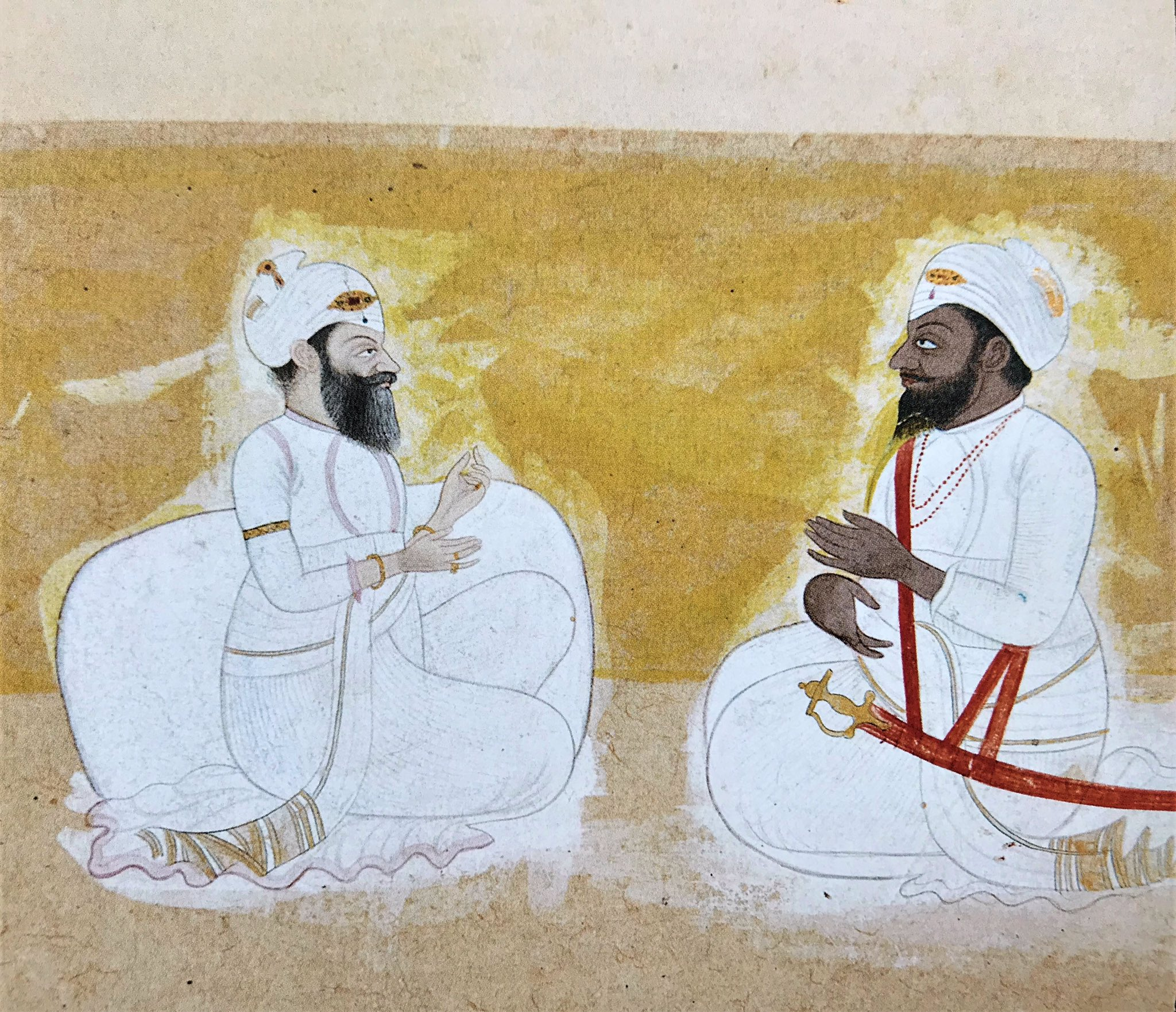
Sardar Jassa Singh Ramgarhia on left and Amar Singh of Patiala on right, late 18th century

Slowly and surely, the Ramgarhia territory was occupied by other misls and states until none remained so they escaped to the Malwa region. The coalition succeeded in pushing the outnumbered and overpowered Ramgarhias out of the Punjab. The Ramgarhias then found a new base in Hisar, located in modern-day Haryana. At this point of time, they had a force of 4,000 cavalrymen. In this most precarious state of affairs, the Ramgarhias were assisted by a local Sikh ruler, Amar Singh of Patiala, who bestowed a jagir upon them at Hisar and Hansi.

===== Conquest of Delhi =====
While based in Hisar, the Ramgarhias raised their ranks with irregular cavalrymen and started launching attacks on the suburban areas surrounding the city of Delhi, the gate of the city itself, and deeper raids into the Ganges-Yamuna Doab.

The parganas past the Jamuna River, such as Sambhal, Chandausi, Kash Ganj, Khurja, Sikandra, and Meerut amidst others, were all targets of the Ramgarhias.

A coalition of Sikhs chiefs under the leadership of Jassa Singh Ramgarhia attacked Delhi and briefly held it in early 1783. On 11 March 1783, Jassa Singh Ahluwalia tried to throne himself as the king of Delhi by seating himself on the Mughal throne and attempted to coronate his position but Jassa Singh Ramgarhia challenged him and requested him to stop, which the former obliged.

They seized the granite slab of Takht-e-Taus from the Red Fort on which, according to oral tradition, all Mughal emperors were crowned in Delhi and brought it to Amritsar as a symbol of their victory. This green slab was placed in Ramgarhia Bunga at Amritsar, where it still lies.

During one of the raids of Delhi, the Mohalla Mughlan was plundered, areas were set ablaze, and four guns were captured from the Mughal arsenal. The Mughal Emperor, Shah Alam, appealed to the sympathies and morality of Jassa Singh Ramgarhia to not burn down the city. The local people of Delhi managed to gather a sum of 500 rupees to save their city from the Ramgarhias.

After the conquest of Delhi, the Ramgarhias ventured further to invade Meerut and imposed an annual tribute of 10,000 rupees on the local ruler, Nawab Zabita Khan. After this, a large Sikh cavalary force 30,000-strong commanded jointly by Jassa Singh Ramgarhia and Karam Singh (of the Shaheedan Misl) pillaged the area of Saharanpur district.

One day, a Brahmin petitioned the Ramgarhias to help save his two daughtered who had been captured by the local governor of Hisar. Thus, the Ramgarhias sent a force to recover the girls, who were eventually brought back to their father.

The Ramgarhias stayed around in the cis-Sutlej area for a period of around five years.

==== Return to Punjab ====
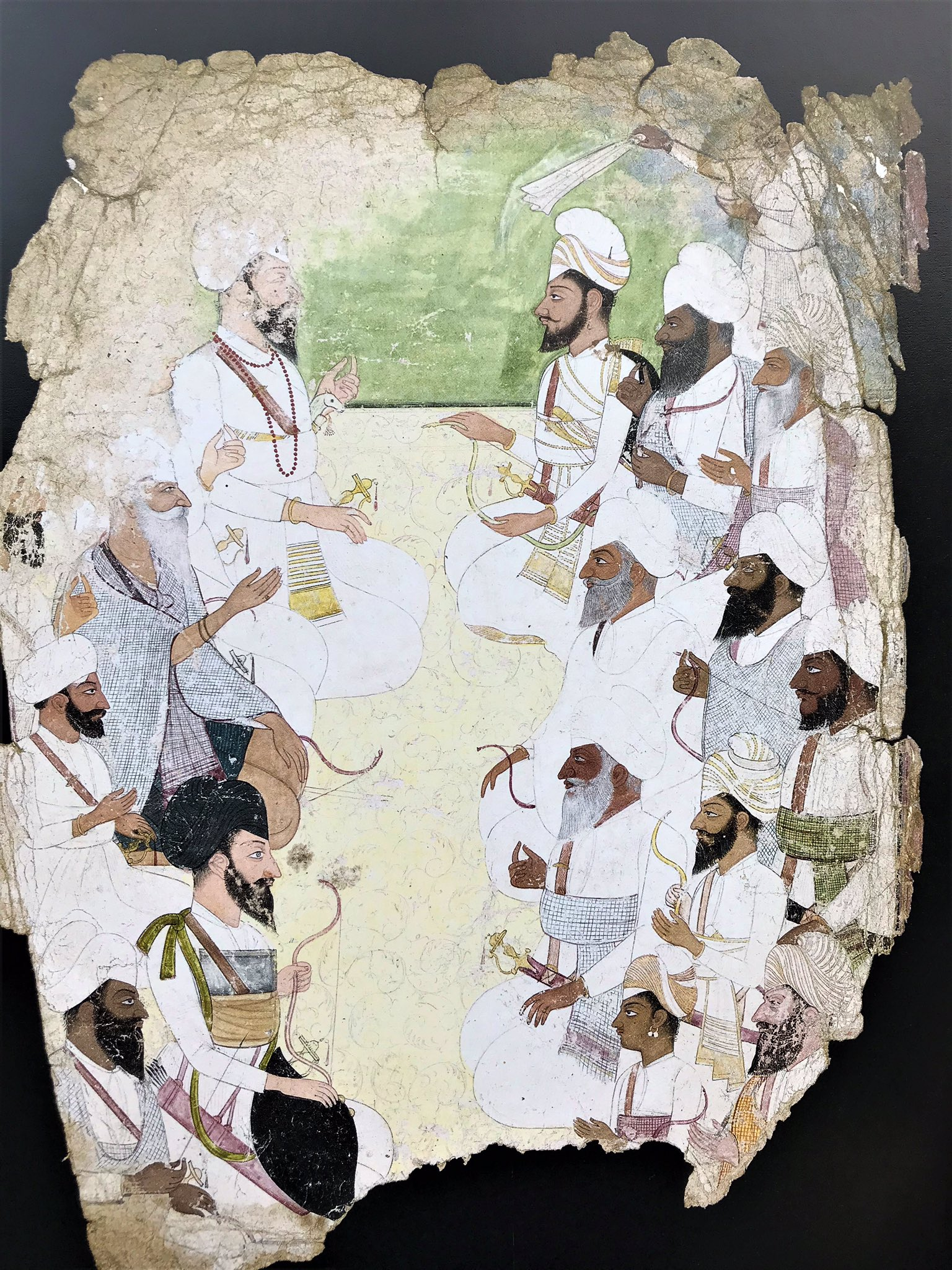
Ramgarhia and Sukarchakia Misls hold a diplomatic meeting. Jassa Singh Ramgarhia (long, white beard) on left. Maha Singh with checked blanket covering chest on the right, in centre. Jodh Singh can also be seen.

When the Ahluwalia Misl leader, Jassa Singh Ahluwalia, died in October 1783, the alliances of the various misls experienced a shake-up, with the Kanhaiya and Sukerchakia Misls turning from allies to enemies, and soon Mahan Singh of the Sukerchakia Misl, a former enemy of the Ramgarhias, invited the Ramgarhias back to Punjab.

The Sukerchakias had a falling-out with the Kanhaiyas because Jai Singh Kanhaiya had made an extremely rude remark to Mahan Singh during the annual Diwali gathering at Amritsar in 1785. Mahan Singh had come to visit Jai Singh Kanhaiya (who had grown jealous of the increasing Sukerchakia power) to pay his respect but was insulted instead and called a "bhagtia" (meaning "dancing boy") by the Kanhaiya misldar. To add insult to injury, the Kanhaiya chief also demanded a share of the plunder that the Sukerchakias had obtained from Jammu. This obviously infuriarated Mahan Singh, who realized he needed an ally against the Kanhaiyas and so he looked towards the Ramgarhias and decided to extend a hand.

Mahan Singh gave an offer to the Ramgarhias to recover their lost Punjabi territory. The Ramgarhias and Sukerchakias then jointly worked together to destroy the Kanhaiyas. They were also joined by Sansar Chand Katoch of the Kangra State in this affair. They launched a joint attack at Batala in 1787, resulting in one of the Kanhaiya Sardars, Gurbaksh Singh, dying in battle. The Kanhaiyas were defeated in the conflict. This led to both the Ramgarhias and Kangra State winning back land that had previously been taken from them by the Kanhaiyas.

After the destruction of Kanhaiya power, the Ramgarhias set-up Batala as their new base of operations and constructed fortifications, including a large and reinforced wall, at the location.

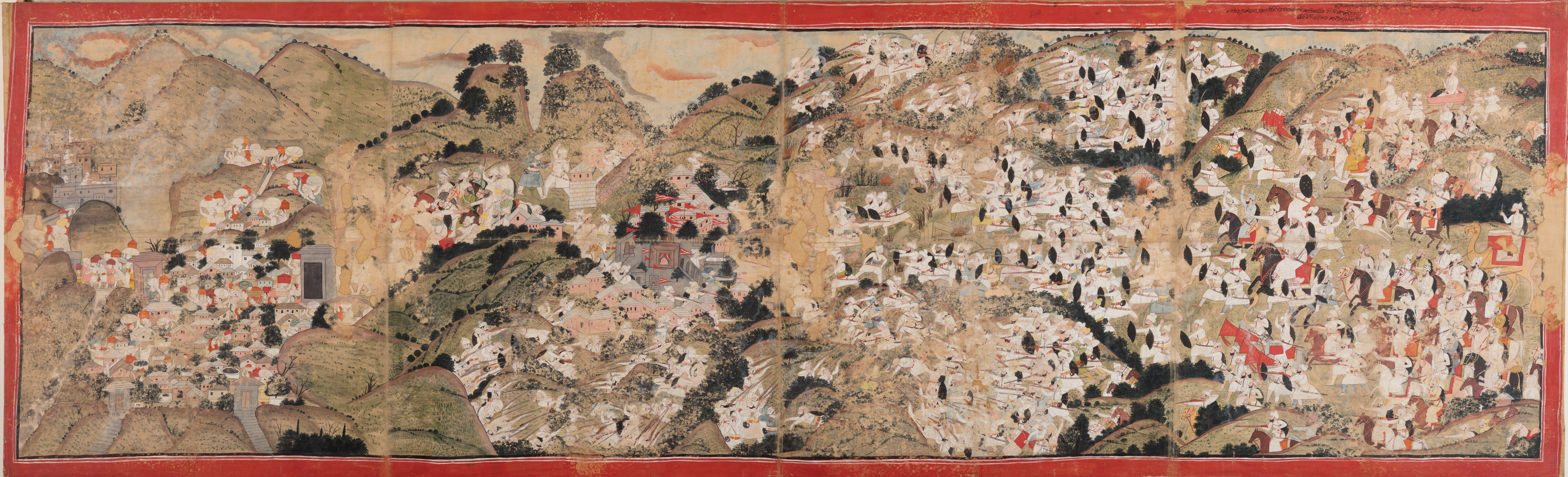
Raja Sansar Chand attacking Kangra Fort, ca.1782

But the Kanhaiyas remained at Kangra Fort, so Jassa Singh Ramgarhia made a scheme with Sansar Chand Katoch to win over the fort and finally ruin the Kanhaiyas totally. However, fate turned against the Ramgarhias as Jai Singh Kanhaiya made a matrimonial alliance with the Sukerchakias, by wedding his granddaughter (daughter of the deceased Gurbaksh Singh) to Ranjit Singh, son of Mahan Singh. Thus, the Sukerchakias and Kangra State turned from allies to enemies of the Ramgarhias once again. Ramgarhia control over Batala and Kalanaur was lost shortly after.

Jassa Singh Ramgarhia launched an expedition against Jaimal Singh, who was the son of Haqiqat Singh Kanhaiya.

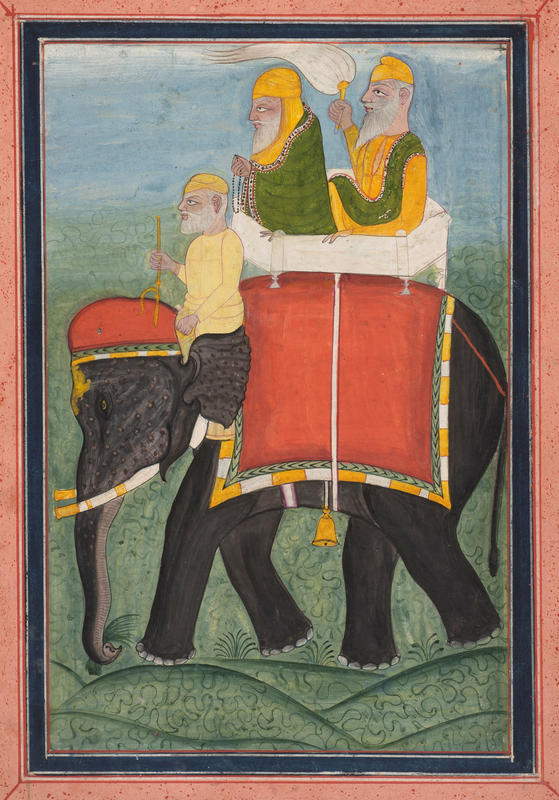
Painting of Sahib Singh Bedi being transported on an elephant, ca.1850

In 1796, a conflict arose between the Kanhaiyas led by the widow of Gurbaksh Singh, Sada Kaur, and the Ramgarhias. Sada Kaur, assisted by Ranjit Singh (who had succeeded his father Mahan Singh as leader of the Sukerchakia Misl), launched an attack on the Ramgarhias, who were holed out in Miani Fort, located near the Beas River. The situation turned desperate for the Ramgarhias so Jassa Singh Ramgarhia sent a message to Sahib Singh Bedi, the descendent of Guru Nanak, to help him. Sahib Singh Bedi requested to Sada Kaur and Ranjit Singh to lift the siege of the Miani Fort but Sada Kaur held such a deep grudge over the loss of her husband at the hands of the Ramgarhias that she ignored Sahib Singh Bedi's command and continued the siege anyway. Jassa Singh Ramgarhia appealed to Sahib Singh Bedi to ask them once again to lift the siege but Sahib Singh consoled the Ramgarhia chief by telling him God would help him. The night of the day the messenger arrived with this message from Sahib Singh Bedi, the river Beas flooded and swept away the besieging Kanhaiya and Sukerchakia forces. Sada Kaur and Ranjit Singh barely managed to escape and departed to Gujranwala.

In the year 1800 during Holi celebrations, a coalition of concerned Sikh chiefs, consisting of Sahib Singh of Gujrat, Gulab Singh Bhangi, Jassa Singh Ramgarhia, and Nizam-ud-Din of Kasur, who all wanted to check rising Sukerchakia power, led a force to Bhasin located east of Lahore to threaten the Sukerchakias. The two imposing forces faced each-other for two months straight with no obvious conflict taking place. During this face-off, Gulab Singh Bhangi died due to alcoholism. Eventually, the face-off ended with no result.

In the final years of Jassa Singh Ramgarhia's life, he resided at his capital, Sri Hargobindpur, and held cordial relations with the Bhangi Misl.

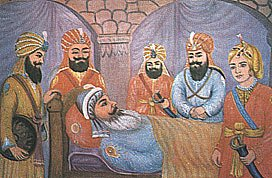
Sardar Jassa Singh Ramgarhia on his death bed surrounded by his brothers Alli Singh, Malli Singh, Tara Singh and his son Jodh Singh Ramgarhia

At the height of Ramgarhia power under the tenure of Jassa Singh Ramgarhia, the misl controlled a wide span of territory ranging from areas of the Bari Doab including Batala, Kalanaur, Dinanagar, Sri Hargobindpur, Shahpur Kandi, Gurdaspur, Qadian, Ghuman, Matteval, and in the Jalandhar Doab areas of Urmur Tanda, Sarih, Miani, Garhdiwala, and Zahura. Of the various Hill States of the Shivalik Range, the states of Kangra, Nurpur, Mandi, and Chamba were tributary states and paid the misl a levy of 200,000 rupees.

Jassa Singh Ramgarhia died on 20 April 1803 and was succeeded as head of the misl by one of his sons, Jodh Singh Ramgarhia.

==== Tenure of Jodh Singh ====
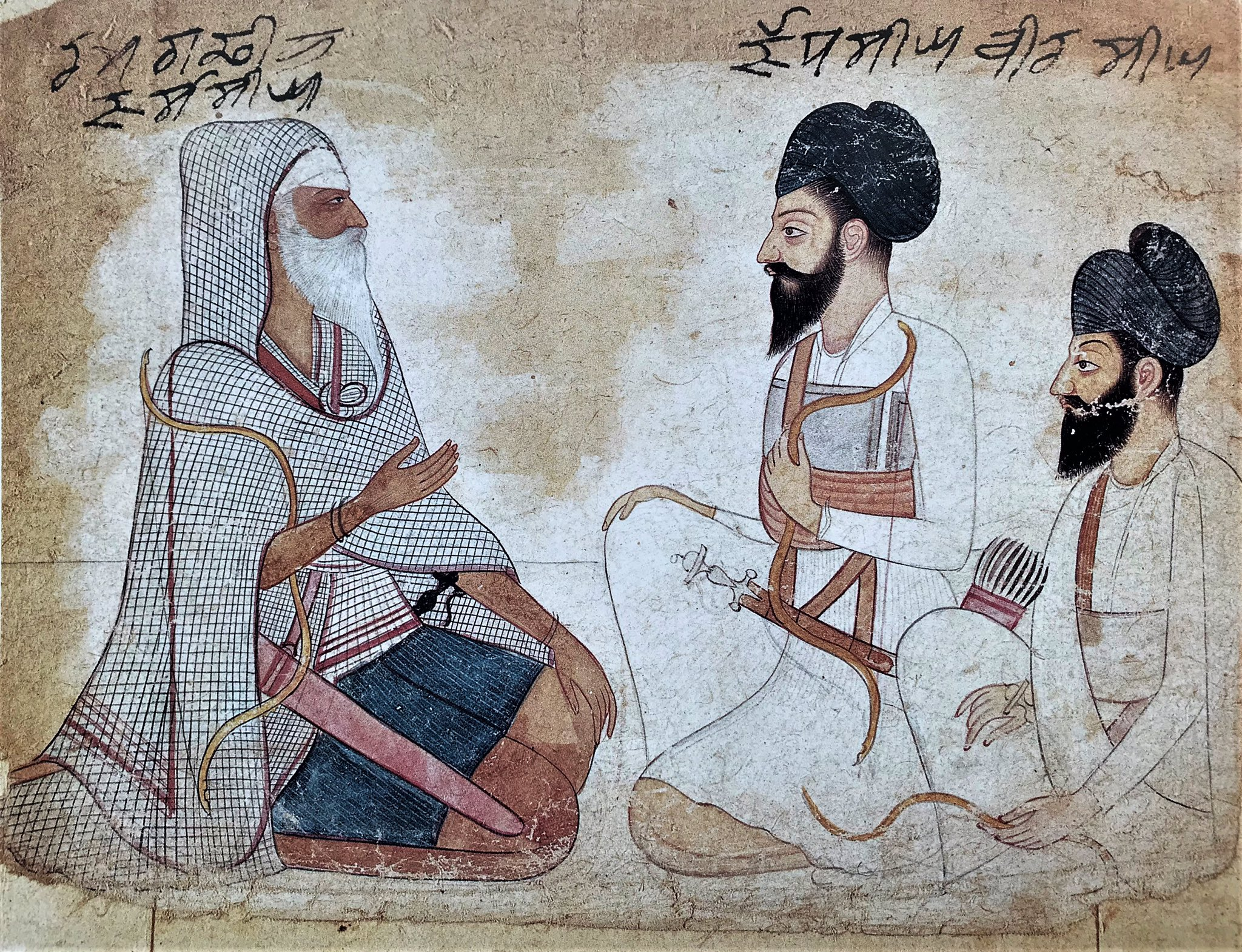
Jassa Singh Ramgharia with sons, Jodh Singh and Bir Singh

Jodh Singh was the successor and son of Jassa Singh Ramgarhia. Jodh Singh worked together with the Kangra ruler, Sansar Chand, and managed to take control of the parganas of Batala, Bhunga, and Hoshiarpur plus encompassing areas. Jodh Singh's territory began to be intruded upon by Divan Singh, who was the son of Tara Singh and a cousin of Jodh.

Jodh Singh assisted Ranjit Singh in 1802 by assisting with the conquest of Amritsar from the Bhangis under the rule of Mai Sukhan, whom was the widow of Gulab Singh Bhangi. However, in 1805, Ranjit Singh demanded that Mai Sukhan's Bhangi Misl give-up possession of the zamzama cannon and bestow it upon him. Jodh Singh secrely supported Mai Sukhan against Ranjit Singh by sending 300 warriors to strengthen her defence against Ranjit. Jodh Singh thought it was best that the Bhangis give-up their possession of the cannon or destroy it but Mai Sukhan did not go with these ideas and decided to totally refuse Ranjit Singh and stand against him. Ranjit Singh, supported by Sada Kaur and Fateh Singh Ahluwalia, then launched an attack but Jodh Singh and Akali Phula Singh managed to intercede to stop the violence between the Sikhs. Mai Sukhan and Gurdit Singh Bhangi then formed a close relationship with Jodh Singh, even staying with him for a short period of time.

The relationship between the Ramgarhias and Kangra State became precarious due to the Ramgarhias not being of much help against the Gurkhas.

Ranjit Singh decided to befriend the Ramgarhias and wrote to Jodh Singh. He wanted Jodh Singh to meet him in Lahore and dispatched Hishan Singh Munshi, Mehar Singh Lamba, and Fateh Singh Kalianwala to bring Jodh Singh to him for a meeting. However, Jodh Singh would not easily agree to such a meeting and demanded that two conditions for such a meeting: 1) Batala, Kalanaur, Bajwara, and Sangowal to be restored to the Ramgarhias, and 2) Gurdit Singh Bhangi be granted a jagir. Maharaja Ranjit Singh agreed to both of the requests. The two met at Amritsar in the Golden Temple. Mai Sukhan and Gurdit Singh were given a jagir for their well-being and substinence.

He further assisted the Maharaja of the Sikhs in 1807 when Ranjit Singh led a month-long expedition against Qutb ud-Din of Kasur. For this help, the Maharaja blessed the Ramgarhia ruler with an elephant. Jodh Singh later helped the Maharaja in his expedition against Multan.

Many jagir grants were granted to Jodh Singh by the Maharaja, including the pargana of Ghuman with an annum income of 25,000 rupees from it and eleven villages from the pargana of Sikhowala or Sheikhupura which gave an annum income of 12,000 rupees.

In 1808, Ranjit Singh absorbed the territory that belonged to the Ramgarhia Misl and the misl's existence as an independent entity ceased. Ample pensions were provided to the deposed Ramgarhia ruler Jodh Singh and his cousin, Divan Singh.

=== After absorption by the Sikh Empire ===
Jodh Singh had a close friendship with Ranjit Singh of the Sukerchakia Misl. Ranjit Singh had once announced a bond of friendship between him and Jodh Singh in the presence of the Guru Granth Sahib at the Golden Temple in Amritsar. The Sukerchakia chief and later Sikh emperor referred to Jodh Singh as "Babaji" and Jodh Singh was always seated beside Ranjit Singh when the latter held durbar (court).

Between 1810–11, Jodh Singh, assisted by Diwan Mokham Chand, annexed the lands that had been under the control of the Faizalpuria Misl.

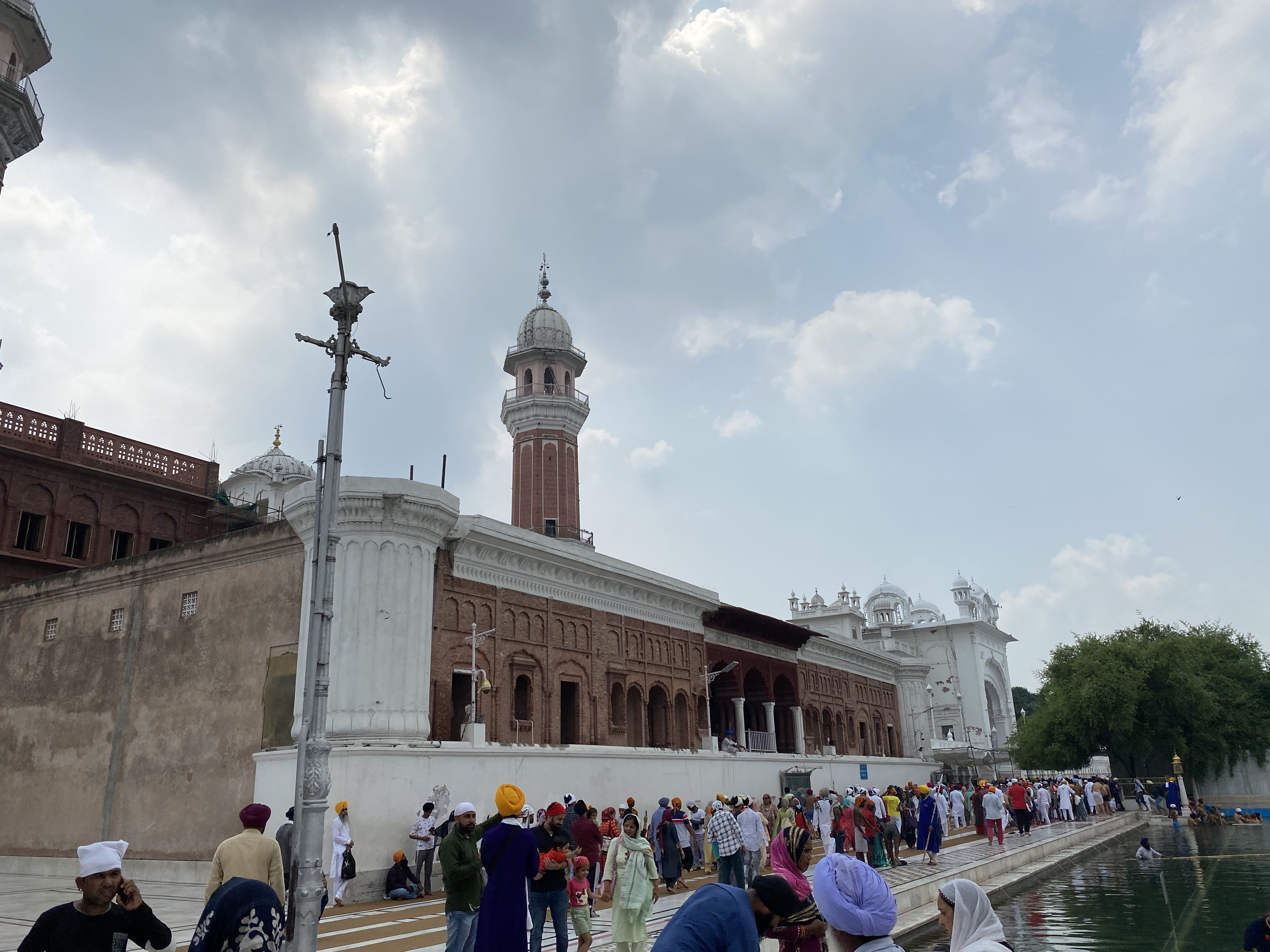
Ramgarhia Bunga

During the tenure of Jodh Singh, architectural works, such as the Ramgarhia Bunga, were constructed. He also donated materials for the beautification renovations of the Golden Temple complex, including perforated marble and mosaics. He was also responsible for constructing the first two stories of the tower of Gurdwara Baba Atal Rai. Jodh Singh died in Amritsar in August 1815.

After the death of Jodh Singh, the Ramgarhia familial successors, Divan Singh (son of Tara Singh), Vir Singh (brother of Jodh Singh), and Jodh Singh's widowed wife, began bickering with each-other over land claimants and eventually Maharaja Ranjit Singh had to intervene. Ranjit Singh further conquered Ramgarh Fort and demolished all of the Ramgarhia-associated forts, perhaps as many as 150 forts were destroyed.

Some of the Ramgarhia descendents, such as Mangal Singh Ramgarhia, served in high positions at the Sikh Empire's court and wielded strong influence in its affairs.

== Territory ==
The misl originated from Guga and Sur Singh, both located near Amritsar. The Ramgarhias held territory in the Upper Jalandhar Doab and parts of Malwa. The Ramgarhia Misl controlled areas towards the hills between the Ahluwalia and Dallewalia misls.

== Legacy ==
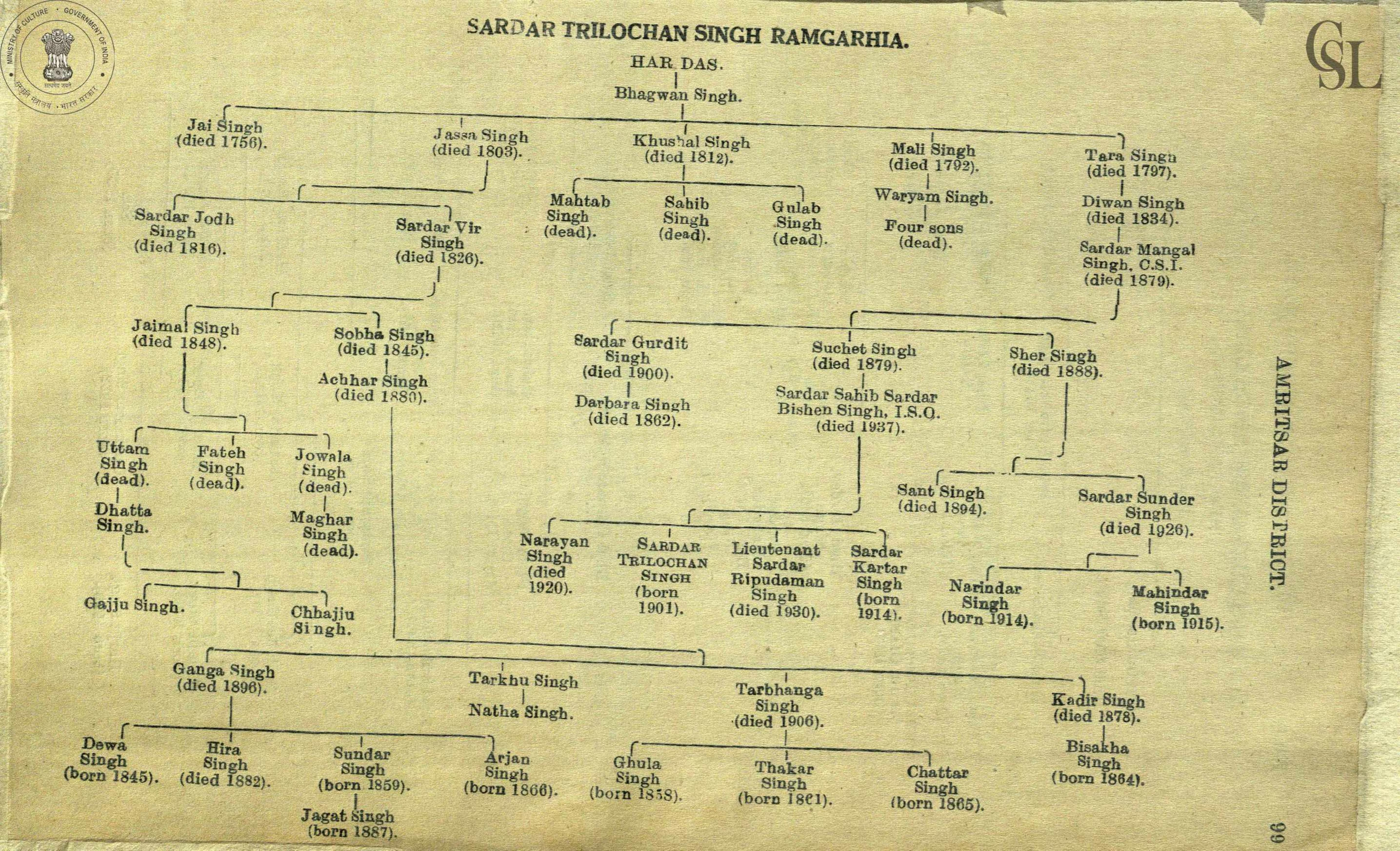
Genealogical pedigree (family-tree) of the Ramgarhia family of Amritsar district, Punjab, revised pedigree-table (1940)

The headquarters of Ramgarhia misl (Quila Ramgarh) has already lost its very existence and its location is adjacent to Gurudwara Sri Ramsar Sahib and Guru Ramdas Khalsa Senior Secondary School on Ramsar Road, Amritsar.

== Leaders ==
No.	Name (Birth–Death)	Portrait	Reign	Ref.
As a Jatha:
1.	Khushal Singh			
2.	Nand Singh		? – circa 1743	
3.	Jassa Singh Ramgarhia (1723 – 20 April 1803)		Circa 1743 – 1748	
As an independent Misl:
–	Jassa Singh Ramgarhia (1723 – 20 April 1803)		1748 – 1803	
4.	Jodh Singh Ramgarhia (died August 1815)		1803 – 1808	

== Gallery ==
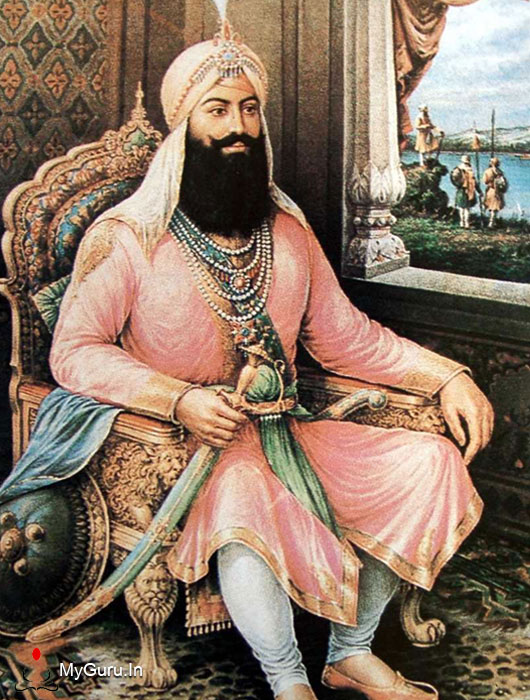
Sardar Jassa Singh Ramgharia, 20th century painting

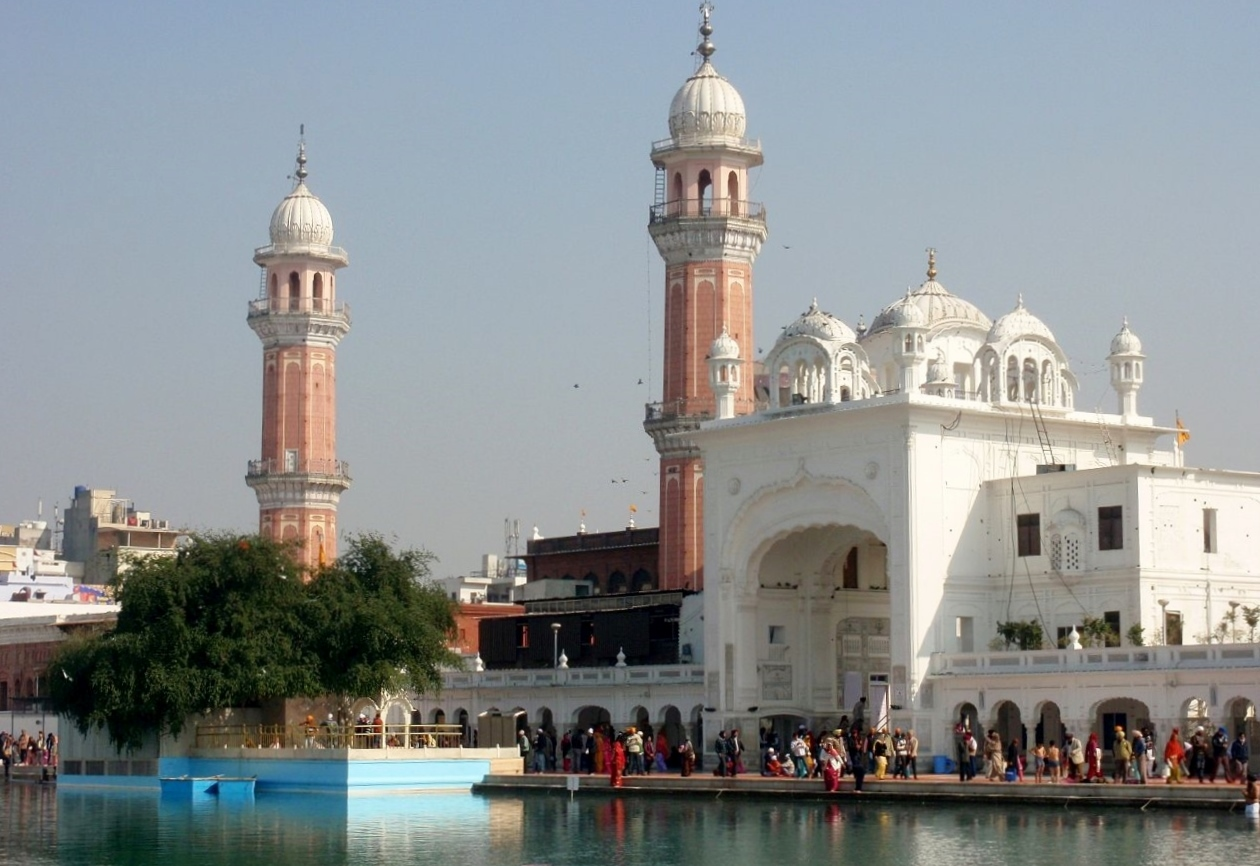
Ramgarhia Bunga

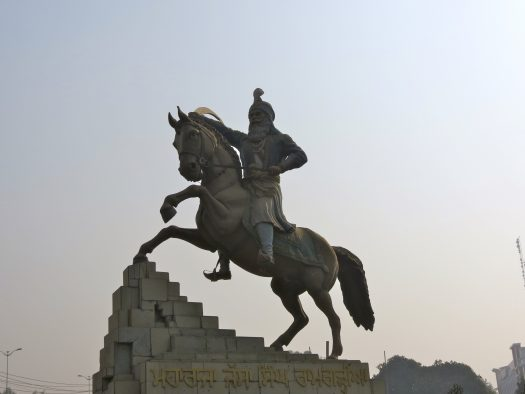
An equestrian statue of Sardar Jassa Singh Ramgarhia

== See also ==
- Ramgarhia Bunga
- Golden Temple
