= Ramgarhia Bunga =

Three-storied building situated at entrance of the Golden Temple complex

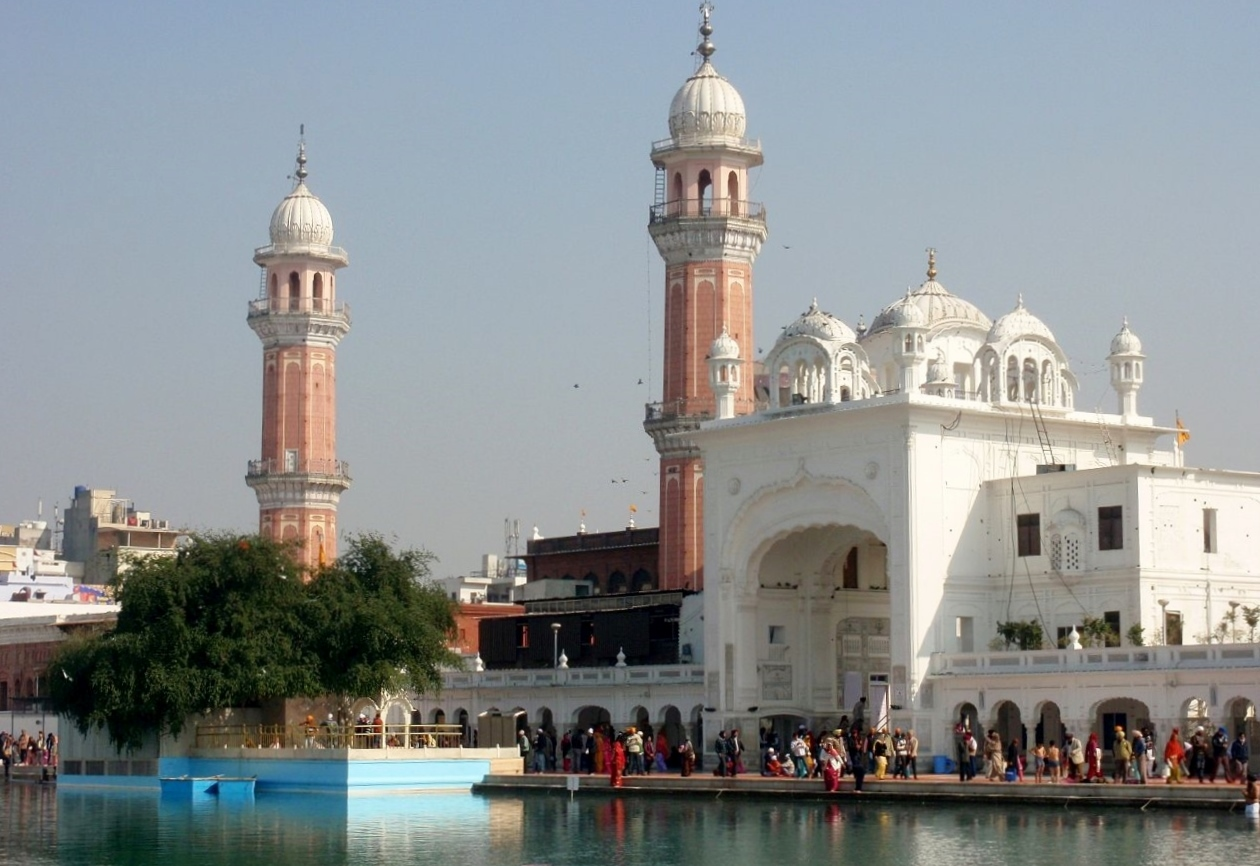
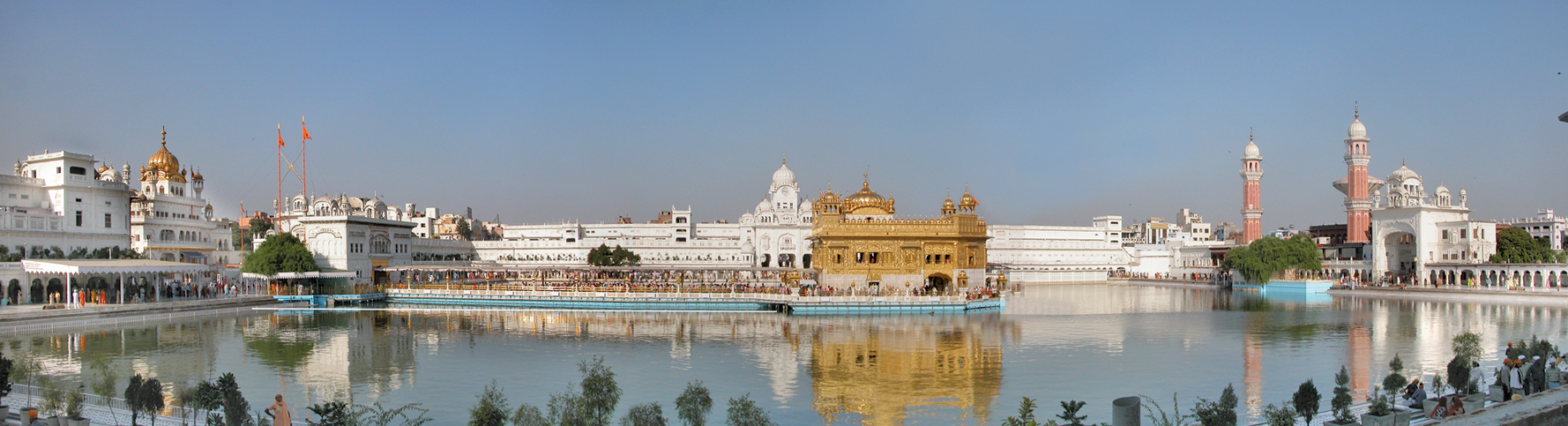
Twin towers of Ramgarhia Bunga, located behind the Golden Temple on opposite side of Akal Takht. Designed like a minaret, they are an 18th-century Sikh watchtowers to detect and defend against Afghan Islamic army attacks.

Ramgarhia Bunga is the three-storeyed red stone watchtowers complex located near southeastern edge of the Golden Temple, Amritsar. The two minaret-style Ramgarhia Bunga high towers are visible from the parikrama (circumambulation) walkway around the Harmandir Sahib Sarovar (water tank). It is a pre-Ranjit Singh structure built by Sikh warrior and Ramgarhia misl chief Jassa Singh Ramgarhia in late 18th-century, after the 1762 destruction and desecration of the Sikh holy temple and site by the Afghan Muslim forces led by Ahmed Shah Abdali. The Bunga watchtowers-related infrastructure was constructed to station sentinels to watch for any surprise attack, house soldiers to help fortify the area, and to protect the holy complex from desecration.

The Ramgarhia Bunga houses the granite slab of Takht-e-Taus from the Red Fort on which, according to the oral tradition, all the Mughal emperors were crowned in Delhi. This slab was seized by Sikhs from Delhi, during an attack against the Mughal armies, and brought back to Amritsar as a symbol that the Mughal Empire will end with the removal of their coronation stone.

== History ==
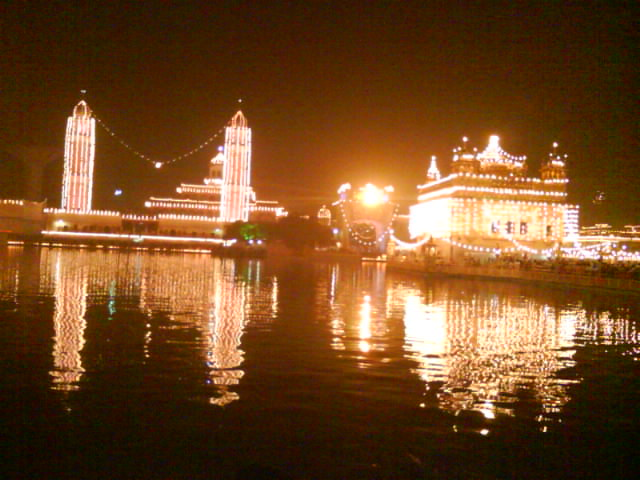
Ramgarhia Bunga and Golden Temple illuminated on Guru Nanak Dev Gurpurab

During the reign of the Muslim Mughal Emperors, The Golden Temple was damaged many times, but each time it was rebuilt by the Sikhs. Sardars of the 12 Sikh Misls decided that some of the Khalsa leaders must be housed inside it for its protection against their enemies. According to Fenech and McLeod, during the 18th century, Sikh misl chiefs and rich communities built over 70 such Bungas of different shapes and forms around the Golden Temple to watch the area, house soldiers and defend the temple. Such Bungas were also built near major Sikh shrines elsewhere on the Indian subcontinent in the 18th-century. The Ramgarhia Bunga was originally constructed in 1755 by Jassa Singh Ramgarhia.

Ramgarhia misl chief Jassa Singh Ramgarhia had conquered territory as far afield as Delhi, where he removed the slab from the Takht-e-Taus on which the Mughal coronation ceremonies were held. He brought the slab to Amritsar and placed it in the Ramgarhia Bunga where it still lies.

In the 19th century, these served defensive purposes, provided accommodation for Sikh pilgrims and some served as centers of learning. Most of the Bungas were demolished during and after the British colonial era, often to improve the facilities for growing number of pilgrims in the 20th-century. The Ramgarhia Bunga is single surviving example of the Bunga-related historic infrastructure in Amritsar, along with Akal Takht which originally was built as the Akal Bunga on the other side of holy tank. The 1905 Kangra earthquake caused extensive damage to the complex, particularly by destroying the top domes of its two burj watchtowers, which were left unrepaired until 2010–11. The complex experienced heavy damage due to Operation Blue Star in 1984. In 2025, a twenty-year-old restoration project was completed.

== Architecture ==
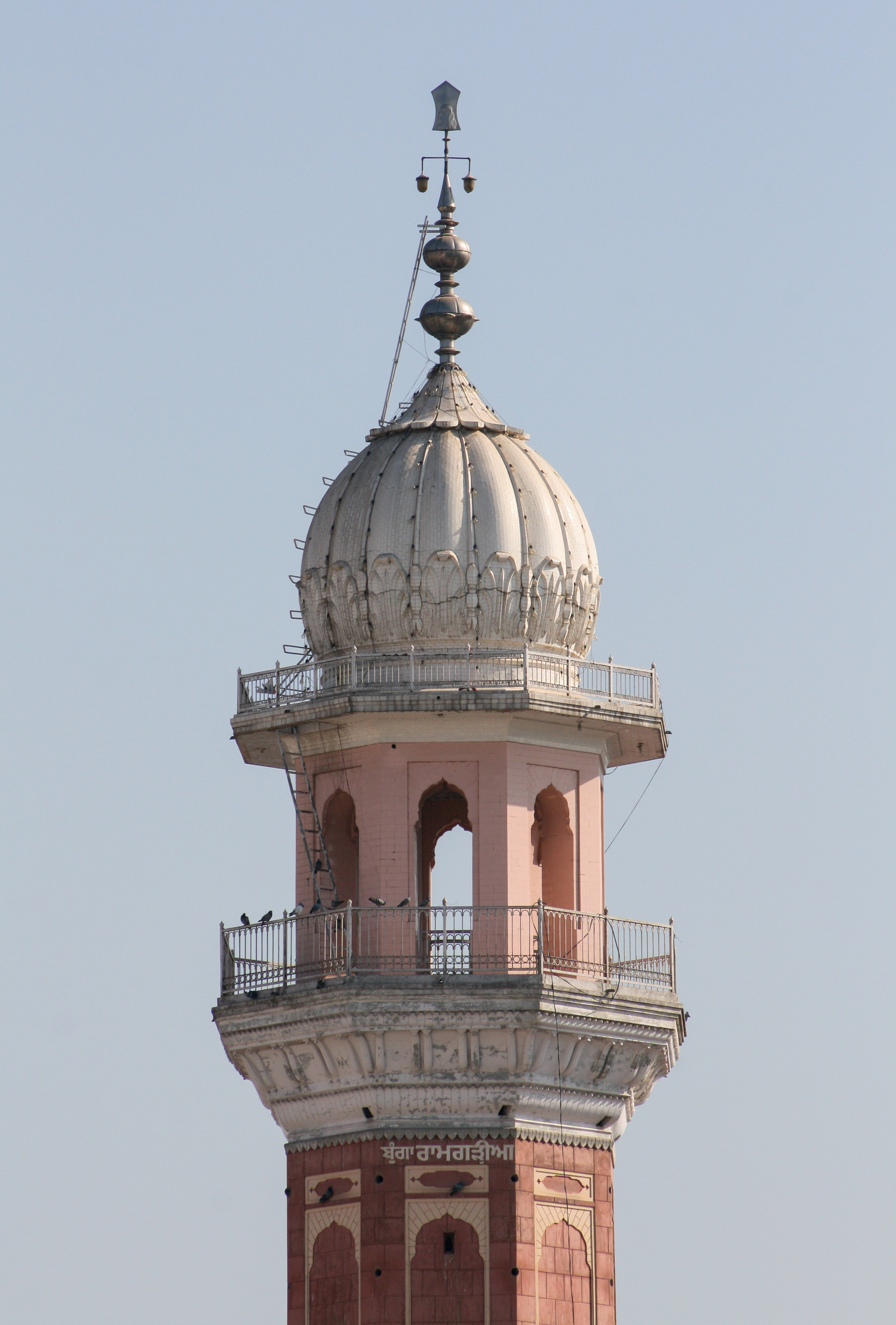
Rebuilt top dome of one of the two burj towers. The top domes were only repaired in 2001–02, almost a century after the original domes were destroyed in a 1905 earthquake.

Ramgarhia Bunga consists of three flat-roofed ranges, each of two principal storeys, arranged round three sides of a courtyard and is constructed almost of small burnt bricks (Nanakshahi) set in lime and mud mortar. The colonnade and the triple arches are of red sandstone. The undersides of the vaults and all the walls were finished internally and externally with lime plaster and lime wash, much of it decorative with arches. Lower levels are approached by two flights of steps, one from outside and the other from within the courtyard.

The rebuilt top domes of the two burj watchtowers do not resemble the originals due to the differences in material uses, with the original domes consisting of Nanakshahi bricks.

== Ramgarhia misl ==
Ramgarhia misl chief Jassa Singh Ramgarhia was a brave Sikh leader. He had redesigned a mud fortress Ram Rauni in 1748 about a mile from Golden Temple which was used to house and keep soldiers. The place was named so in honour of fourth Sikh Guru Shri Guru Ram Das Ji, who have founded the Amritsar city. The place was later known as Quila Ramgarh due to its fortification by Jassa Singh Ramgarhia. The Ramgarhia Misl derives its name from this place which literally means Custodians of the Castle of God. The Quila Ramgarh has already lost its very existence and its location is adjacent to Gurudwara Sri Ramsar Sahib and Guru Ramdas Khalsa Senior Secondary School on Ramsar Road, Amritsar.

Ramgarhia bunga remains a symbol of the Ramgarhia Sikh community's identity, their historic sacrifices and contribution to defending the Golden Temple over the centuries.

== Renovation ==
The original domes on the minarets were damaged and then removed in 1903 because of an earthquake. The minarets were again heavily damaged by Indian artillery fire during Operation Blue Star in 1984, but later renovated by the Shiromani Gurdwara Parbandhak Committee and the Ramgarhia Society Sardar Jassa Singh Ramgarhia Federation. Later, some Babas of Kar Sewawale had done colossal damage to the heritage site by converting a portion into their abode. There are also plans to convert basement of bunga to Sikh museum.

== See also ==
- Golden Temple
- Jallianwala Bagh

== Photo gallery ==
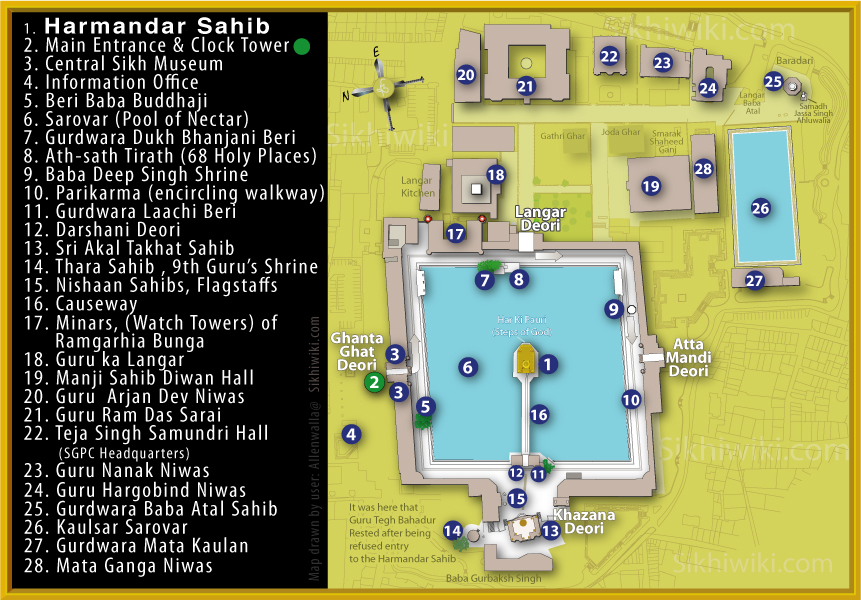
Location of bunga in Darbar sahib complex (no. 17)

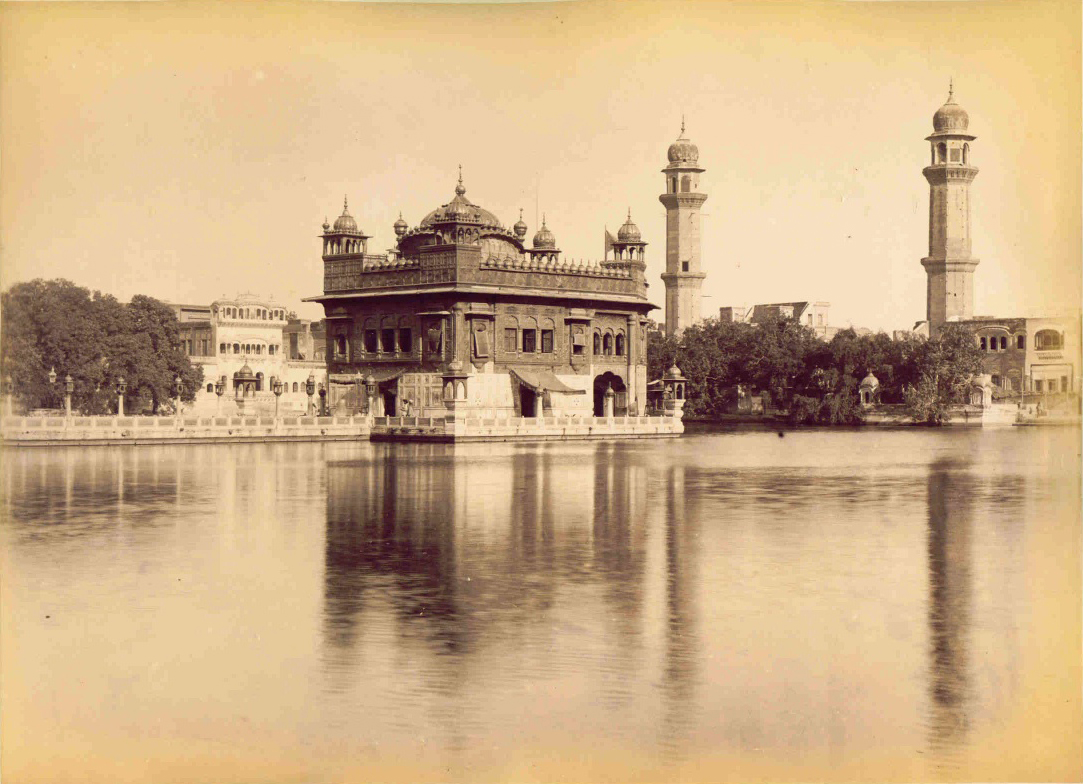
Golden Temple in year 1880

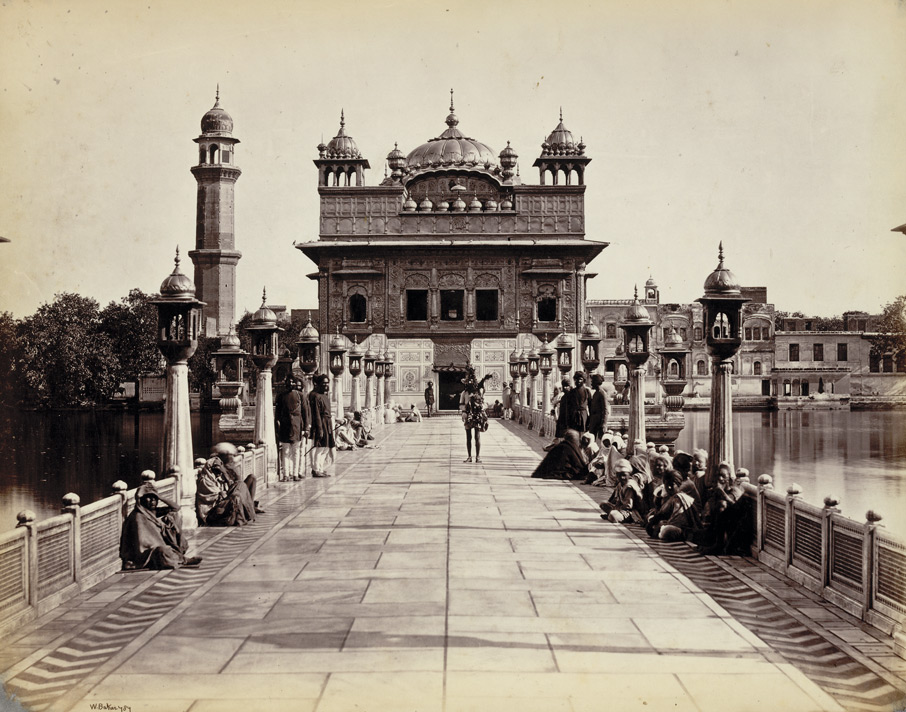
Bunga visible behind Golden Temple in 1870

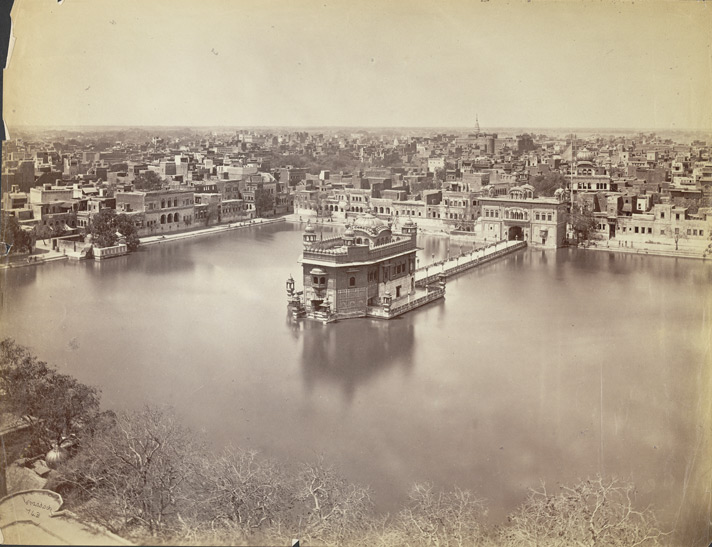
Golden temple view from Ramgarhia bunga

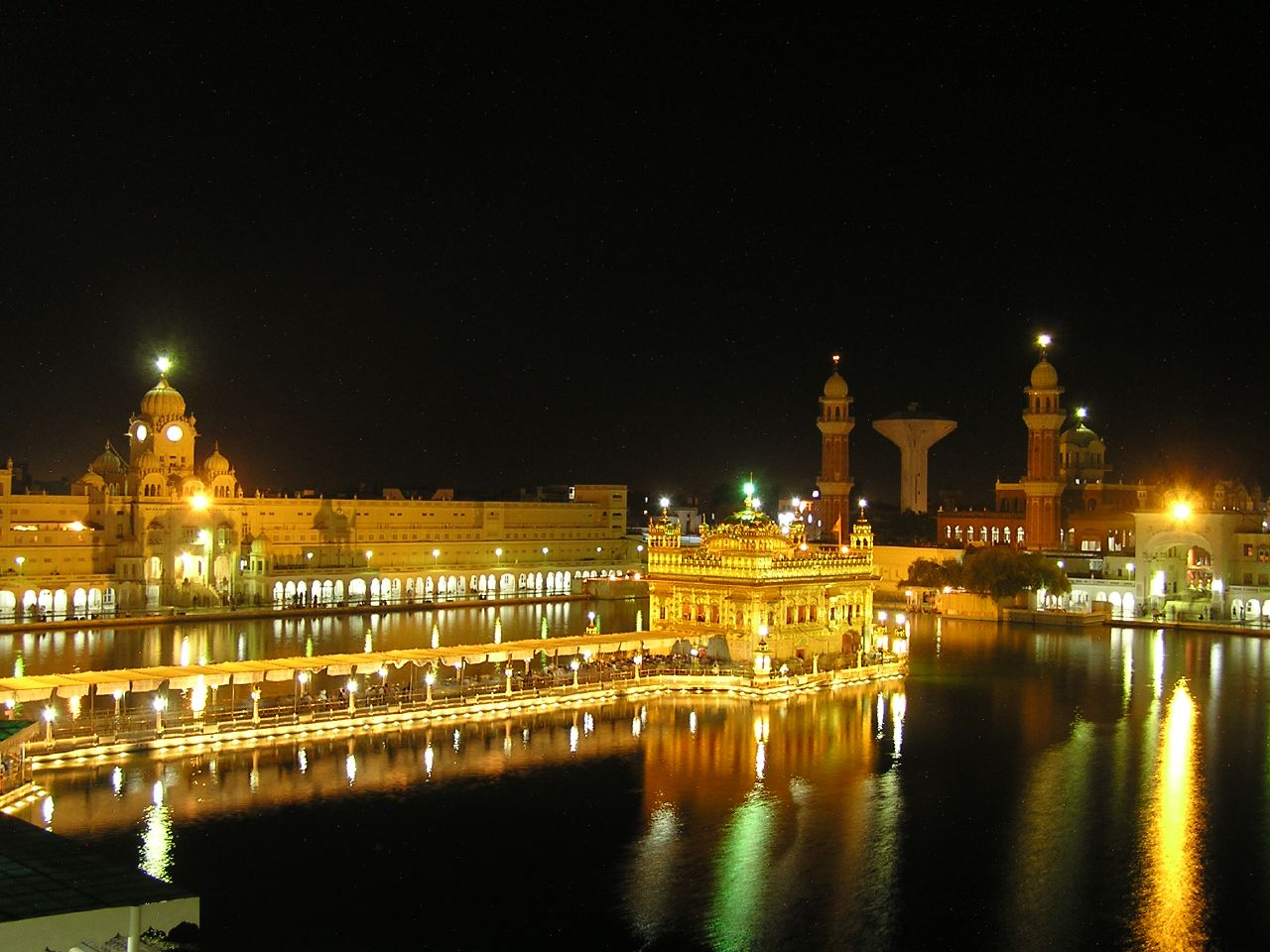
Darbar Sahib night view

Slab of Mughal throne placed in Bunga

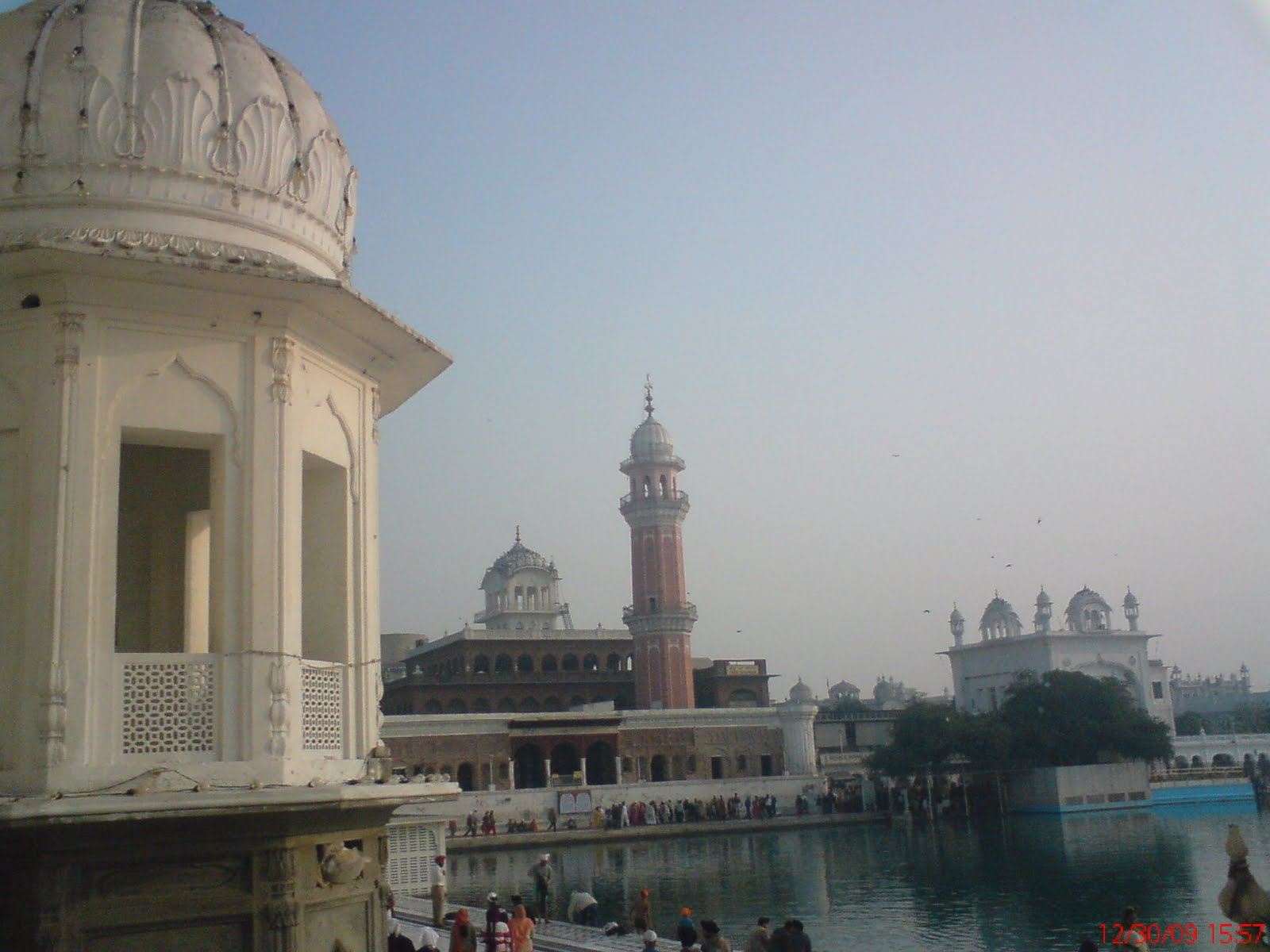
Bunga as seen from main entrance of Golden Temple

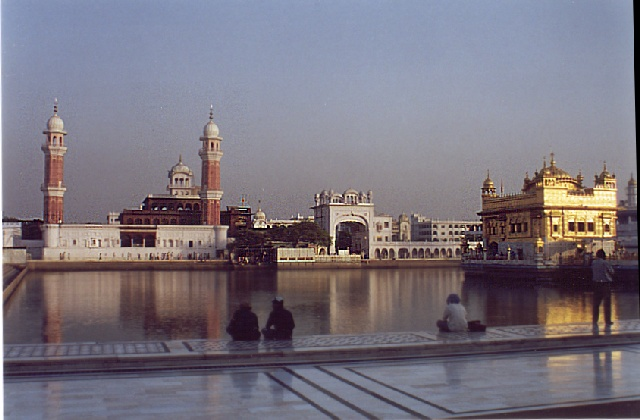

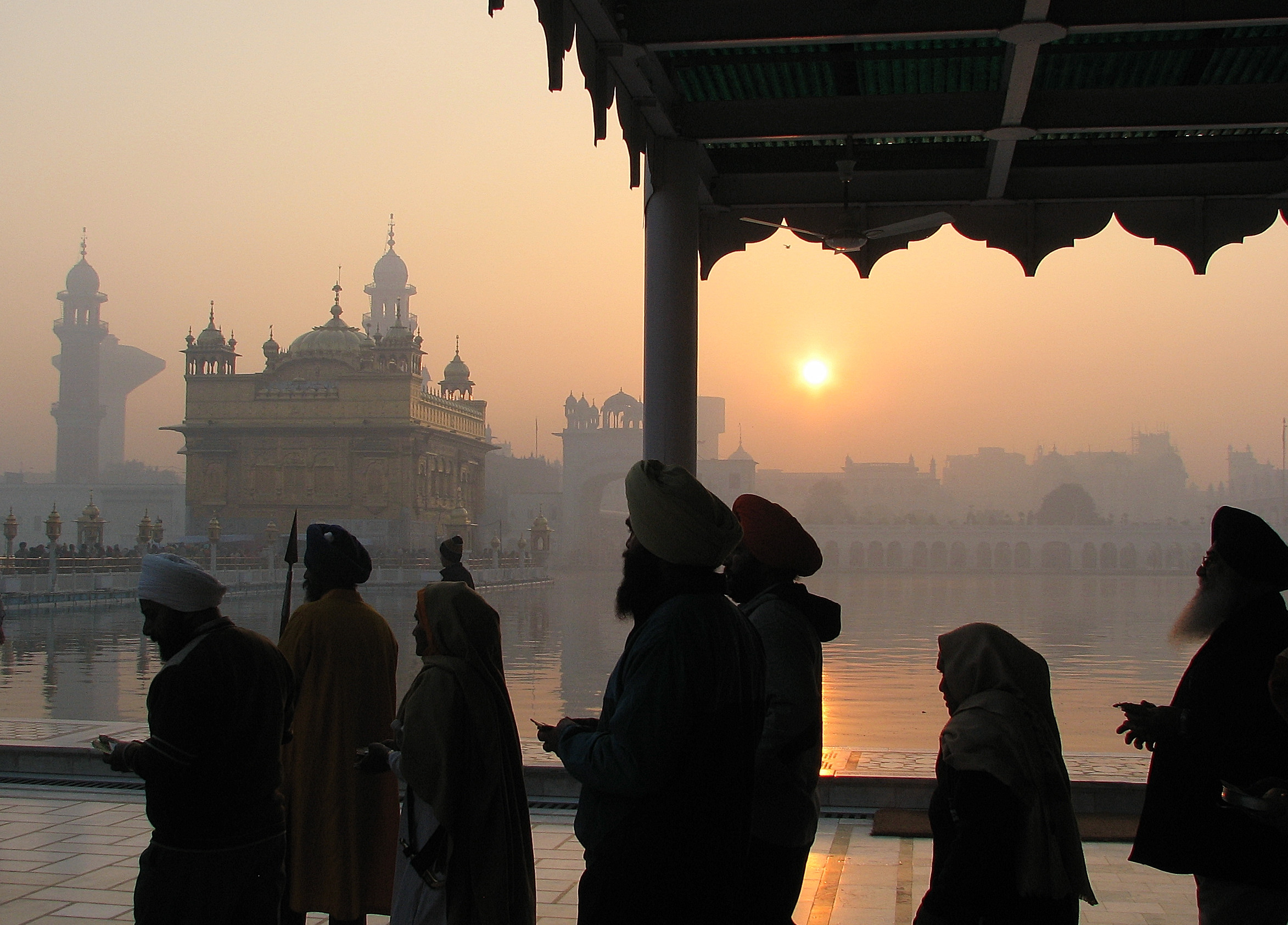

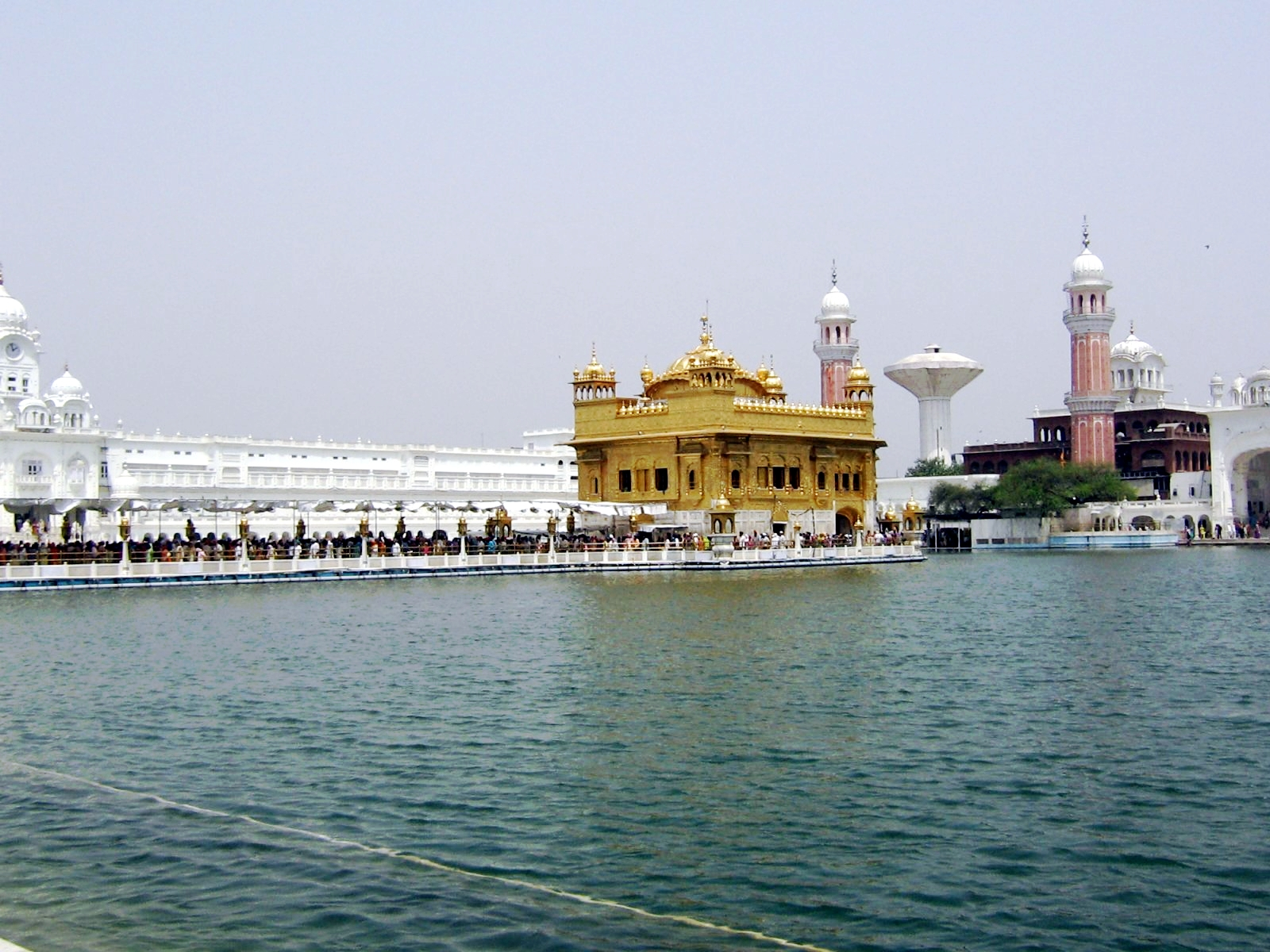

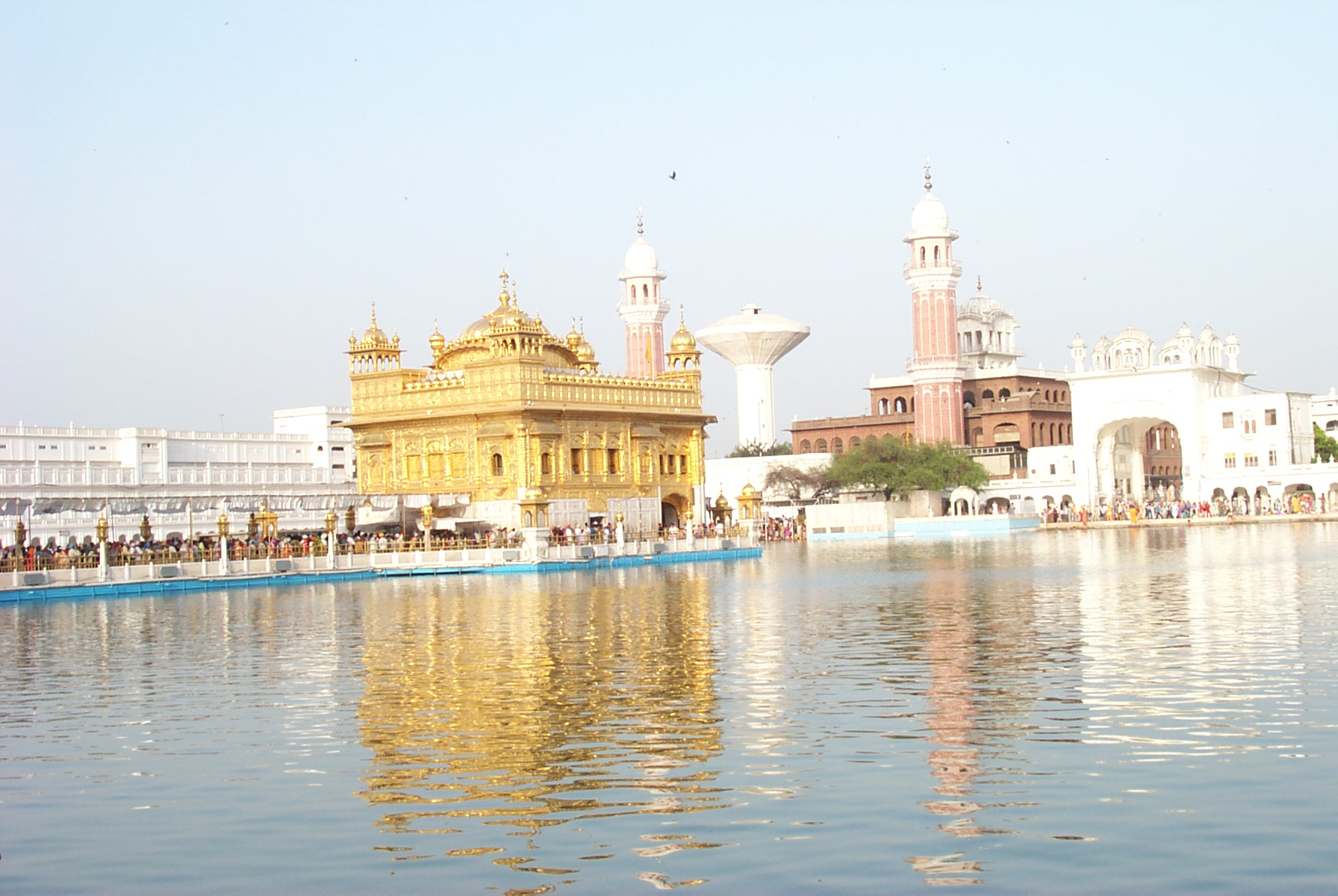

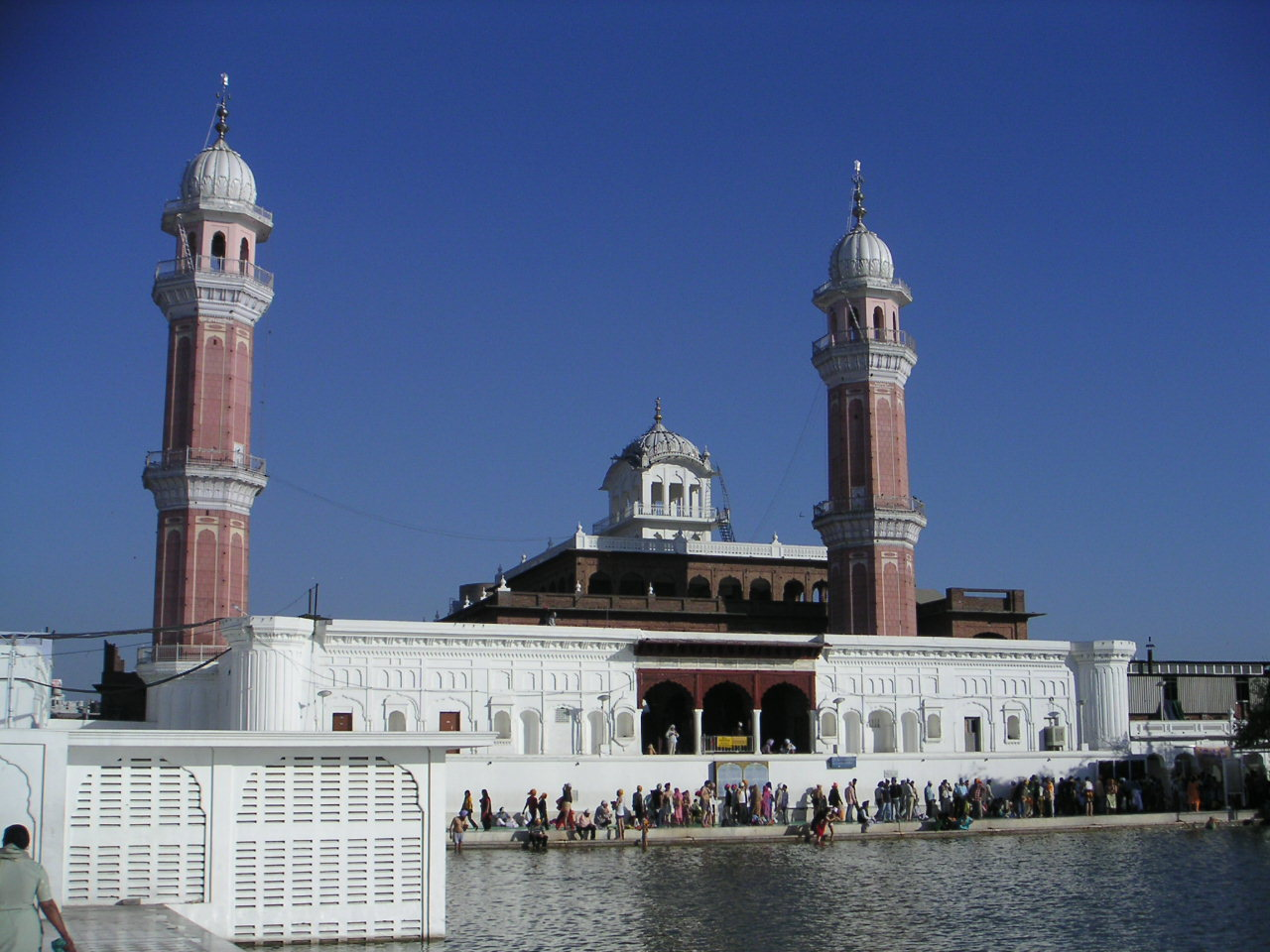

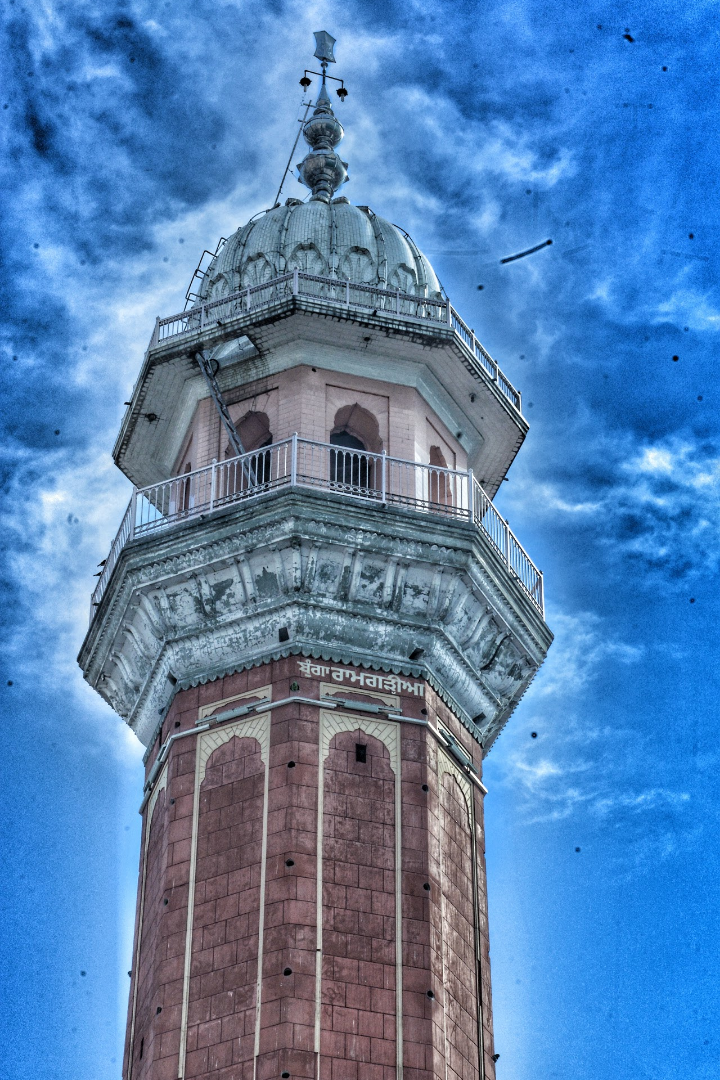

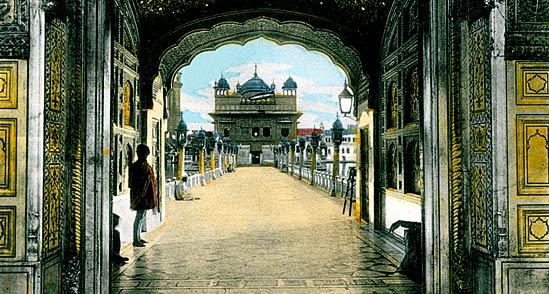

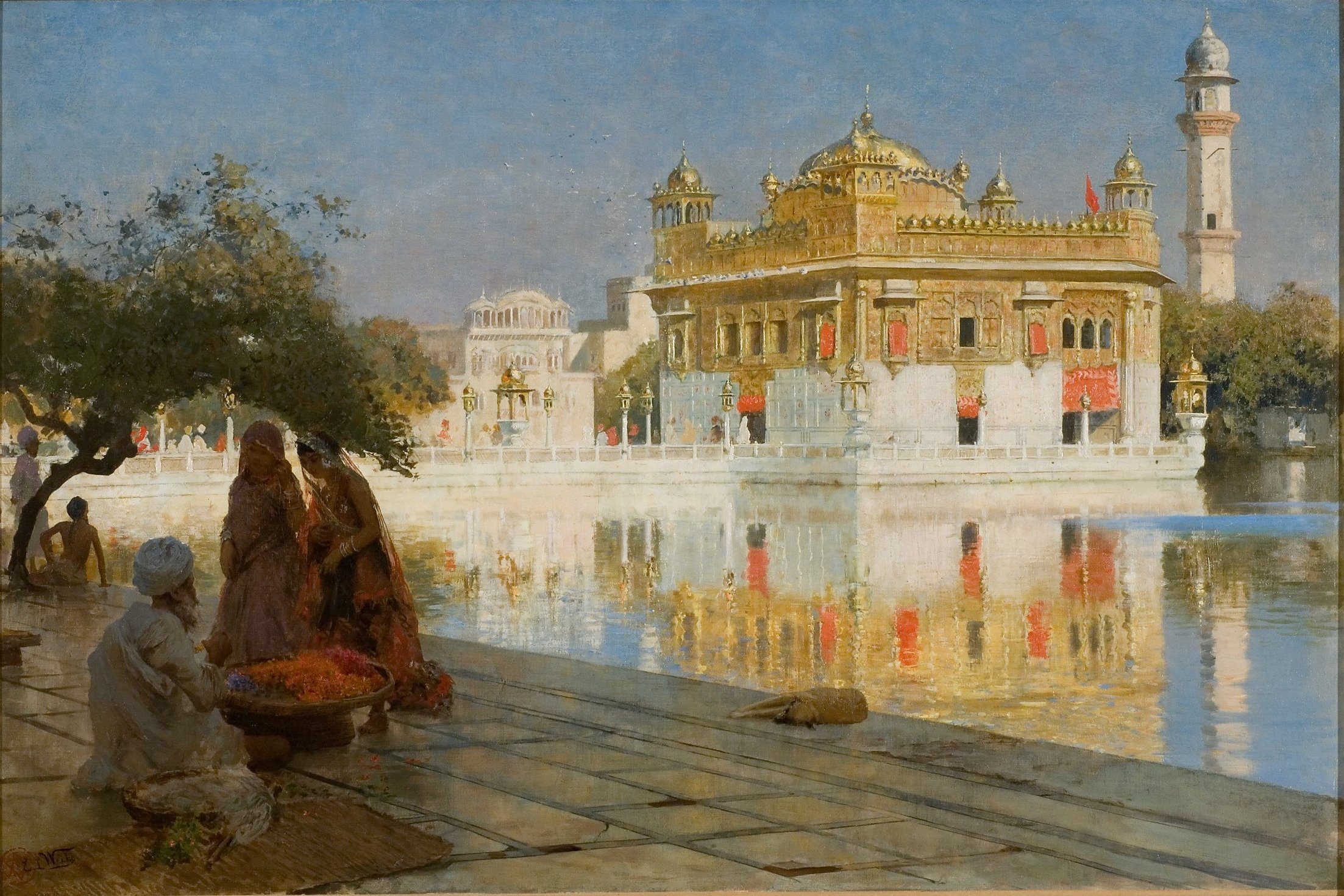

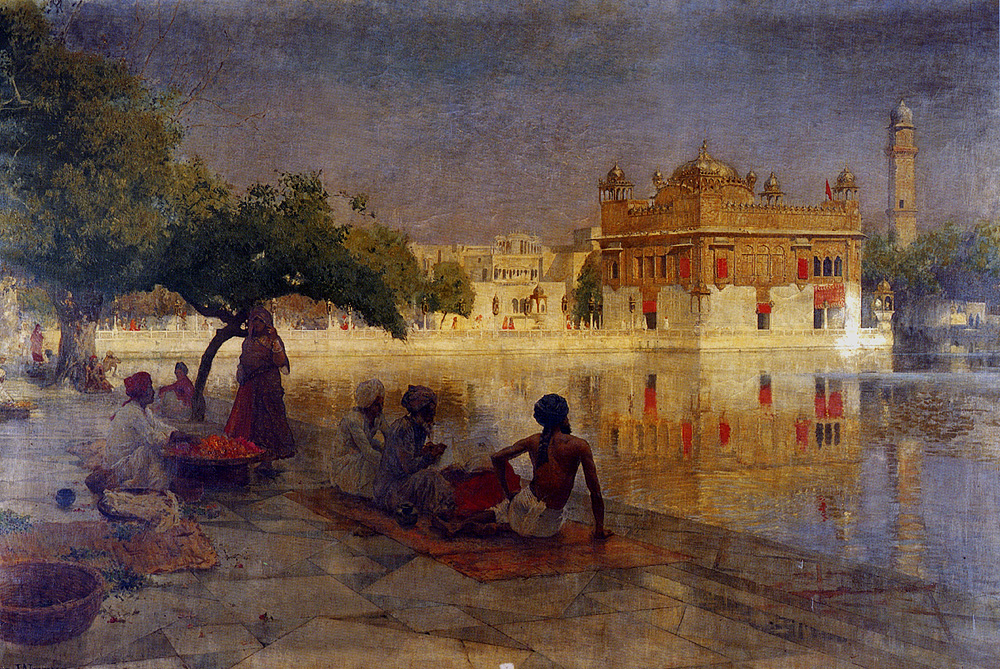

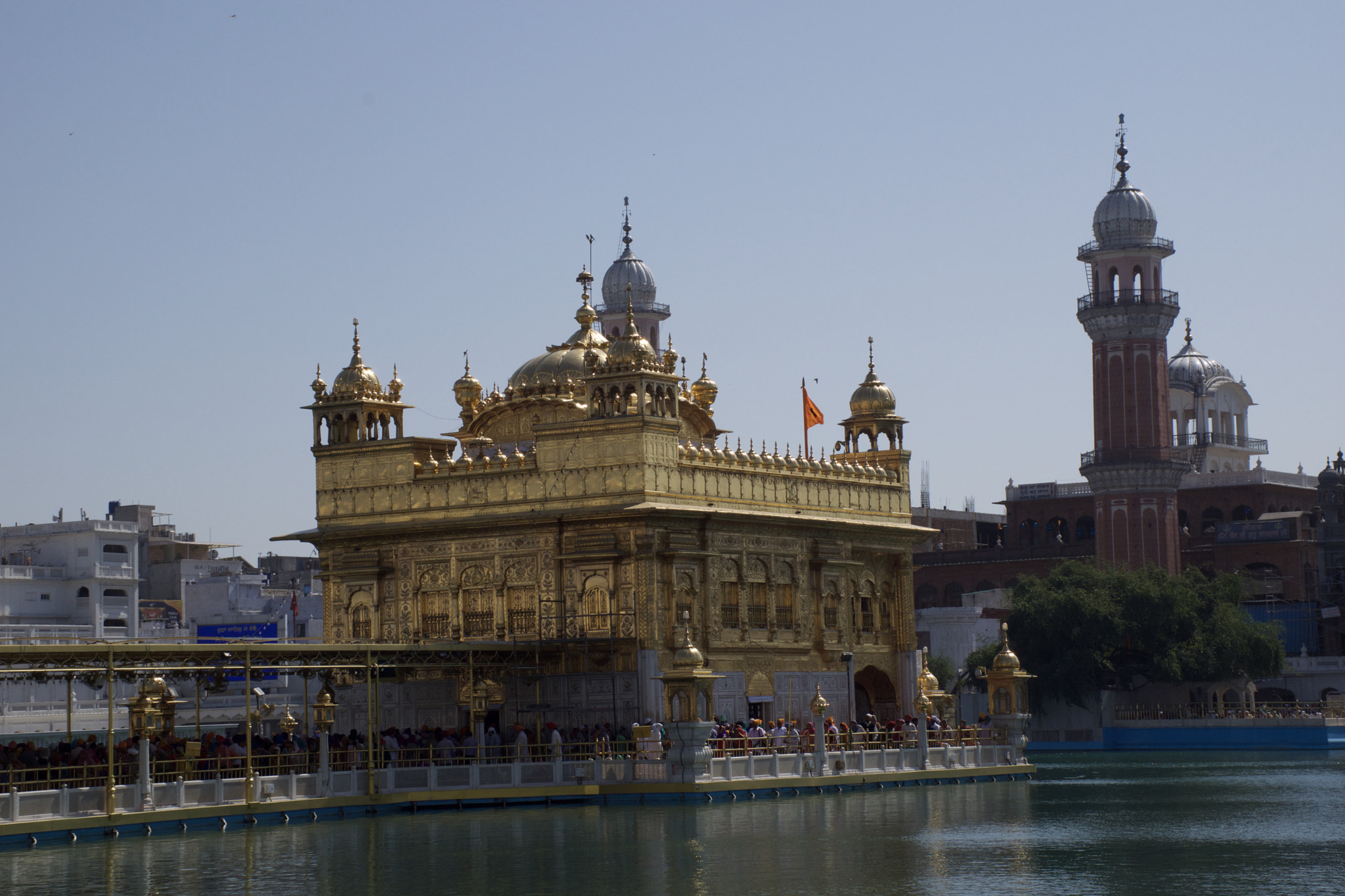

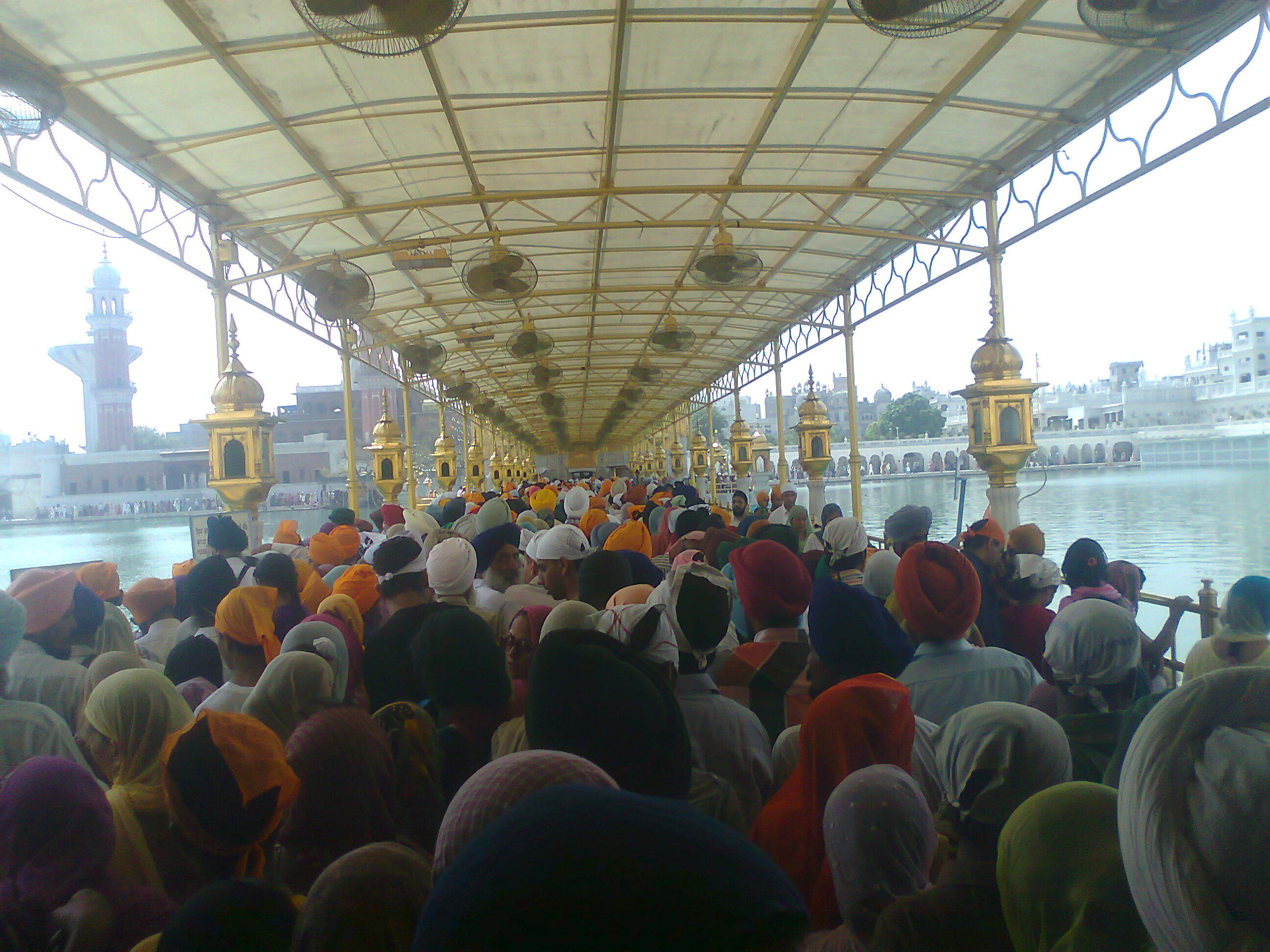

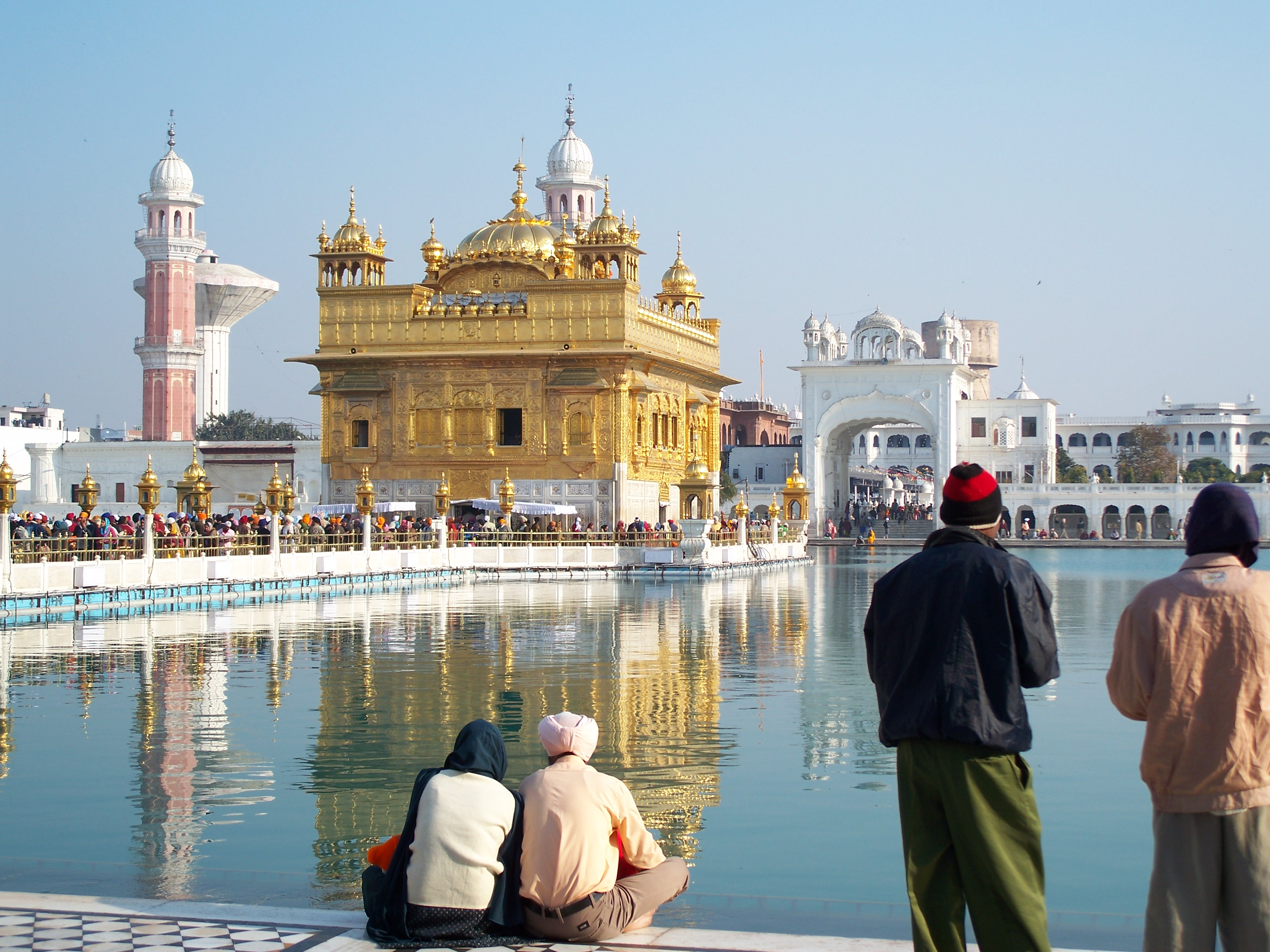

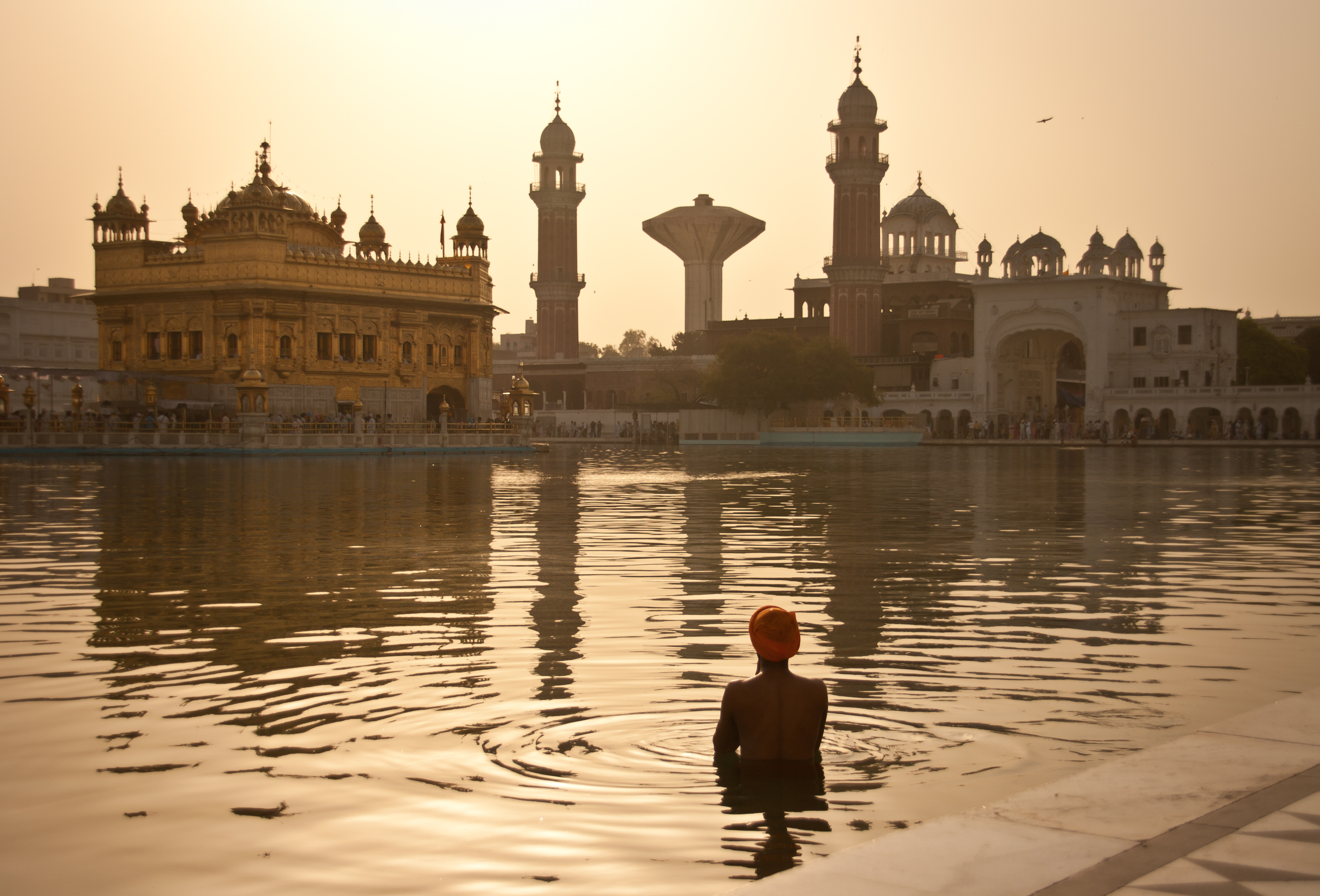

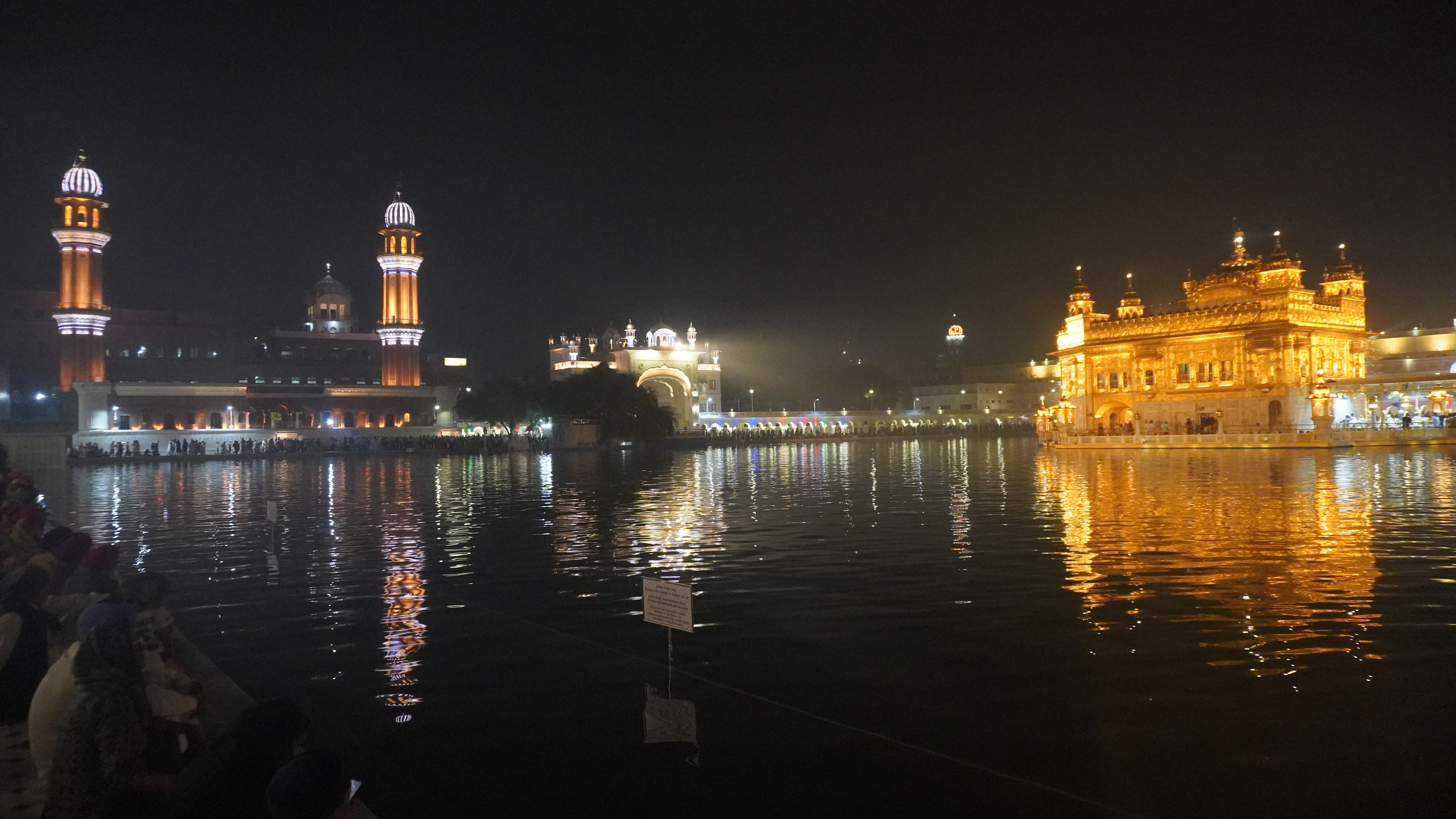
Night view of Bunga in Golden Temple complex.
