= Mai Sukhan =

- Died: 1824
- Known for: Leader of the Bhangi Misl
- Spouse: Sardar Gulab Singh Dhillon

Mai Sukhan (died 1824), was an Majhail ruler of Misl. Mai Sukhan gained recognition in Punjab for her military leadership. Mai Sukhan was a powerful Sikh ruler of the Majha region, which gained her recognition throughout Punjab.

== Biography ==
She was the widow of the Sikh leader Sardar Gulab Singh Bhangi, a Dhillon Jatt of Panjwar village, who had died in 1800 at Bhasin village now in Lahore District. The rulers of the Misl were the Jatts of Dhillon Clan who had ruled from mid 1750s to 1805.

She ruled as regent for her minor son Gurdit Singh. In 1805, when the forces of the Lahore-based Sikh emperor Ranjit Singh were in the midst of the conquest of the holy city of Amritsar, the Sikh band of defenders under the command of Mai Sukhan Dhillon held them off for a considerable period. When requested to surrender the gun Zamzama by Ranjit Singh, Mai Sukhan sealed the city and prepared to defend it. The emperor afterwards recognized her bravery by giving her five or six villages.

She had a son named Gurdit Singh Dhillon, aged ten when his father Gulab Singh died. She died in 1824.
