= Chaudhry Abdul Hameed Khan =

Bureaucrat

Chaudhry Abdul Hameed Khan چوہدری عبدالحمید خان
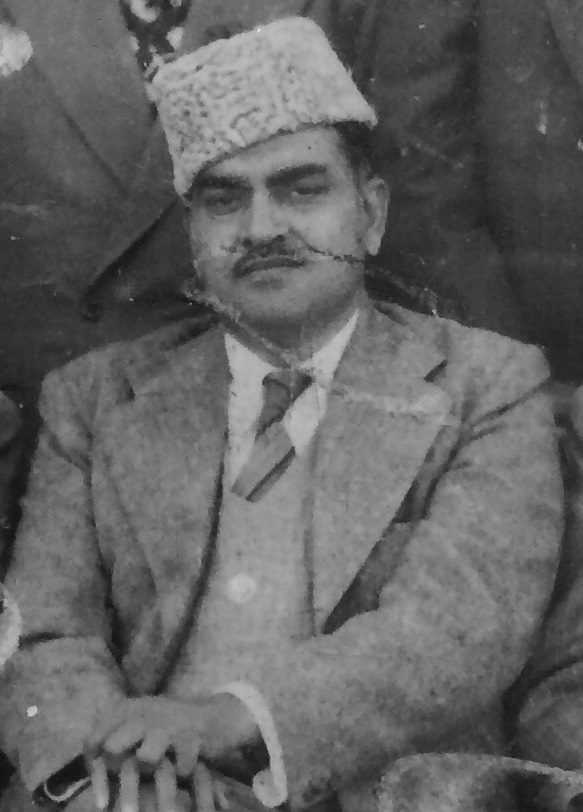

Assistant Commissioner
- In office 18 March 1930 – 23 April 1934
- Nominated by: Geoffrey Fitzhervey de Montmorency

Deputy Commissioner Jhang
- In office December 1949 – January 1952

Deputy Commissioner Sargodha

Rehabilitation Commissioner Of West Pakistan

Home Secretary of West Pakistan

Personal details
- Born: 1906 Rahon Jullundur, British India
- Died: 1958 (aged 51–52) Lahore, Pakistan
- Resting place: Model Town, Lahore
- Citizenship: (British Raj) British India (1906–1947); Pakistan (1947–1958)
- Education: Ma English LLM
- Alma mater: Aligarh Muslim University
- Occupation: Bureaucrat

Chaudhry Abdul Hameed Khan E. A. C.

Chaudhary Abdul Hameed Khan (1906 – 1958) (Urdu: چوہدری عبدالحمید خان ) was in British Indian civil service

== Early life ==
Chaudhry Abdul Hameed Khan, born in Jullundur in 1906, emerged from the distinguished lineage of the Ghorewaha Rajput family in Rahon, within the Jullundur District. The historical significance of his family is recorded in the Official Jullundur District Gazetteer.

The foundations of Chaudhry Abdul Hameed Khan’s educational journey were laid in Jullundur, where he received his early education. His commitment to academic excellence led him to Aligarh Muslim University, a renowned institution, where he achieved a master’s degree in English and an LLM (Master of Laws) in 1926.

== Family ==
Siblings and Brother-in-Law: Abdul Hameed Khan, a distinguished figure, had three brothers, each contributing significantly to their community:

• Rai Muhammad Ali: Bestowed with the title of Rai by the British government, he played a pivotal role in the Rahon Jagir (estate).

• Chaudhry M Sadeeq: A dedicated public servant, he served in the Government Service as Tehsildar of Ludhiana.

• Chaudhry M Latif: Known for his role as the Lambardar of Rahon.

His brothers-in-law, Chaudhry M Sharif (Tehsil President Rahon, 1945-1947) and Feroze Khan, were notable personalities. Feroze Khan’s sons, Farouk Rana, who became the Pakistan Ambassador to Canada, and Rana Iftiqar, a Brigadier in the Pakistan Army, continued the family’s tradition of service and excellence.

Abdul Hameed Khan’s marriage to the daughter of Chaudhary Jang Baz Khan Rana of Rahon fortified the family’s influence.

Another notable family member, Chaudhry M Ishaq, received the Afghan War Medal in 1919. His noteworthy service continued as he assumed the role of Assistant Commissioner in 1929. His father, Chaudhry Ghulam Murtaza, served as the Lambardar of Udhowal.

After the partition, Abdul Hameed Khan’s son, Chaudhry Abdul Waheed, carried forward the family’s commitment to public service, serving as the District Chairman in Sheikhpura. The family’s dedication to community welfare and public service extended through generations with individuals like Chaudhry Abdul Qadir and Chaudhry Moin ud Din Ahmad, contributing to the socio-political landscape. His son, Chaudhary Abbas Hameed Khan, is a political figure active in the local politics of Khanqah Dogran and Safdarabad in Sheikhupura District, Punjab, Pakistan, where he participates in community leadership and public affairs.

== Civil Service ==
He joined Punjab civil secretariat by the order of then Governor of Punjab Geoffrey Fitzhervey de Montmorency. He was appointed as Assistant Commissioner. He was ADM Muzaffargarh Ferozepur Montgomery and Karnal. He served as Deputy commissioner Sargodha and Jhang (Dec 1949- Jan 1952) later becoming Rehabilitation Commissioner of West Pakistan and then appointed as Home Secretary West Pakistan. He was an important Bureaucrat and Statesman as mentioned by Qudrat Ullah Shahab in Shahab Nama. He died while in service in 1958.
