= Federal Drought Emergency Relief Assistance =

Unit of the Planning Commission, Pakistan

The Federal Drought Emergency Relief Assistance is a unit of Planning Commission under Ministry of Planning and Development to facilitate the implementation of the project in the drought-hit areas of all the provinces and territories and coordinate activities carried out in the provinces to mitigate the effects of drought.

Drought Emergency Relief Assistance program was launched in November, 2001 to mitigate the negative impact of the drought; to revive the economy and promote more sustainable use of available water and other productive resources. Under the program the main focus remained on improvement and management of available resources.

The programme supports the government strategy to revive the agrarian economy, buildup infrastructure, manage and promote more sustainable use of locally available water and other productive resources. The main objectives of the DERA programme are as under:

- To support the Government efforts to mitigate the effects of drought in most adversely affected areas/regions.
- To implement water conservation measures.
- Supporting infrastructure and services to restore agricultural growth.

Assistance of $100 million and $40 million was provided by the Asian Development Bank and the World Bank (WB) respectively whereas the Government of Pakistan earmarked $20 million, making a total of $160 million equivalent to PKR 10 billion.

== See also ==
- National Disaster Management Authority (Pakistan)
