= Chakli Shujat =

- Village
- Location in Punjab, India Chakli Shujat (India)
- Coordinates: 31.0218531°N 76.1903786°E
- Country: India
- State: Punjab
- District: Shaheed Bhagat Singh Nagar

Government
  - Type: Panchayat raj
  - Body: Gram panchayat
- Elevation: 251 m (823 ft)

Population (2011)
  - Total: 602
- Sex ratio 313/289 ♂/♀

Languages
  - Official: Punjabi
- Time zone: UTC+5:30 (IST)
- PIN: 144515
- Telephone code: 01823
- ISO 3166 code: IN-PB
- Post office: Usmanpur
- Website: nawanshahr.nic.in

Chakli Shujat is a village in Shaheed Bhagat Singh Nagar district of Punjab State, India. It is located 9 kilometres (5.6 mi) away from Rahon, 17 kilometres (11 mi) from Nawanshahr, 21 kilometres (13 mi) from district headquarter Shaheed Bhagat Singh Nagar and 87 kilometres (54 mi) from state capital Chandigarh. The village is administrated by Sarpanch an elected representative of the village. The current village's sarpanch is Mr.Mohinder Pal from scheduled caste community.

== Demography ==
As of 2011, Chakli Shujat has a total number of 127 houses and population of 602 of which 313 include are males while 289 are females according to the report published by Census India in 2011. The literacy rate of Chakli Shujat is 74.40%, higher than the state average of 75.84%. The population of children under the age of 6 years is 59 which is 9.80% of total population of Chakli Shujat, and child sex ratio is approximately 735 as compared to Punjab state average of 846.

Most of the people are from Schedule Caste which constitutes 66.11% of total population in Chakli Shujat. The town does not have any Schedule Tribe population so far. Other people belong from Jatt Sikh and Sansi caste, some peoples also belong from obc category.

As per the report published by Census India in 2011, 234 people were engaged in work activities out of the total population of Chakli Shujat which includes 155 males and 79 females. According to census survey report 2011, 85.90% workers describe their work as main work and 14.10% workers are involved in Marginal activity providing livelihood for less than 6 months.

== Education ==
The village has a Punjabi medium, co-ed upper primary school founded in 1996. The schools provide mid-day meal as per Indian Midday Meal Scheme and the meal prepared in school premises. As per Right of Children to Free and Compulsory Education Act the school provide free education to children between the ages of 6 and 14.

KC Engineering College and Doaba Khalsa Trust Group Of Institutions are the nearest colleges. Industrial Training Institute for women (ITI Nawanshahr) is 5 kilometres (3.1 mi) away from the village. Lovely Professional University is 61 kilometres (38 mi) away from the village.

== Transport ==
Nawanshahr railway station is the nearest train station however, Garhshankar Junction railway station is 29 kilometres (18 mi) away from the village. Sahnewal Airport is the nearest domestic airport which located 46 kilometres (29 mi) away in Ludhiana and the nearest international airport is located in Chandigarh also Sri Guru Ram Dass Jee International Airport is the second nearest airport which is 170 kilometres (110 mi) away in Amritsar.

== See also ==
Satnam Satta, a local folk singer belong from this village. He do his shows in Jagratas and Religious fairs.
