= Daryapur, SBS Nagar =

Daryapur
- Village
- Location in Punjab, India Daryapur (India)
- Coordinates: 31.0224231°N 76.0827791°E
- Country: India
- State: Punjab
- District: Shaheed Bhagat Singh Nagar

Government
  - Type: Panchayat raj
  - Body: Gram panchayat
- Elevation: 254 m (833 ft)

Population (2011)
  - Total: 1,218
- Sex ratio 641/577 ♂/♀

Languages
  - Official: Punjabi
- Time zone: UTC+5:30 (IST)
- PIN: 144517
- Telephone code: 01823
- ISO 3166 code: IN-PB
- Post office: Kahlon
- Website: nawanshahr.nic.in

Daryapur is a village in Shaheed Bhagat Singh Nagar district of Punjab State, India. It is located 6 kilometres (3.7 mi) away from Rahon, 14 kilometres (8.7 mi) from Nawanshahr, 15 kilometres (9.3 mi) from district headquarter Shaheed Bhagat Singh Nagar and 95 kilometres (59 mi) from state capital Chandigarh. The village is administrated by Sarpanch an elected representative of the village.

== Demography ==
As of 2011, Daryapur has a total number of 206 houses and population of 1218 of which 641 include are males while 577 are females according to the report published by Census India in 2011. The literacy rate of Daryapur is 80.22%, higher than the state average of 75.84%. The population of children under the age of 6 years is 146 which is 11.99% of total population of Daryapur, and child sex ratio is approximately 1116 as compared to Punjab state average of 846.

Most of the people are from Schedule Caste which constitutes 67.57% of total population in Daryapur. The town does not have any Schedule Tribe population so far.

As per the report published by Census India in 2011, 543 people were engaged in work activities out of the total population of Daryapur which includes 320 males and 223 females. According to census survey report 2011, 30.22% workers describe their work as main work and 69.80% workers are involved in Marginal activity providing livelihood for less than 6 months.

== Education ==
The village has a Punjabi medium, co-ed private un-aided primary with upper primary and secondary school founded in 2001. The schools does not provide mid-day meal. KC Engineering College and Doaba Khalsa Trust Group Of Institutions are the nearest colleges. Industrial Training Institute for women (ITI Nawanshahr) is 15 kilometres (9.3 mi) and Lovely Professional University is 58 kilometres (36 mi) away from the village.

== Transport ==
Nawanshahr railway station is the nearest train station however, Garhshankar Junction railway station is 25 kilometres (16 mi) away from the village. Sahnewal Airport is the nearest domestic airport which located 52 kilometres (32 mi) away in Ludhiana and the nearest international airport is located in Chandigarh also Sri Guru Ram Dass Jee International Airport is the second nearest airport which is 167 kilometres (104 mi) away in Amritsar.

== See also ==
- List of villages in India
