= Begowal, Nawanshahr =

Begowal
- Village
- Location in Punjab, India Begowal (India)
- Coordinates: 31.0293461°N 75.9953499°E
- Country: India
- State: Punjab
- District: Shaheed Bhagat Singh Nagar

Government
  - Type: Panchayat raj
  - Body: Gram panchayat
- Elevation: 251 m (823 ft)

Population (2011)
  - Total: 760
- Sex ratio 382/378 ♂/♀

Languages
  - Official: Punjabi
- Time zone: UTC+5:30 (IST)
- PIN: 144512
- Telephone code: 01823
- ISO 3166 code: IN-PB
- Post office: Kahma
- Website: nawanshahr.nic.in

Begowal is a village in Shaheed Bhagat Singh Nagar district of Punjab State, India. It is situated on Phambra-Begowal link road and located 18.2 kilometres (11.3 mi) away from postal head office Kahma, 15 kilometres (9.3 mi) from Rahon, 17 kilometres (11 mi) from district headquarter Shaheed Bhagat Singh Nagar and 103 kilometres (64 mi) from state capital Chandigarh. The village is administrated by Sarpanch an elected representative of the village.

== Demography ==
As of 2011, Begowal has a total number of 141 houses and population of 760 of which 382 include are males while 378 are females according to the report published by Census India in 2011. The literacy rate of Begowal is 80.00%, higher than the state average of 75.84%. The population of children under the age of 6 years is 105 which is 13.82% of total population of Begowal, and child sex ratio is approximately 842 as compared to Punjab state average of 846.

Most of the people are from Schedule Caste which constitutes 97.76% of total population in Begowal. The town does not have any Schedule Tribe population so far.

As per the report published by Census India in 2011, 213 people were engaged in work activities out of the total population of Begowal which includes 178 males and 35 females. According to census survey report 2011, 92.96% workers describe their work as main work and 7.04% workers are involved in Marginal activity providing livelihood for less than 6 months.

== Education ==
The village has a Punjabi medium, co-ed primary school founded in 1976. The schools provide mid-day meal as per Indian Midday Meal Scheme. As per Right of Children to Free and Compulsory Education Act the school provide free education to children between the ages of 6 and 14.

Sikh National College Banga and Amardeep Singh Shergill Memorial college Mukandpur are the nearest colleges towards Banga and KC Engineering College and Doaba Khalsa Trust Group Of Institutions are the nearest colleges on the way to Nawanshahr. Industrial Training Institute for women (ITI Nawanshahr) is 19.7 kilometres (12.2 mi) away from the village. Lovely Professional University is 51 kilometres (32 mi) away from the village.

== Transport ==
Nawanshahr train station is the nearest train station however, Garhshankar Junction railway station is 30 kilometres (19 mi) away from the village. Sahnewal Airport is the nearest domestic airport which located 55 kilometres (34 mi) away in Ludhiana and the nearest international airport is located in Chandigarh also Sri Guru Ram Dass Jee International Airport is the second nearest airport which is 160 kilometres (99 mi) away in Amritsar.

== See also ==
- List of villages in India
