= Bazidpur, Nawanshahr =

Bazidpur
- Village
- Location in Punjab, India Bazidpur (India)
- Coordinates: 31.0480164°N 76.0480606°E
- Country: India
- State: Punjab
- District: Shaheed Bhagat Singh Nagar

Government
  - Type: Panchayat raj
  - Body: Gram panchayat
- Elevation: 251 m (823 ft)

Population (2011)
  - Total: 1,932
- Sex ratio 978/954 ♂/♀

Languages
  - Official: Punjabi
- Time zone: UTC+5:30 (IST)
- PIN: 144518
- Telephone code: 01823
- ISO 3166 code: IN-PB
- Post office: Garcha
- Website: nawanshahr.nic.in

Bazidpur is a village in Shaheed Bhagat Singh Nagar district of Punjab State, India. It is situated on Wazidpur-Ludhiana link road and located 4.7 kilometres (2.9 mi) away from postal head office Garcha, 7 kilometres (4.3 mi) from Rahon, 15 kilometres (9.3 mi) from district headquarter Shaheed Bhagat Singh Nagar and 95.8 kilometres (59.5 mi) from state capital Chandigarh. The village is administrated by Sarpanch an elected representative of the village. The current head of Gram Panchayat Bazidpur is Harbhajan Singh who is a retired Army Officer.

== Demography ==
As of 2011, Bazidpur has a total number of 418 houses and population of 1932 of which 978 include are males while 954 are females according to the report published by Census India in 2011. The literacy rate of Bazidpur is 82.37%, higher than the state average of 75.84%. The population of children under the age of 6 years is 162 which is 8.39% of total population of Bazidpur, and child sex ratio is approximately 862 as compared to Punjab state average of 846.

Most of the people are from Schedule Caste which constitutes 8.18% of total population in Bazidpur. The town does not have any Schedule Tribe population so far.

As per the report published by Census India in 2011, 613 people were engaged in work activities out of the total population of Bazidpur which includes 521 males and 92 females. According to census survey report 2011, 82.06% workers describe their work as main work and 17.94% workers are involved in Marginal activity providing livelihood for less than 6 months.

== Education ==
The village has a Punjabi medium, co-ed upper primary with secondary/higher secondary school founded in 1972 The schools provide mid-day meal as per Indian Midday Meal Scheme. As per Right of Children to Free and Compulsory Education Act the school provide free education to children between the ages of 6 and 14.

Sikh National College Banga and Amardeep Singh Shergill Memorial college Mukandpur are the nearest colleges. Lovely Professional University is 52 kilometres (32 mi) away from the village.

== Transport ==
Nawanshahr train station is the nearest train station however, Garhshankar Junction railway station is 26 kilometres (16 mi) away from the village. Sahnewal Airport is the nearest domestic airport which located 53 kilometres (33 mi) away in Ludhiana and the nearest international airport is located in Chandigarh also Sri Guru Ram Dass Jee International Airport is the second nearest airport which is 160 kilometres (99 mi) away in Amritsar.

== See also ==
- List of villages in India
