= Garhi Fateh Khan =

- Village
- Location in Punjab, India Garhi Fateh Khan (India)
- Coordinates: 31.0181387°N 76.0958854°E
- Country: India
- State: Punjab
- District: Shaheed Bhagat Singh Nagar

Government
  - Type: Panchayat raj
  - Body: Gram panchayat
- Elevation: 355 m (1,165 ft)

Population (2011)
  - Total: 887
- Sex ratio 467/421 ♂/♀

Languages
  - Official: Punjabi
- Time zone: UTC+5:30 (IST)
- PIN: 144517
- Telephone code: 01823
- ISO 3166 code: IN-PB
- Post office: Rahon
- Website: nawanshahr.nic.in

Garhi Fateh Khan is a village in Shaheed Bhagat Singh Nagar district of Punjab State, India. It is located 3.7 kilometres (2.3 mi) away from postal head office Rahon, 13.4 kilometres (8.3 mi) from Nawanshahr, 13 kilometres (8.1 mi) from district headquarter Shaheed Bhagat Singh Nagar and 87 kilometres (54 mi) from state capital Chandigarh. The village is administrated by Sarpanch an elected representative of the village.

== Demography ==
As of 2011, Garhi Fateh Khan has a total number of 170 houses and population of 887 of which 467 include are males while 420 are females according to the report published by Census India in 2011. The literacy rate of Garhi Fateh Khan is 82.38%, higher than the state average of 75.84%. The population of children under the age of 6 years is 121 which is 13.64% of total population of Garhi Fateh Khan, and child sex ratio is approximately 1161 as compared to Punjab state average of 846.

Most of the people are from Schedule Caste which constitutes 45.89% of total population in Garhi Fateh Khan. The town does not have any Schedule Tribe population so far.

As per the report published by Census India in 2011, 261 people were engaged in work activities out of the total population of Garhi Fateh Khan which includes 239 males and 22 females. According to census survey report 2011, 98.85% workers describe their work as main work and 1.15% workers are involved in Marginal activity providing livelihood for less than 6 months.

== Education ==
The village has a Punjabi medium, co-ed upper primary school founded in 1981. The schools does not provide mid-day meal. The school provide free education to children between the ages of 6 and 14 as per Right of Children to Free and Compulsory Education Act. KC Engineering College and Doaba Khalsa Trust Group Of Institutions are the nearest colleges. Industrial Training Institute for women (ITI Nawanshahr) is 14 kilometres (8.7 mi) and Lovely Professional University is 58 kilometres (36 mi) away from the village.

== Transport ==
Rahon railway station is the nearest (4.0 kilometres) train station however, Nawanshar Junction railway station is 11.7 km away from the village. Sahnewal Airport is the nearest domestic airport which located 45.2 kilometres (28.1 mi) away in Ludhiana and the nearest international airport is located in Chandigarh also Sri Guru Ram Dass Jee International Airport is the second nearest airport which is 168 kilometres (104 mi) away in Amritsar.

== See also ==
- List of villages in India
