= Pannu Mazara =

Punnu Mazara
- Village
- Location in Punjab, India Punnu Mazara (India)
- Coordinates: 31.1026504°N 76.1331511°E
- Country: India
- State: Punjab
- District: Shaheed Bhagat Singh Nagar

Government
  - Type: Panchayat raj
  - Body: Gram panchayat
- Elevation: 355 m (1,165 ft)

Population (2011)
  - Total: 1,368
- Sex ratio 680/688 ♂/♀

Languages
  - Official: Punjabi
- Time zone: UTC+5:30 (IST)
- PIN: 144514
- Telephone code: 01823
- ISO 3166 code: IN-PB
- Post office: Nawanshahar (S.O)
- Website: nawanshahr.nic.in

Punnu Mazara is a village in Shaheed Bhagat Singh Nagar district of Punjab State, India. It is located 5.2 kilometres (3.2 mi) away from branch post office Nawanshahr, 8.4 kilometres (5.2 mi) from Rahon, 11 kilometres (6.8 mi) from district headquarter Shaheed Bhagat Singh Nagar and 89 kilometres (55 mi) from state capital Chandigarh. The village is administrated by Sarpanch an elected representative of the village. newly gram panchyat is elected previous year 2025. Most of the villagers are settled in the foreign countries. Many people are well settled and highly educated. Some are teachers, doctors and many have other business. But there are still some villagers are not educated. Along with this, as this is very near to the city so masses do not get any kind of problem in transportation.people in the village now live with love and prosperity.

Historical places are also present in village gurudwara shri guru gruna sahib g.where thousands of people paying obesence each year on the martyrdom day of guru Arjun Dev g .

Shri satguru ravidass maharaj gurudwara sahib is also present.

== Demography ==
As of 2011, Punnu Mazara has a total number of 311 houses and population of 1368 of which 680 include are males while 688 are females according to the report published by Census India in 2011. The literacy rate of Punnu Mazara is 82.32% higher than the state average of 75.84%. The population of children under the age of 6 years is 118 which is 8.63% of total population of Punnu Mazara, and child sex ratio is approximately 1185 as compared to Punjab state average of 846.

Most of the people are from Schedule Caste which constitutes 34.21% of total population in Punnu Mazara. The town does not have any Schedule Tribe population so far.

As per the report published by Census India in 2011, 511 people were engaged in work activities out of the total population of Punnu Mazara which includes 448 males and 63 females. According to census survey report 2011, 66.93% workers describe their work as main work and 33.07% workers are involved in Marginal activity providing livelihood for less than 6 months.now fresh survey is started by government of India in 2026.

== Education ==
The village has a Punjabi medium, co-ed primary school established in 1955. The school provide mid-day meal as per Indian Midday Meal Scheme. As per Right of Children to Free and Compulsory Education Act the school provide free education to children between the ages of 6 and 14.

Baradari garden is near to village approximately 3 km.on same side of village location. Site opposite to the village is full of clean environment with link lake of ropar bist canal. Trees on the both side of road provide oxygen available for people helpful for morning and evening walk. The same road also linked to nawanshahr chandigarh highway. [9]

== School in the village is newly constructed building for primary and higher school children. ==
class room are fully equipped.
