= Burj Tehal Dass =

- Village
- Location in Punjab, India Burj Tehal Dass (India)
- Coordinates: 31.0258709°N 75.9811019°E
- Country: India
- State: Punjab
- District: Shaheed Bhagat Singh Nagar

Government
  - Type: Panchayat raj
  - Body: Gram panchayat
- Elevation: 254 m (833 ft)

Population (2011)
  - Total: 903
- Sex ratio 457/446 ♂/♀

Languages
  - Official: Punjabi
- Time zone: UTC+5:30 (IST)
- PIN: 144417
- Telephone code: 01823
- ISO 3166 code: IN-PB
- Post office: Aur
- Website: nawanshahr.nic.in

Burj Tehal Dass is a village in Shaheed Bhagat Singh Nagar district of Punjab State, India. It is located 18 kilometres (11 mi) away from Rahon, 18 kilometres (11 mi) from Nawanshahr, 11 kilometres (6.8 mi) from district headquarter Shaheed Bhagat Singh Nagar and 107 kilometres (66 mi) from state capital Chandigarh. The village is administrated by Sarpanch an elected representative of the village.

== Demography ==
As of 2011, Burj Tehal Dass has a total number of 158 houses and population of 903 of which 457 include are males while 446 are females according to the report published by Census India in 2011. The literacy rate of Burj Tehal Dass is 74.97%, lower than the state average of 75.84%. The population of children under the age of 6 years is 108 which is 11.96% of total population of Burj Tehal Dass, and child sex ratio is approximately 1160 as compared to Punjab state average of 846.

Most of the people are from Schedule Caste which constitutes 53.27% of total population in Burj Tehal Dass. The town does not have any Schedule Tribe population so far.

As per the report published by Census India in 2011, 245 people were engaged in work activities out of the total population of Burj Tehal Dass which includes 235 males and 10 females. According to census survey report 2011, 86.94% workers describe their work as main work and 13.06% workers are involved in Marginal activity providing livelihood for less than 6 months.

== Education ==
The village has Punjabi medium, co-ed primary school which provide education until class 5 and a middle school which provide education until class 8. The schools provide mid-day meal as per Indian Midday Meal Scheme and the meal prepared in school premises. As per Right of Children to Free and Compulsory Education Act the school provide free education to children between the ages of 6 and 14.

Amardeep Singh Shergill Memorial college Mukandpur and Sikh National College Banga are the nearest colleges. Lovely Professional University is 52 kilometres (32 mi) away from the village.

== Transport ==
Namanshahr railway station is the nearest train station however, Garhshankar Junction railway station is 31 kilometres (19 mi) away from the village. Sahnewal Airport is the nearest domestic airport which located 51 kilometres (32 mi) away in Ludhiana and the nearest international airport is located in Chandigarh also Sri Guru Ram Dass Jee International Airport is the second nearest airport which is 163 kilometres (101 mi) away in Amritsar.

== See also ==
- List of villages in India
