= Ahsan Iqbal =

Pakistani politician

- احسن اقبال
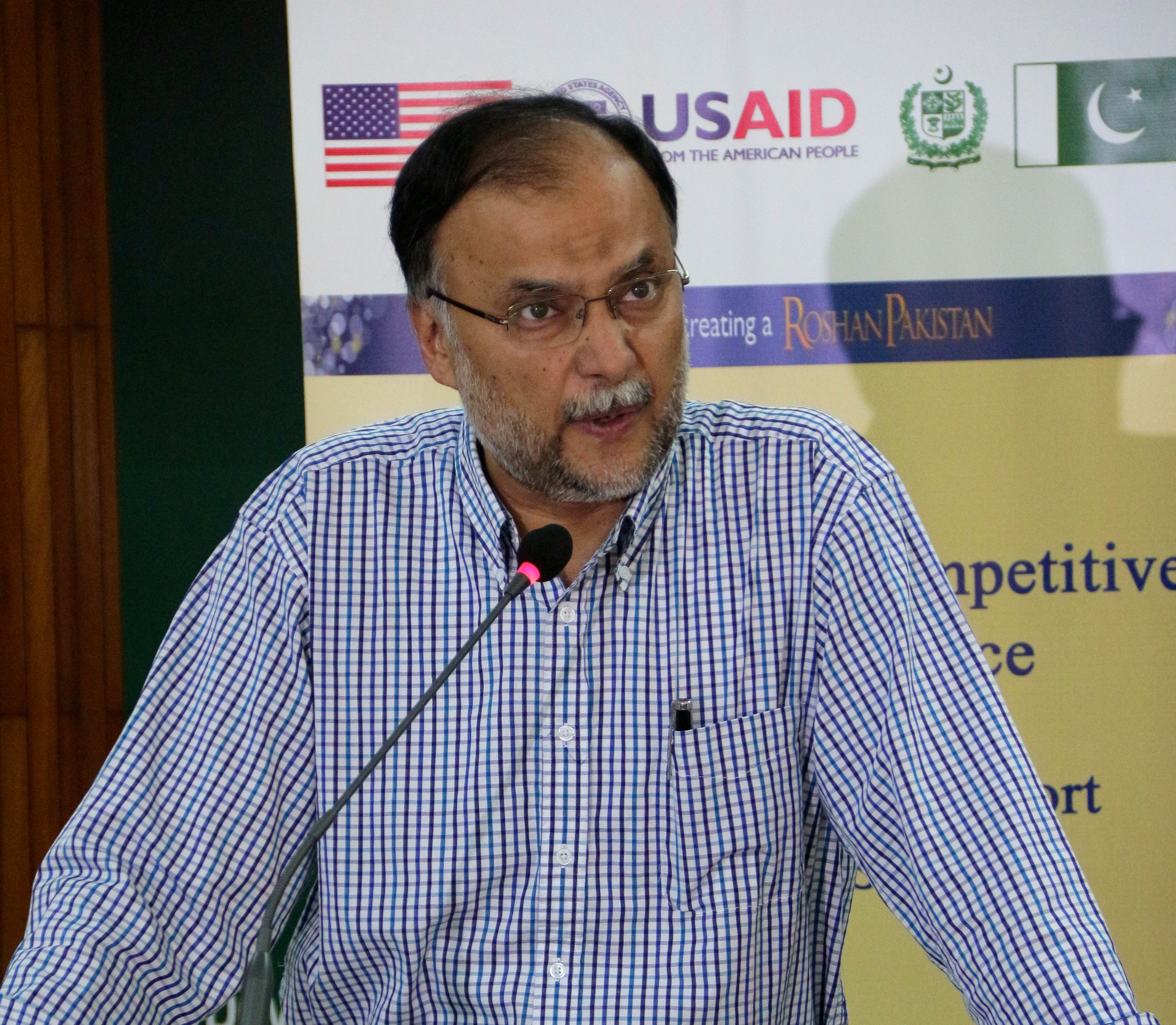
- Iqbal in 2014

Minister of Planning Development & Special Initiatives
- Incumbent
- Assumed office 11 March 2024
- President: Asif Ali Zardari
- Prime Minister: Shehbaz Sharif
- Preceded by: Sami Saeed
- In office 19 April 2022 – 10 August 2023
- President: Arif Alvi
- Prime Minister: Shehbaz Sharif
- Preceded by: Asad Umar
- Succeeded by: Sami Saeed (caretaker)
- In office 16 September 2017 – 31 May 2018
- President: Mamnoon Hussain
- Prime Minister: Shahid Khaqan Abbasi
- Preceded by: Himself
- Succeeded by: Shamshad Akhtar
- In office 7 June 2013 – 28 July 2017
- President: Mamnoon Hussain
- Prime Minister: Nawaz Sharif
- Preceded by: Naveed Qamar
- Succeeded by: Himself

Deputy Chairman of the Planning Commission of Pakistan
- In office 8 June 2013 – 28 July 2017
- Preceded by: Dr. Nadeem Ul Haque
- Succeeded by: Sartaj Aziz
- In office 13 August 1998 – 12 October 1999
- Preceded by: Hafeez Pasha
- Succeeded by: Dr. Shahid Amjad Chaudhry

Minister of Education
- In office 31 March 2008 – 13 May 2008
- Preceded by: Javed Ashraf Qazi

Minister of Minorities
- In office 31 March 2008 – 13 May 2008

35th Minister of Interior
- In office 4 August 2017 – 31 May 2018
- President: Mamnoon Hussain
- Prime Minister: Shahid Khaqan Abbasi
- Preceded by: Nisar Ali Khan
- Succeeded by: Muhammad Azam Khan (caretaker)

Member of the National Assembly of Pakistan
- Incumbent
- Assumed office 29 February 2024
- In office 2008–2023
- In office 1993–1999

Personal details
- Born: 28 March 1959 (age 67) Narowall, Punjab, Pakistan
- Party: PML(N) (since 1993)
- Relatives: Chaudhry Abdul Rehman Khan (maternal grandfather); Nisar Fatima (mother); Ahmad Iqbal Chaudhary (son)
- Education: University of Engineering and Technology; Wharton School of the University of Pennsylvania

Ahsan Iqbal Chaudhary (Punjabi: احسن اقبال چوہدری; born 28 March 1959) is a Pakistani politician currently holding the position of Federal Minister of Planning, Development, and Special Initiatives and Inter Provincial Coordination. He is also the Secretary General of the PMLN and has been a member of the National Assembly of Pakistan since 29 February 2024.

Previously, Chaudhary served as a member of the National Assembly during various terms: from August 2018 to August 2023, from 2008 to May 2018, and from 1993 to 1999.

He held ministerial positions in several cabinets. He served as the Federal Minister for Planning and Development from 19 April 2022 to 10 August 2023 in the PDM government. From 2017 to May 2018, he served as both the Minister for Interior and Minister for Planning, Development and Reforms in the Abbasi cabinet. In the third Sharif's ministry, he held the positions of the Minister of Planning and Development of Pakistan and the Deputy Chairman of Planning Commission of Pakistan and briefly served as the Minister of Minorities and Minister of Education of Pakistan in the Gillani ministry in 2008. He also assumed the role of the Deputy Chairman of the Planning Commission of Pakistan from 1998 to 1999 during the Sharif's second ministry. Moreover, he served as federal minister for planning and development from 19 April 2022 to 10 August 2023.

== Family and education ==
According to PILDAT, Chaudhary was born on 28 March 1959. According to The News International, he was born on 28 September 1958.

Belonging to a Punjabi Rajput family, his maternal grandfather Chaudhry Abdul Rahman Khan was a member of the Punjab Legislative Assembly during the British Raj, later the family had to move out of Jalandhar, now in Indian Punjab, due to the 1947 partition.

His mother Nisar Fatima was the member of the National Assembly of Pakistan on reserved seats for women in the 1985 Pakistani general election.

His brother Mustafa Kamal has served as the chairman of the Parks and Horticulture Authority (PHA).

Chaudhary received his early education from the PAF College Sargodha. He attended the University of Engineering and Technology, Lahore to study mechanical engineering in 1976 from where he graduated with BSc in 1981.

In 1984, Chaudhary attended the Wharton School of the University of Pennsylvania from where he did MBA in 1986. Dawn reported that he also attended Government College Lahore, Georgetown University and Harvard University.

== Political career ==
=== Jamat-i-Islami ===
Chaudhary started politics as president of the student union of University of Engineering and Technology. He was then associated with Islami Jamiat Tulaba, student wing of the right wing Jamat-i-Islami.

=== Pakistan Muslim League (N) ===
In the 1993 Pakistani general election, he became member of the National Assembly for the first time after winning constituency NA-117 of Narowal. In 1993, he served as Policy and Public Affairs Assistant to then Prime Minister of Pakistan.

He was re-elected as the member of the National Assembly for the second time in the 1997 Pakistani general election. when his party PML-N won clear majority in National Assembly for the first time in the history of Pakistan, Chaudhary played his role in several key government positions. He was appointed the Deputy Chairman of the Planning Commission of Pakistan with the title of Minister of State, chairman Pakistan Engineering Council and was also a chairman for the National Steering Committees on Information Technology and IQM and Productivity. Chaudhary continued on the positions allotted to him till the 1999 Pakistani coup d'état in which then Chief of Army Staff, Pervez Musharraf, overthrew elected Prime Minister Nawaz Sharif and his existing elected government. Dawn reported that on Chaudhary's initiative Pakistan's first national IT policy was formulated.

In the 2002 Pakistani general election, he lost the National Assembly seat. During the Musharraf rule, Chaudhary taught management at the Mohammad Ali Jinnah University in Islamabad from 2000 to 2007. Chaudhary is considered a loyalist of Nawaz Sharif who kept the PML-N alive during the Musharraf rule.

In the 2008 Pakistani general election, Chaudhary was re-elected as the member of the National Assembly for the third time. He briefly served as the Minister for Education of Pakistan with an additional portfolio of Minister of Minorities' Affairs in the Gillani ministry. But after PML-N decided to sit on opposition benches due to a disagreement with PPP related to the reinstatement of the judges dismissed by former President Pervez Musharraf in 2007, he resigned six weeks into the newly formed PPP-led coalition government.

In 2011, Chaudhary was elected as Deputy Secretary General of PML-N.

In the 2013 Pakistani general election, Chaudhary was made part of PML-N's central parliamentary board tasked with selecting candidates for the election. Chaudhary was re-elected as the member of the National Assembly for the fourth time in 2013 general election. He was appointed the Minister of Planning and Development as well the Deputy Chairman of Planning Commission of Pakistan.

In February 2016, Chaudhary was appointed the United Nations Development Programme's 'champion minister' from the Asia Pacific region in recognition of his efforts to promote the Sustainable Development Goals.

In July 2017, the federal cabinet, which included Chaudhary was disbanded following the resignation of Prime Minister Nawaz Sharif after the Panama Papers case (Pakistan) decision. Following the election of Shahid Khaqan Abbasi as Prime Minister of Pakistan, Chaudhary was inducted into the federal cabinet of Abbasi and was appointed Minister for Interior for the first time. On 16 September 2017, he was given the additional charge of Ministry of Planning and Development. In November 2017, he was criticised by the Chairman of the Senate of Pakistan Raza Rabbani for not taking Senate in confidence with regards to the crackdown against the 2017 Tehreek-e-Labaik protest which led to resignation of Minister for Law and Justice, Zahid Hamid. Upon the dissolution of the National Assembly on the expiration of its term on 31 May 2018, Chaudhry ceased to hold the office as Federal Minister for Interior and Federal Minister for Planning, Development and Reform.

He was re-elected to the National Assembly as a candidate of PML-N from Constituency NA-78 (Narowal-II) in the 2018 Pakistani general election. He received 159,651 votes and defeated Abrar-ul-Haq, a candidate of Pakistan Tehreek-e-Insaf (PTI).

He was arrested on 23 December 2019 by the NAB, over the alleged Narowal sports complex corruption charges. He was eventually released after 90 days in custody, as the NAB failed to come up with a case against him.

He was re-elected to the National Assembly as a candidate of PML-N from NA-76 Narowal-II in the 2024 Pakistani general election. He received 137,042 and defeated Javaid Safdar Kahlon, an Independent politician, (PTI) Supported Pakistan Tehreek-e-Insaf.

== Assassination attempt ==
In May 2018, Chaudhary was shot and wounded at a political rally in his home constituency Narowal in an apparent assassination attempt. He was airlifted from Narowal to Lahore for surgery where he was said to be in stable condition. The attacker, found to be linked with Tehreek-e-Labaik, was arrested from the spot. In his police statement he confessed that he tried to assassinate Chaudhry on the issue of the blasphemy laws.

== Writings ==
He has written op-eds for The News International, an English-language daily newspaper.

Political offices
Preceded by Hafeez Pasha	Deputy Chairman of the Planning Commission of Pakistan; 1998—1999	Succeeded by Dr. Shahid Amjad Chaudhry
Preceded by	Minister for Minorities; 2008—2008	Succeeded by
Preceded by Javed Ashraf Qazi	Minister for Education; 2008—2008	Succeeded by
Preceded by Naveed Qamar	Minister for Planning and Development; 2013—2017	Succeeded by
Preceded by Dr. Nadeem Ul Haque	Deputy Chairman of the Planning Commission of Pakistan; 2013—2017	Succeeded by
Preceded by Nisar Ali Khan	Minister for Interior; 2017—2018	Succeeded by
Preceded by	Minister for Planning and Development; 2017—2018	Succeeded by
