= Aisha Ghaus Pasha =

Pakistani politician

Member of the National Assembly of Pakistan
- In office 13 August 2018 – 10 August 2023
- Constituency: Reserved seat for women

Member of the Provincial Assembly of the Punjab
- In office June 2013 – 31 May 2018
- Constituency: Reserved seat for women

Personal details
- Born: 3 March 1962 (age 64) Lahore, Punjab, Pakistan
- Party: PMLN
- Spouse: Hafeez A. Pasha

Aisha Ghaus Pasha (Urdu: عائشہ غوث پاشا; born 3 March 1962) is a Pakistani politician and economist. In April 2022, she was appointed as a State Minister in the newly formed 34-member Cabinet. She is one of the five female members of the new Pakistan Federal Cabinet. She had been a member of the National Assembly of Pakistan from August 2018 till August 2023. Previously she was a Member of the Provincial Assembly of the Punjab, from June 2013 to May 2018.

== Early life and education ==
Pasha was born on 3 March 1962 in Lahore. She earned the degrees of Bachelor of Arts (Hons), Master of Arts in Economics and a Masters of Applied Science in Economics from the University of Karachi. Pasha is married to Hafeez Pasha, an economist and former advisor to the Federal Government.

== Political career ==
She was elected to the Provincial Assembly of the Punjab as a candidate of Pakistan Muslim League (N) (PML-N) on a reserved seat for women in June 2013. In May 2015, she was inducted into the provincial cabinet of the Chief Minister Shehbaz Sharif and was made Provincial Minister of Punjab for Finance.

She was elected to the National Assembly of Pakistan as a candidate of PML-N on a reserved seat for women from Punjab in the 2018 Pakistani general election.
