= Chaudhry Abdul Rehman Khan =

Indian politician

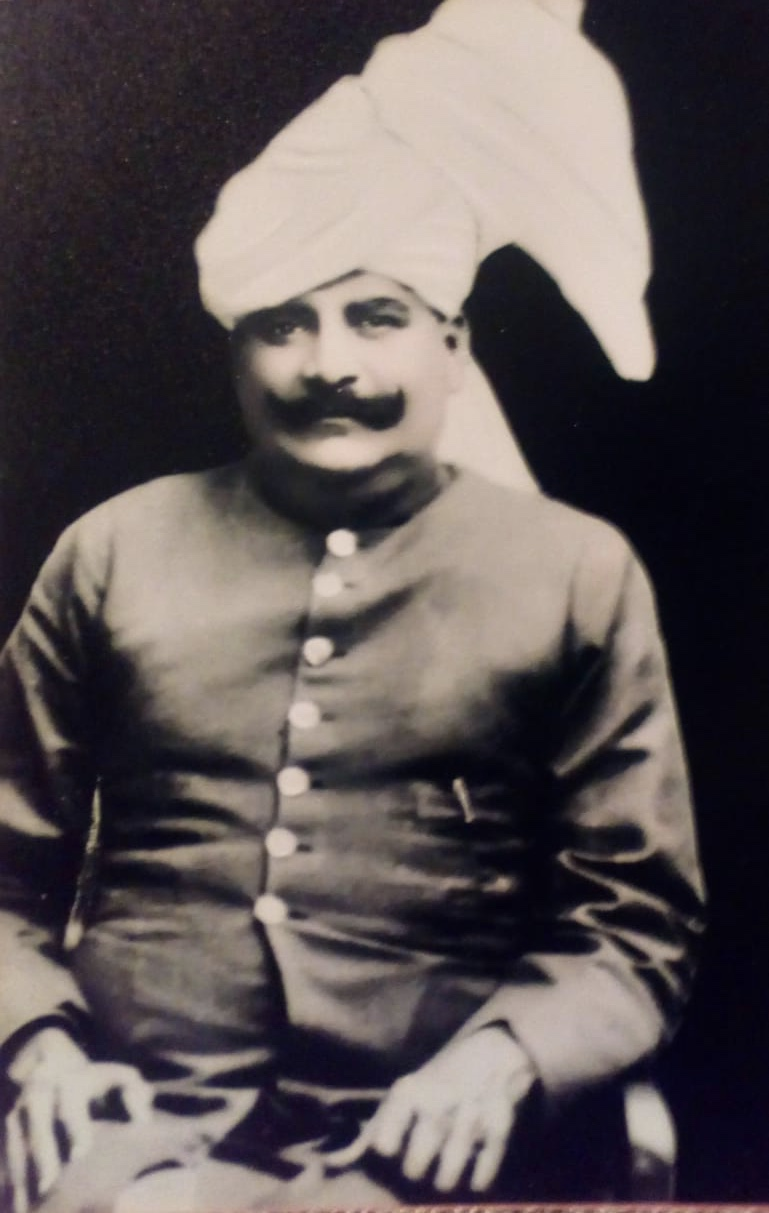

Personal details
- Born: Abdul Rehman Khan Rahon Jullunder
- Parent: Chaudhary Ameer Muhammad Khan (father)
- Relatives: Nisar Fatima (daughter); Ahsan Iqbal (maternal grandson); Mujtaba Jamal (maternal grandson)
- Known for: Member of the Legislative Assembly

Chaudhary Rana Muhammad Abdul Rehman Khan was the Rana of Rahon Jagir and Member of the Punjab Legislative Assembly. (3 January 1927 to 26 July 1930; 24 October 1930 to 10 November 1936; 5 April 1937 to 19 March 1945)

== Biography ==
Chaudhary Rana Muhammad Abdul Rehman Khan was the son of Chaudhary Ameer Muhammad Khan, and was born in Rahon Jullunder. He was the Chief of the Ghorewaha Rajput tribe. He completed his primary education from Jullunder. Khan became the Rana of Rahon and MLA after the death of Chaudhary Jang Baz Khan who was his elder brother and previous Rana of Rahon. He was elected a member of the Punjab Legislative Assembly from Jullunder for the first time in 1927, and remained a member of that assembly having won successive elections till 19 March 1945. Khan helped develop Rahon by giving the fort of Rana Udho to build one of the first schools of Rahon and funded the first train station of Rahon.

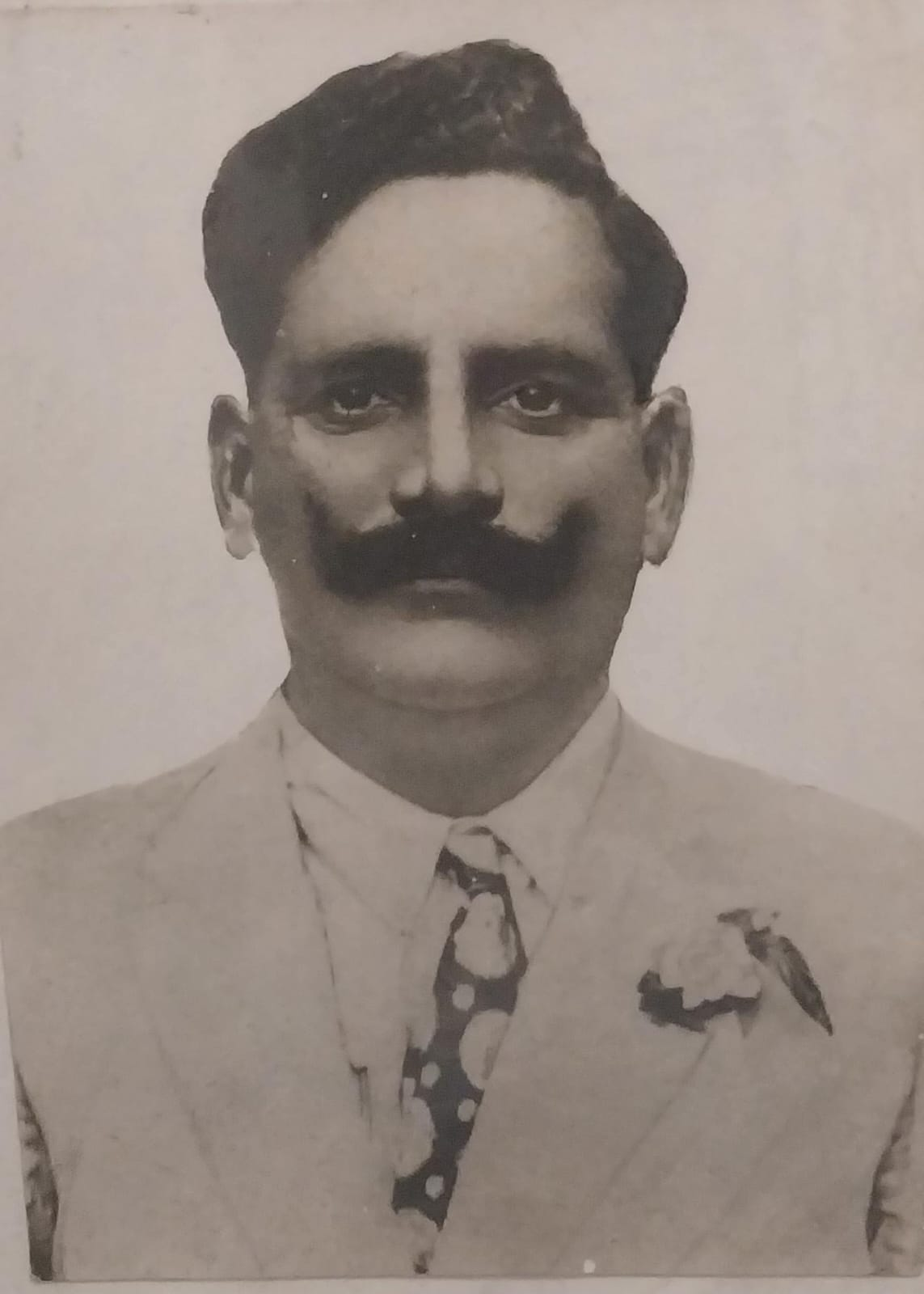
Rana Chaudhary Abdul Rehman Khan of Rahon in British Attire.

After independence in 1947, Khan moved to Pakistan and settled in Minchanabad, Bahawalnagar. He died in 1952. He is buried in Miani Sahib in Lahore. His closest companion is Malik Wazir Khan in Rahon. Wazir Khan's family settled in Hafizabad near Khanqah Dogran.

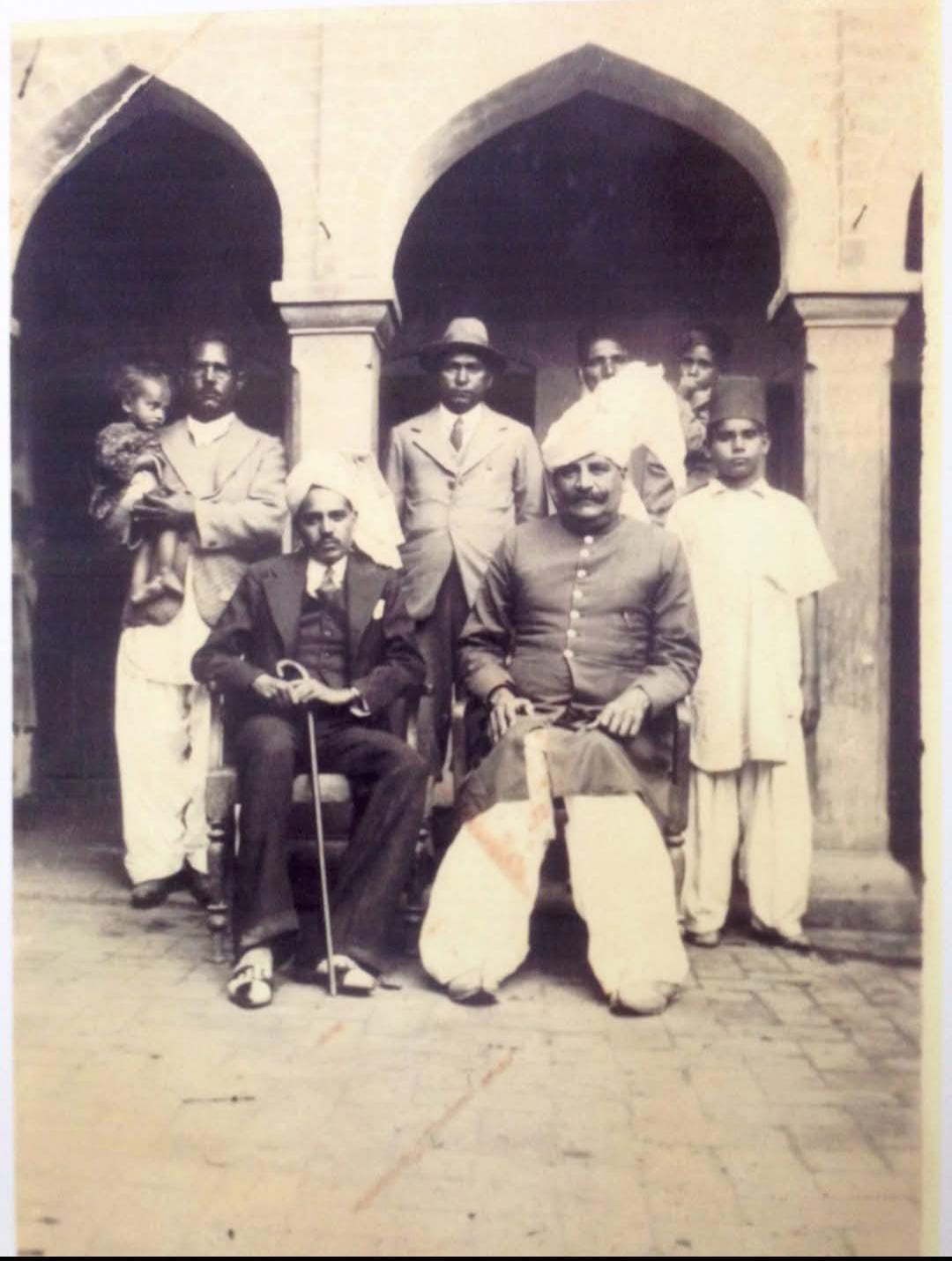
Rana of Rahon in Bahawalnagar post partition.

Rana Fazlur Rehman Mahmood was his eldest son. He trained to become a lawyer, and settled the family in Rehmanabad near Khanqa Dogran where he remained active in politics and community life of Rehmanabad.

Khan's daughter Apa Nisar Fatima went on to serve as an MNA in the government of General Zia Ul Haq. Ahsan Iqbal and Barrister Mujtaba Jamal are his maternal grandsons. Barrister Mujtaba Jamal is active in politics in Rehmanabad, taking after Rana Fazlur Rehman Mahmood.
