= Hafeez Pasha (economist) =

Pakistani politician

Academic background
- Alma mater: Stanford University

Academic work
- Institutions: Beaconhouse National University

Hafeez Ahmed Pasha (Urdu: حفیظ احمد پاشا) is a Pakistani economist and former politician who has served as the Federal Minister for Finance.

== Early life and career ==
Also spelled as Hafiz Pasha, he completed his master's degree from Cambridge University, England, and a PhD from Stanford University, USA.

He has served as the dean of the School of Social Sciences at the Beaconhouse National University, Lahore and is currently the Professor Emeritus. Pasha has served till 2007 as a United Nations Assistant Secretary General and United Nations Development Program Assistant Administrator and a director of the Regional Bureau for Asia and the Pacific. He is the first Pakistani to hold this distinction.

He has served as the Federal Minister for Finance, Federal Minister of Commerce, and Economic Affairs, Deputy Chairman of the Planning Commission, with the status of a federal minister, Education Minister and Commerce Minister in three governments.

Earlier, he was the Vice Chancellor of the University of Karachi, Dean and Director of the Institute of Business Administration, and research professor and Director of the Applied Economics Research Centre.

== Personal life ==
He is married to the former Minister of Finance of the Punjab Aisha Ghaus Pasha.
