= Planning and Development Secretary of Pakistan =

Administrative post of the ministry of Planning and Development

- معتمدِ منصوبہ بندی و ترقی پاکستان
- Reports to: Minister for Planning and Development
- Appointer: Prime Minister of Pakistan
- Website: Ministry of Planning and Development

The Planning and Development Secretary of Pakistan (Urdu: معتمدِ منصوبہ بندی و ترقی پاکستان), also referred to as Secretary P&D, is the Federal Secretary for the Ministry of Planning and Development. The Secretary P&D plays a key role in the country's economic planning and development activity, making it a highly coveted position in the federal government. The position holder is a BPS-22 grade officer, usually belonging to the Pakistan Administrative Service. The Secretary is also a part of the Planning Commission.

== See also ==
- Government of Pakistan
- Federal Secretary
- Interior Secretary of Pakistan
- Cabinet Secretary of Pakistan
- Finance Secretary of Pakistan
- Petroleum Secretary of Pakistan
- Ministry of Planning and Development (Pakistan)
