= Nisar Fatima =

Pakistani politician and Islamic scholar

Nisar Fatima Zahra MNA

Member of the National Assembly of Pakistan
- In office 1985–1988

Personal details
- Born: Fatima Zahra; 14 October 1935
- Died: 2 September 1991 (aged 55)
- Spouse: Iqbal Ahmed Chaudhary
- Relatives: Ahsan Iqbal (son)

Nisar Fatima Zahra (14 October 1935 – 2 September 1991 in Lahore) was a Pakistani politician and religious scholar who served as a member of the National Assembly of Pakistan. She was daughter of Chaudhry Abdul Rehman Khan from Rehmanabad, Khanqah Dogran. She also served as a member of Islamic Ideology Council and played a role in the formation of anti-blasphemy law in the country.

She founded the Apa Nisar Fatima Girls High School to promote the cause of girls' education among low-income people. She was married to the late Iqbal Ahmed Chaudhry and had four sons and two daughters. She was the mother of interior minister of Pakistan, Ahsan Iqbal.
