= Ghorewaha =

- Location of Ghorewaha in Punjab, India Ghorewaha (India)
- Coordinates: 31°36′55″N 75°41′55″E
- Country: India
- State: Punjab
- Region of Punjab: Doaba
- District: Hoshiarpur
- Elevation: 296 m (971 ft)

Population (2011 Census)
  - Total: 860
- Demonym(s): Ghorewahiya, Ghorewahiye

Languages
  - Official: Punjabi, Hindi, English
- Time zone: UTC+5:30 (IST)
- PIN: 146116
- Area code: +91-1886
- Vehicle registration: PB07

Ghorewaha is a village in Tanda tehsil, Hoshiarpur district of Punjab State, India. It is located 25 kilometres (16 mi) west of the district headquarters at Hoshiarpur, 9 kilometres (5.6 mi) from Tanda, 42 kilometres (26 mi) from Jalandhar, and 166 kilometres (103 mi) from the state capital of Chandigarh.

Ghorewaha Pin code is 146116.

Babak (1 km), Littar (1 km), Nangal Jamal (1 km), Nangal Farid (1 km), Jaura (2 km), Chahal (3 km) are the nearby villages to Ghorewaha. Ghorewaha is surrounded by Urmar Tanda Tehsil towards North, Bhogpur Tehsil towards South, Bhunga Tehsil towards North, Hoshiarpur-I Tehsil towards East.

Ghorewaha is on the border of Hoshiarpur district, Jalandhar district and Kapurthala district.

The famous novel by Jagdish Chandra, which is a prescribed book in the curriculum of Hindi Literature courses of many universities, has the village of Ghorewaha as the location where the story of the novel is based. The novel is about the 'chamars'- the cobblers who live in 'Chamadari' locality of Ghorewaha and their plight in a society dominated by the upper caste.

== Education ==
Ghorewaha has two schools, one government school and a private school (Christian Green Wood Senior Secondary School). The village has a literacy rate of 78%.

== See also ==
- List of villages in India
