= Ministry of Planning Development & Special Initiatives =

Ministry of the Government of Pakistan

- وزارت منصوبہ بندی ترقی و خصوصی امور

Government agency overview
- Formed: 2013; 13 years ago
- Jurisdiction: Government of Pakistan
- Headquarters: Islamabad,
- Ministers responsible: Ahsan Iqbal, Federal Minister; Armaghan Subhani, Minister of State
- Government agency executives: Zafar Hassan, Planning and Development Secretary of Pakistan; Ahsan Iqbal, Deputy Chairman Planning Commission
- Website: www.pc.gov.pk

The Ministry of Planning Development & Special Initiatives (Urdu: وزارت منصوبہ بندی ترقی و خصوصی امور, abbreviated as MoPD) is headed by the Minister for Planning Development & Special Initiatives, who must be a member of Parliament of Pakistan. The minister is also deputy chairman of Planning Commission of Pakistan. The administrative head of the Ministry is the Planning and Development Secretary of Pakistan.

== Planning Commission of Pakistan ==
The main division under the ministry is the Planning Commission of Pakistan which is responsible for financial and public policy development institution of the Government of Pakistan. The Planning Commission undertakes research studies and state policy development initiatives for the growth of national economy and the expansion of the public and state infrastructure of the country.

=== Vision 2025 ===
The Vision 2025 is the country's long–term development blueprint which aims to create a globally competitive and prosperous country providing a high quality of life for all its citizens.

==== Priority areas ====
- Integrated energy
- Modernization of infrastructure
- Institutional reform and modernization of the public sector
- Value-addition in commodity producing sectors
- Export promotion
- Water and food security
- Private sector-led growth and entrepreneurship
- Climate action

== Pakistan Institute of Development Economics ==
The Pakistan Institute of Development Economics is a post-graduate research institute, and a public policy think tank located in the vicinity of Islamabad, Pakistan.

== Pakistan Planning and Management Institute ==
The Pakistan Planning and Management Institute (PPMI) is a division of the Planning Commission. The main objectives of PPMI are to improve technical and analytical skills and enhance expertise of the federal, provincial and district governments' officers through training in areas of Project Management, Social development and application of information technology in project management.

== Federal Drought Emergency Relief Assistance (DERA) Unit ==
The function of DERA Unit is to facilitate the implementation of the project in the drought-hit areas of all the four provinces and coordinate activities carried out in the provinces to mitigate the effects of drought.

== National Fertilizer Development Centre ==
The National Fertilizer Development Centre (NFDC) was set up by the government in 1977. With the help of foreign funding NFDC studies all fertilizer-related problems from the supply source to the farmers' fields, with a view to helping in the formulation of Government policies and their implementation and to give support to other institutions.

== List of Ministers ==
N°	Federal planning minister		Term of office		
N°	Portrait	Name	Took office	Left office	Time in office
1	Portrait of Ahsan Iqbal	Ahsan Iqbal	June 7, 2013	July 28, 2017	4 years, 51 days
2	Portrait of Ahsan Iqbal	Ahsan Iqbal (additional charge)	September 15, 2017	May 31, 2018	258 days
3	Portrait of Shamshad Akhtar	Shamshad Akhtar (caretaker)	June 5, 2018	August 18, 2018	74 days
4	Portrait of Khusro Bakhtiar	Khusro Bakhtiar	August 20, 2018	November 18, 2019	1 year, 90 days
5	Portrait of Asad Umar	Asad Umar	November 19, 2019	April 10, 2022	2 years, 142 days
6	Portrait of Ahsan Iqbal	Ahsan Iqbal	April 19, 2022	August 10, 2023	1 year, 113 days
7		Muhammad Sami Saeed (caretaker)	August 17, 2023	March 4, 2024	200 days
8	Portrait of Ahsan Iqbal	Ahsan Iqbal	March 11, 2024	Incumbent	2 years, 202 days

== See also ==
- National Logistics Corporation (NLC)
- Economy of Pakistan
