= Udhowal =

- Village (Punjab, India)
- Location in Punjab, India Udhowal (India)
- Coordinates: 31.0351725°N 75.4265821°E
- Country: India
- State: Punjab
- District: Jalandhar
- Tehsil: Nakodar

Government
  - Type: Panchayat raj
  - Body: Gram panchayat
- Elevation: 240 m (790 ft)

Population (2011)
  - Total: 1,339
- Sex ratio 671/668 ♂/♀

Languages
  - Official: Punjabi
- Time zone: UTC+5:30 (IST)
- ISO 3166 code: IN-PB
- Vehicle registration: PB- 08
- Website: jalandhar.nic.in

Udhowal is a village in Nakodar in Jalandhar district of Punjab State, India. It is located 15 kilometres (9.3 mi) from Nakodar, 48 kilometres (30 mi) from Kapurthala, 39 kilometres (24 mi) from district headquarter Jalandhar and 164 kilometres (102 mi) from state capital Chandigarh. The village is administrated by a sarpanch who is an elected representative of village as per Panchayati raj (India).

School/Education

Originally a primary school, Udhowal's village school achieved senior secondary school status in 1991. It has drawn students from more than fifty surrounding villages.

== Demography ==
As of 2011, The village has a total number of 254 houses and population of 1339 of which include 671 are males while 668 are females according to the report published by Census India in 2011. Literacy rate of the village is 78.75%, higher than state average of 75.84%. The population of children under the age of 6 years is 125 which is 9.34% of total population of the village, and child sex ratio is approximately 1272 higher than the state average of 846.

Most of the people are from Schedule Caste which constitutes 43.76% of total population in the village. The town does not have any Schedule Tribe population so far.

As per census 2011, 398 people were engaged in work activities out of the total population of the village which includes 358 males and 40 females. According to census survey report 2011, 77.39% workers describe their work as main work and 22.61% workers are involved in marginal activity providing livelihood for less than 6 months.

== Transport ==
Nakodar railway station is the nearest train station. The village is 75 kilometres (47 mi) away from domestic airport in Ludhiana and the nearest international airport is located in Chandigarh also Sri Guru Ram Dass Jee International Airport is the second nearest airport which is 129 kilometres (80 mi) away in Amritsar.
