= Planning Commission (Pakistan) =

Research institute and advisory agency involving economic policy

Planning Commission of Pakistan

Agency overview
- Formed: July 8, 1952; 74 years ago
- Superseding agency: Ministry of Planning Development & Reform
- Jurisdiction: Government of Pakistan
- Headquarters: Islamabad, Pakistan
- Annual budget: See (2014 Federal Budget)
- Minister responsible: Ahsan Iqbal, Federal Minister of Planning, Development, Reforms and Special Innitiatives
- Agency executives: Prime Minister of Pakistan, Chairman, Planning Commission; Ahsan Iqbal, Deputy Chairman, Planning Commission
- Website: www.pc.gov.pk

The Planning Commission (denoted as PC) (Urdu: منصوبہ بندی کمیشن پاکستان) is a financial and public policy development institution of the Government of Pakistan. The Commission comes under Ministry of Planning Development & Special Initiatives The Planning Commission undertakes research studies and state policy development initiatives for the growth of national economy and the expansion of the public and state infrastructure of the country in tandem with the Ministry of Finance (MoF).

Since 1952, the commission has had a major influence and role in formulating the highly centralized and planned five-year plans for the national economy, for most of the 20th century in Pakistan. Although the five-year plans were replaced by Medium Term Development Framework, the commission still played an influential and central role in the development of the programme. Furthermore, the Public Sector Development Programme (PSDP) also placed under the domain of the planning commission. The commission's authoritative figures includes a Chairman who is the Prime Minister, assisted by the deputy chairman, and a science advisor.

Other officials of the commission include Planning and Development Secretary of Pakistan; Chief Economist; Director of the Pakistan Institute of Development Economics; executive director of Policy Implementation and Monitoring (PIM); and members for Social Sectors, Science and Technology, Energy, Infrastructure and Food and Agriculture.

== History ==
Prime Minister Liaquat Ali Khan established an independent institution, a Development Board (DB), in the Ministry of Economic Affairs (MoEA) in 1948.

Finally, in 1953 Prime minister Khawaja Nazimuddin decided to give commission to an institution that was set up on 18 July 1953. Ultimately, Zahid Hussain, former Governor of State Bank of Pakistan was appointed its first deputy chairman and two other members.

== List of Deputy Chairman Planning Commission ==
This is the list of the former deputy chairmen of the planning commission of Pakistan.

1. Zahid Hussain, 1953 – 1958
2. G. Ahmed, 1958 – 1959
3. Mumtaz Hassan Khan, 1959 – 1961
4. Said Hasan, 1962 – 1966
5. M. M. Ahmad, 1967 to 1969
6. M. H. Soofi, 1969 to 1970
7. Mahboob Ullah Rashid, 1970 – 1971
8. Qamar ul Islam, 1971 – 1973
9. Prof. Khurshid Ahmad, 30-08-1978 to 21–04–1979
10. Mahbub ul Haq, 07-03-1982 to 13–04–1983
11. V. A. Jafary, 22-09-1985 to 10–07–1986
12. A G N Kazi, 10-07-1986 to 23–08–1993
13. Saeed Ahmed Qureshi, 24-08-1993 to 30–06–1994
14. Qazi M. Alimullah, 01-07-1994 to 05–11–1996
15. Dr. Hafiz Pasha, 12-11-1996 to 12–08–1998
16. Ahsan Iqbal, 13-08-1998 to 12–10–1999
17. Dr. Shahid Amjad, 27-07-2000 to 08–08–2003
18. Engr. Dr. M. Akram Sheikh, 15-03-2004 to 07–05–2008
19. M. Salman Faruqui, 09-05-2008 to 28–11–2008
20. Sardar Assef Ahmed Ali, 29-11-2008 to 13–01–2010
21. Dr. Ishfaq Ahmad, 15-01-2010 to 31–04–2010
22. Dr. Nadeem ul Haque 01-05-2010 to 07–06–2013
23. Ahsan Iqbal, 08-06-2013 to 28–07–2017
24. Sartaj Aziz, 13-08-2017 to 31–05–2018
25. Khusro Bakhtiar, 20-08-2018 to 01–08–2019
26. Dr. Jehanzeb Khan, 01-08-2019 to 11–06–2022
27. Ahsan Iqbal, 12-06-2022 t0 24–08–2023
28. Dr. Jehanzeb Khan, 25-08-2023 to 29–08–2024
29. Ahsan Iqbal, 30-08-2024 to date

== List of Chief Economist of Pakistan ==
This is the list of the history of all Chief Economists of Pakistan.

1. Mr. M.L. Qureshi, 1956–1961
2. Dr. Mahbub ul Haq, 1967–1970
3. Dr. Jawaid Azfar, 1981–1983
4. Mr. Mansur Hassan Khan, 1983–1986
5. Dr. Arshad Zaman, 1987–1992
6. Mr. Fasihuddin, 1992–1995
7. Dr. A.R. Kemal, 1997–1999
8. Dr. Mushtaq Ahmad, 1999–2000
9. Dr. Pervez Tahir, 2000–2006
10. Dr. M. Shaukat Ali, 2006–2007
11. Dr. Rashid Amjad, 2008–2010
12. Dr. Jaffar Qamar, 2010–2011
13. Dr. M. Nadeem Javaid, 2014–2018
14. Mr. Syed Ejaz Wasti, 2018-2018
15. Dr. Muhammad Ahmad, 2021–2022
16. Dr. M. Nadeem Javaid, 2022–2023

== Vision 2025 ==
The Vision 2025 is the country's long–term development blueprint which aims to create a globally competitive and prosperous country providing a high quality of life for all its citizens. Mr. Ahsan Iqbal, Minister Planning and Dr. M. Nadeem Javaid, advisor to Minister prepared Vision 2025 by carrying out wider consultations with line ministries, provincial governments, civil society and business community. National Economic Council approved it in July 2014, subsequently a PSDP Project was created named "High Impact Initiative of Vision 2025" to implement it across the various tiers of the Government. Dr. Asif Chishti from Harvard University was called in to lead as Director General owing to his diverse experience in corporate and public sector in over 96 countries and territories.

=== Priority Areas ===
- Integrated Energy
- Modernization of Infrastructure
- Institutional reform and modernization of the public sector
- Value-addition in Commodity Producing Sectors
- Export promotion
- Water and food security
- Private sector-led growth and entrepreneurship

== Pakistan Institute of Development Economics ==
The Pakistan Institute of Development Economics, is a post-graduate research institute, and a public policy think tank located in the vicinity of Islamabad, Pakistan.

== Pakistan Planning and Management Institute ==
The Pakistan Planning and Management Institute (PPMI) is one of the divisions of the Planning Commission. The main objectives of PPMI are to improve technical and analytical skills and enhance expertise of the federal, provincial and district governments’ officers through training in areas of Project Management, Social development and application of Information Technology in Project management.

== Federal Drought Emergency Relief Assistance (DERA) Unit ==
The function of DERA Unit is to facilitate the implementation of the project in the drought-hit areas of all the four provinces and coordinate activities carried out in the provinces to mitigate the effects of drought.

== See also ==
- Five-year plans of Pakistan
- Ministry of Planning and Development
