= Rahon =

- Town
- Location in Punjab, India
- Coordinates: 31.05°N 76.12°E
- Country: India
- State: Punjab
- District: Shaheed Bhagat Singh Nagar
- Elevation: 250 m (820 ft)

Population (2011)
  - Total: 15,676

Languages
  - Official: Punjabi
- Time zone: UTC+5:30 (IST)
- PIN: 144517
- Vehicle registration: PB-32

Rahon is a town and a municipal council in the district Shaheed Bhagat Singh Nagar of the Indian state of Punjab. Rahon is in Doaba region of Punjab. Doaba also known as Bist Doab, is the region of Punjab, India that lies between the Beas River and the Sutlej River. A famous battle was fought here between Sikhs and Mughals i.e Battle of Rahon (1710).

Rahon is situated on the - Jaijon line of the Northern railway, Rahon is 7 km from Nawanshahr, the tahsil/subdivision headquarters, and 65 km from Jalandhar, the district headquarters. It is also connected by road with Nawashahr (8 km), Jadla (12 km), Ludhiana (51 km), and Phillaur (37 km), Machhiwara (18 km).

People of Doaba region are given the demonym "Doabia". The dialect of Punjabi spoken in Doaba is called "Doabi". The term "Doaba" or "Doab" is derived from Persian "دو آب" (do āb "two water") meaning "land of two rivers".

== Name ==
Rahon is a changed name, it was Raghupur until the 12th century. Raj pal changed its name from Raghupur to Rahon after a certain lady called Raho. Some contemporaries had written that it was considered unlucky to speak of Rahon by its proper name, in the morning, when fasting. According to them, until breakfast Rahon should be referred to as 'Zanana shahr', or 'Women town'.

== Ancient city ==
Rahon is an ancient city, it is one of the oldest continuously inhabited cities in India. The city face had withstood the ravages of time, invaders, lootings, epidemics, and an unfortunate case of bypass of the silk route. Ruins there speaks the sad story and tell the city once had great significance. it was formed like a fort with four gates, Delhi Gate, Lahori Gate, Pahar Singh Gate, and Ropri Gate.

== Highlights ==
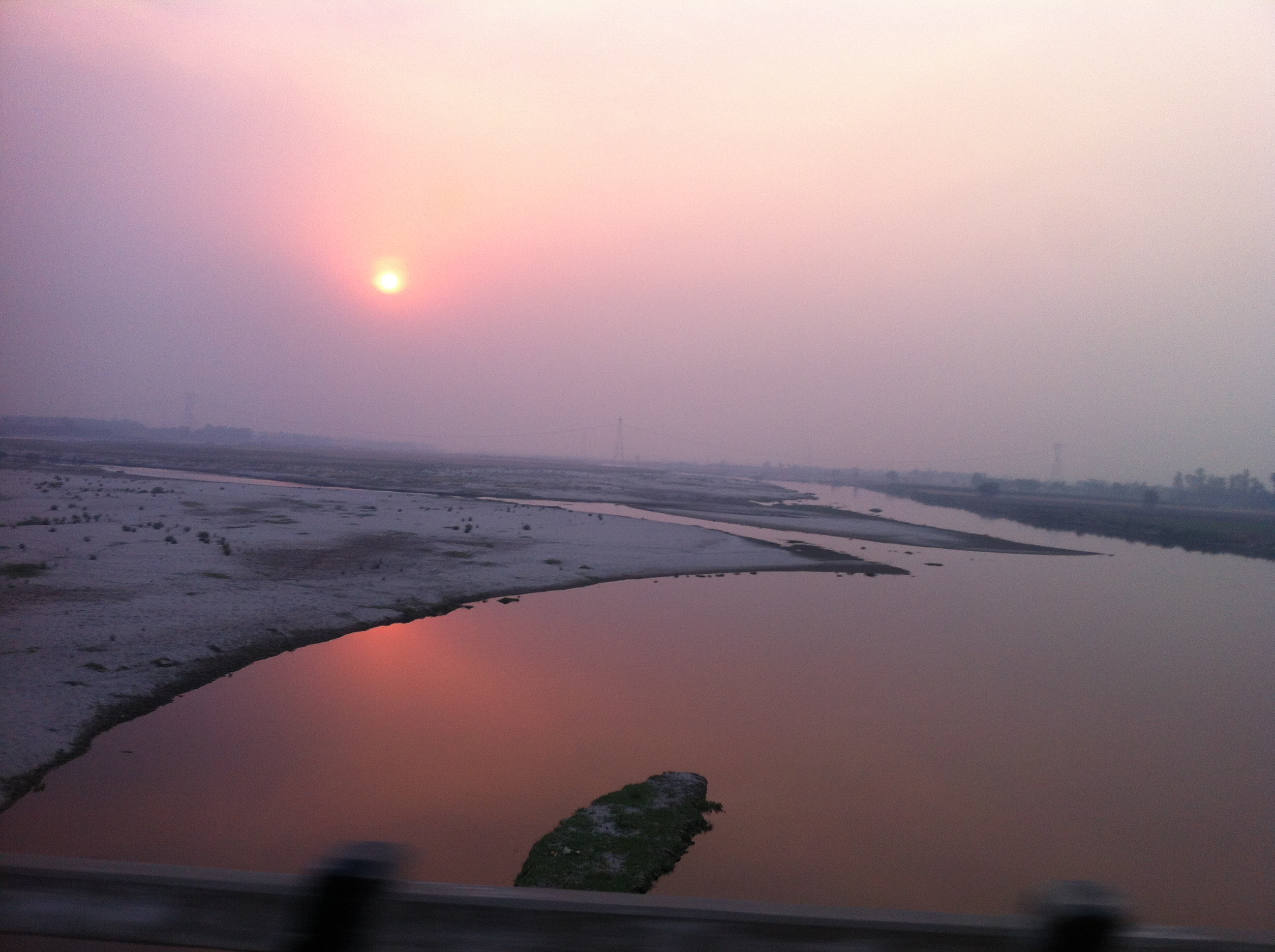
Sutlej river

- The town is near the banks of Sutlej river.
- Silk Road Rahon's importance was most apparent in its position on the ancient trade route to Tibet and Central Asia (Silk route), and it began to decline once a new route was discovered through Kabul during the Mughal era.
- In Akbar's time who was the third Mughal emperor, (1556-1605 AD) Rahon was the capital of the Dardhak Mahal.
- In Shah Jahan, the fifth Mughal emperor time, a Sarai was built at Rahon on the Sutlej river's western bank. Shah Jahan chose Rahon because of its strategic location on the Sutlej bank (for his convenience in using ferry) and considering the commanding route by road of Agra, Delhi, and Lahore. This route was famous with the name ''the long walk''.
- In Aurangzeb reign, the sixth Mughal emperor (1658-1707AD), a brick fort was built at Rahon.
- There was an oldest market (Mandi) with more than 600 shops.
- Rahon was famous for the trade of sugar, shoemaking, manufacturing various cotton fabrics, and Gota. etc.
- Rahon was a flourishing trading center with lots of trading opportunities, having population (145000) more than Jallandhar.
- Rahon was on the trading route to Tibet and central Asia.
- Battle of Rahon (1710) which is closely associated with Banda Singh Bahadur is one of the great historical event.
- Rahon was a Headquarter of one of the territories seized by Maharaja Ranjit Singh. Rahon was the capital of Dallewalia Misl.

== The reasons for decline ==
Rahon faced a gradual decline in its economy and population for various reasons; some of the major ones are listed below

1. Invaders and battles one after another.
2. Diversion of the trade route caused major dent in decline of the Rahon.
3. Epidemics.

== History ==
Rahon was also among the 50 most populous cities in the world for many centuries, particularly in the period between 52 B.C.-1750 A.D.. After that period, Rahon started witnessing gradual decline due to epidemics, attacks from foreign invaders, and a reduction in merchant activity when the silk route began to bypass Rahon in favor of Kabul. Rahon had Asia's oldest mandi bazaar (now ruined) situated at the city's Delhi gate. The bazaar was famous for its variety and quality of products, including spices, weapons, apparel, and footwear. Rahon's population also declined due to outbreaks of malaria, the immigration of a large proportion of its Muslim population to Pakistan during partition, and civilian casualties resulting from attacks by outside invaders. Rahon has the oldest Government High School in the Punjab state, which was constructed in 1857.

=== Founding ===
Rahon was founded 2000 years ago by Raja Raghab, a Brahmin ruler, who named it Raghupur, which continued to be called in correspondence by the Pandits of the city until the twentieth century.

- 1206 AD The city came into the possession of Gujars, who were eventually driven out by the Mahtons (Rajputs), who in turn succumbed to the Ghorewaha Rajputs, whose conquest of the country is put down as having occurred in the time of Muhammad Ghori (d. 1206 AD).
- 1517-1526 AD In the time of Ibrahim Lodhi (1517-1526 AD), the city was reported to have a population of 145,000 and was a flourishing trading center on the route to Tibet and Central Asia.
- 1556-1605 AD Toward the beginning of the Mughal period, the town was occupied by the Ghorewaha Raja of Machhiwara, Rana Udho. He actively assisted Akbar (1556-1605 AD). During his fight for the Delhi throne, he defeated and captured the rebellion leader Bairam Khan. As a reward, the Raja allowed Rana to retain the jagir of Rahon. In Akbar's time, Rahon was the capital of the Dardhak Mahal and gave its name to one of the two tarafs into which the mahal was divided. In Aurangzeb's reign (1658-1707 AD) a brick fort was built here. The Rajputs of Rahon were Chaudhris and men of much influence during the period of Muhammadan rule.

=== Medieval to present ===
- 1710 AD In 1710 AD, Rahon was conquered by Banda Singh Bahadur after defeating mughals in the Battle of Rahon.The Sikh movement signified a protest against the beneficiaries of the existing structure of authority. The Sikhs issued orders to chaudhries, muqaddams, and qanungos of Rahon and the adjacent parganas calling upon them to surrender. All were asked to follow the terms to which the peasants agreed to work accordingly and extended their helping hand to Banda Singh Bahadur. Henceforth, on the economic plane, Banda Singh Bahadur could be given credit for introducing revenue reforms in Punjab, was a remarkable contribution of Banda Singh Bahadur, which was later improved upon by Maharaja Ranjit Singh.
- Capital of Dhallewalia Misl

Detail of the Dallewalia Misl
SN	Name	Founding Clan	Capital	Key Leaders	Strength in Regular Horseman (1780)	Misl Period Territory by 1759	Corresponding Current Area
1	Dallewalia Misl	Khatri & kang	Rahon	Sardar Gulab Singh khatri and Sardar Tara Singh Kang Ghaiba	5,000	Nakodar, Talwan, Badala, Rahon, Phillaur, Ludhiana etc.	Ludhiana district, Jalandhar district

- Later, Rahon fell back again into the hands of the Mughals.
- 1759 AD, In 1759 AD, Rahon was seized by Dhallewali Confederacy Sikhs led by Tara Singh kang Ghaiba, he took 75% of property from Ghorewahs by force and left 25% for then He controlled considerable territory on both sides of the Sutlej river. Rahon was the headquarters, remained in their possession until Tara Singh's death, when it was added to Maharaja Ranjit Singh's dominions. However, Pandits continued to dominate local politics. Pandit Sardars ran the city's administration for centuries.
- After the collapse of the Sikh Empire, the descendants of the Rana of Rahon came to prominence again. Chaudhry Abdul Hameed Khan of Rahon and the Rana of Rahon, Chaudhry Jang Baz Khan elder brother of Chaudhry Abdul Rehman Khan made significant strides. Chaudhry Abdul Rehman Khan Rana of Rahon served as a member of the Legislative Assembly of Punjab from the Unionist Party before Indian Independence.
- 1947 Until Partition the Muslim Rana of Rahon and the Rajrana of Jadla controlled most of the estates, however after partition the Rana of Rahon migrated to Pakistan, first moving to Sahiwal and later settling in Rehamanabad Khanqa Dogran. After Partition, Pandit Buta Ram Qasir Jagirdar continued to serve as Municipal Councilor and local leader of Rahon for next two and half decades. Pandit Buta Ram's father Sansar Chand was Zaildar of the region.

Rahon is an old city and it overlooks the low valley of the Satluj, it held social, economic, and political significance during various periods of history. This significance stemmed primarily from the city's location along the ancient trade route to Tibet and Central Asia and it began to fade in importance as soon as a new route through Kabul was opened during Mughal times. Further, Rahon's proximity to marshes made it a victim of periodic large-scale outbreaks of malaria. Over time, the city's population declined greatly, falling to 69,000 when the British took over after the First Anglo Sikh War in 1846 and falling further to 6,607 by 1971. After the division of the country in 1947, the Muslim population of Rahon was uprooted to Pakistan, with most settling in Faisalabad and Rahwali.

- Present Rahon: is a small city divided into 13 wards and operates under a municipality's legislative body . It has total administration over 3,260 houses, arranges basic amenities like water and sewerage. The Municipal council authorizes building roads within Municipal Council limits and imposing taxes on properties coming under its jurisdiction.
- Government School: The oldest school in Punjab is in Rahon. The British founded the school in 1855, in an old fort building that marked the last border of "Maharaja Ranjit Singh's Lahore Durbar." A number of notable alumni include Mr. Balbir Singh (AIS), who retired as the Chief Secretary of the Andaman and Nicobar Islands, Sardar Dilbagh Singh, who served as Air Chief Marshal, Durga Das, BR Chopra, and others. The school was administered by Zaildar Sansar Chand and later by Pandit Buta Ram, who served as Head Master from 1924 till 1958.
- Hierarchy of the city administration: It is a Class-III municipality. Sardar Amarjit Singh Johal is the President Municipal Council of the city. And MLA of the area is Mr. Nachhatar Pal. Rahon is under the Anandpur Sahib Lok Sabha Constituency, for that MP is Mr. Manish Tewari.
- Demographics: As per the census 2011, the population of Rahon was 15676 in which there are 52,74% (8,267) males, and 47.26% (7,409) are females; Literacy rate of Rahon city is 80.12%, which is higher than the state average of 75.84%, Male literacy rate is around 83.84% while female literacy rate is 75.95%. The report data suggests a population of Children with ages of 0-6 is 1771, which is 11.30% of the total population of Rahon. The female Sex Ratio is 896 against the state average of 895. Moreover, the Child Sex Ratio in Rahon is around 910 compared to the Punjab state average of 846.

=== Notable people ===
- B. R. Chopra Indian film director (22 April 1914 – 5 November 2008).
- Chaudhry Abdul Hameed Khan was Home Secretary in Pakistan
- Chaudhry Abdul Rehman Khan was the Rana of Rahon Jagir and Member of the Punjab Legislative Assembly.
- Mohammed Zahur Khayyam Indian music director and composer (18 February 1927 – 19 August 2019)
- Amrish Puri, Bollywood actor was born here
- Dilbagh Singh was Air Chief Marshal awarded with PVSM, AVSM, VM, was the head of the Indian Air Force from 1981 to 1984, as Chief of the Air Staff. He was the second Sikh to hold that position.

== Trade and manufacturing ==
Rahon was noted for its sugar trade, shoemaking, 'gota' making and even textile manufacturing. The town missed all these crafts, activities, and exports with several disasters and many adverse circumstances.

=== Sugar ===
Sugar trade was one of the famous commercial activity at Rahon.

=== Textiles and exports ===
The town then was sharing a trade route to Tibet and Central Asia, which was favorable for exporting activities but a new route through Kabul was opened during Mughal times. The exports via Jammu, Leh, and present Afghanistan is recorded. Rahon was known for cotton cloth manufacturing and its exports. Many distinguished weave structures ranging from coarse varieties to fine textures were eminent. Bafta, Ghati, and Khasa were the kinds that were used to export.

==== Bafta ====
Rahon was a textile manufacturing hub especially for cotton clothes during ancient times (18th century), it was known for many textile varieties one of them was Bafta cloth which is a closed plain weave structure. The material was found in many variants, coarse to fine.

==== Ghati ====
Rahon had an expertise for Ghati which is a highly glazed cotton long-cloth of fine texture also called ''ghatti''. It was a superior quality cloth and expensive also. The fabric was affordable by rich persons only. The average price of printed cotton was ten annas per square yard. Production of ''Ghati'' was ceased by the close of the nineteenth century.

==== Khasa ====
Rahon was also producing Khasa, the fabric then was known ''Rahon Khasa'' . It was a fine cotton cloth.

==== Khaddar ====
Rahon was famous for its trading route and manufacturing certain cotton-made clothes such as Khes, Khaddar with coarse cotton, with various colorful stripe and checked patterns.

==== Lungi ====
Lungi fabric was also made in Rahon. It was continue even after ceasing down the Ghati cloth in close of 19th century. And then slowly the labor migrated to the industrial city Ludhiana.

=== Gota ===
Gota is a narrow imitation of gold and silver ribbons used on edges of many bridal clothes, dresses and dupattas for embellishing purpose. It was also manufactured and exported from Rahon.

=== Shoe making ===
Rahon was known for the art of shoe making which attained a high degree of skill and a pair prepared by one Mian Khaki Shah of Rahon is said to still be on exhibit in a museum at Lahore, Pakistan.

== Historical remains ==
This piece of land has blessings of many Saints, Guru's, Peer's and Faquir's. Rahon has several religious places like many ancient temples, gurudwaras, mosques, sufi shrines, yogi places. There are ruins of old building structures such as Havelis ( with smaller bricks, very small than regular size). There are some remains of historical interest.

- Suraj Kund : An old Sarovar (Pool) and a temple Suraj Kund. It is situated in the south direction. According to a myth in all over India there are only two and a half kunds, from which one is in Rahon, half in Haridwar and one in Nasik.
- Panch Tirthian.
- Shri Ram sarowar, adjoining the samadhis of Tara Singh Ghaibha and his brave widow . And samadhi of Rana Udho.
- Shrine Baba Roshan Shah Wali.
- Delhi Gate. The ruins of the Delhi gate are still there.
- Shri Kirpal sagar: Symbolizing unity of all religions. It is a place near to Rahon, village Dariapur, it is open to all people irrespective of caste, colour, creed, or nationality.

== Gallery ==
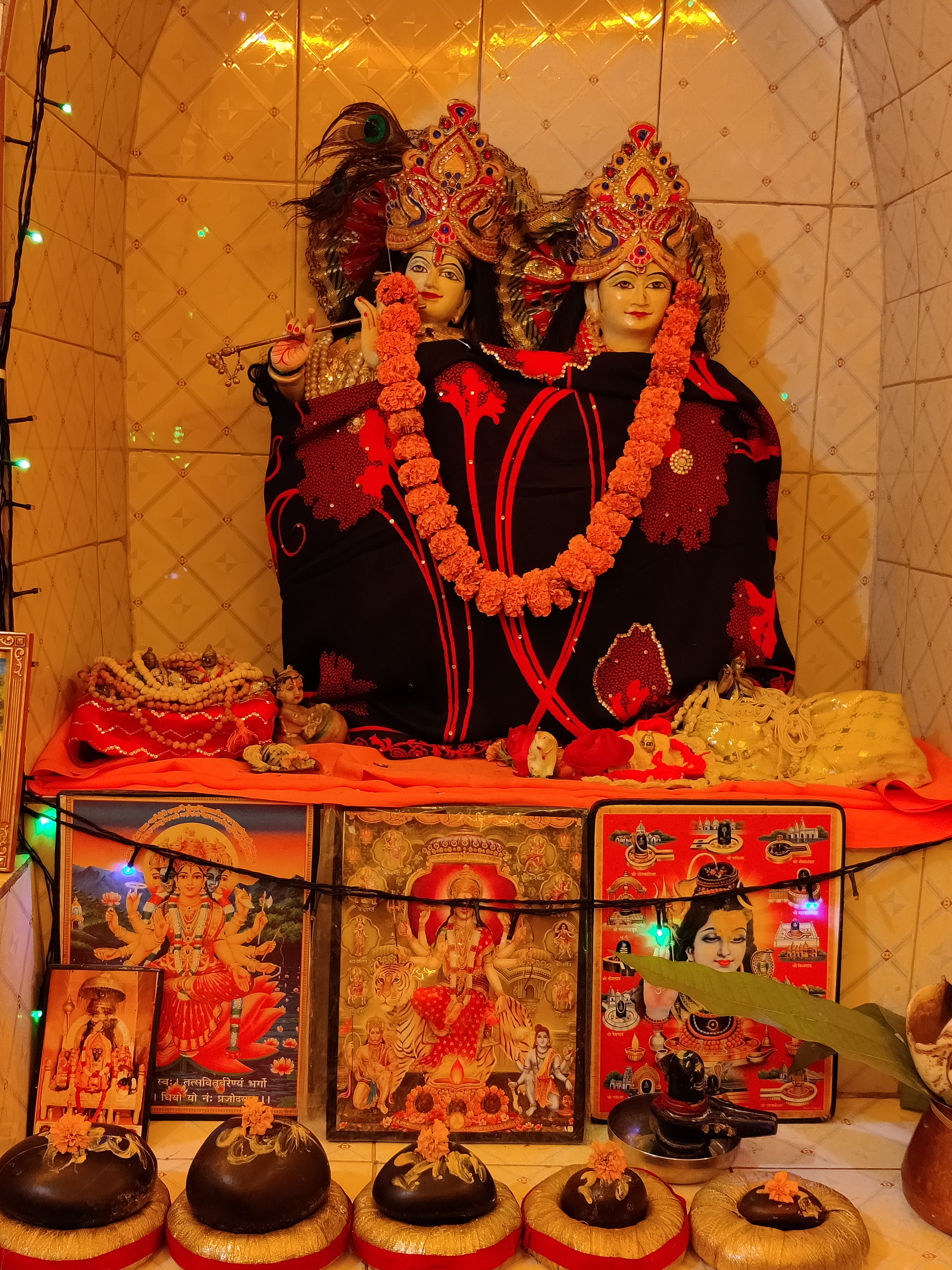
Ramsar temple Rahon

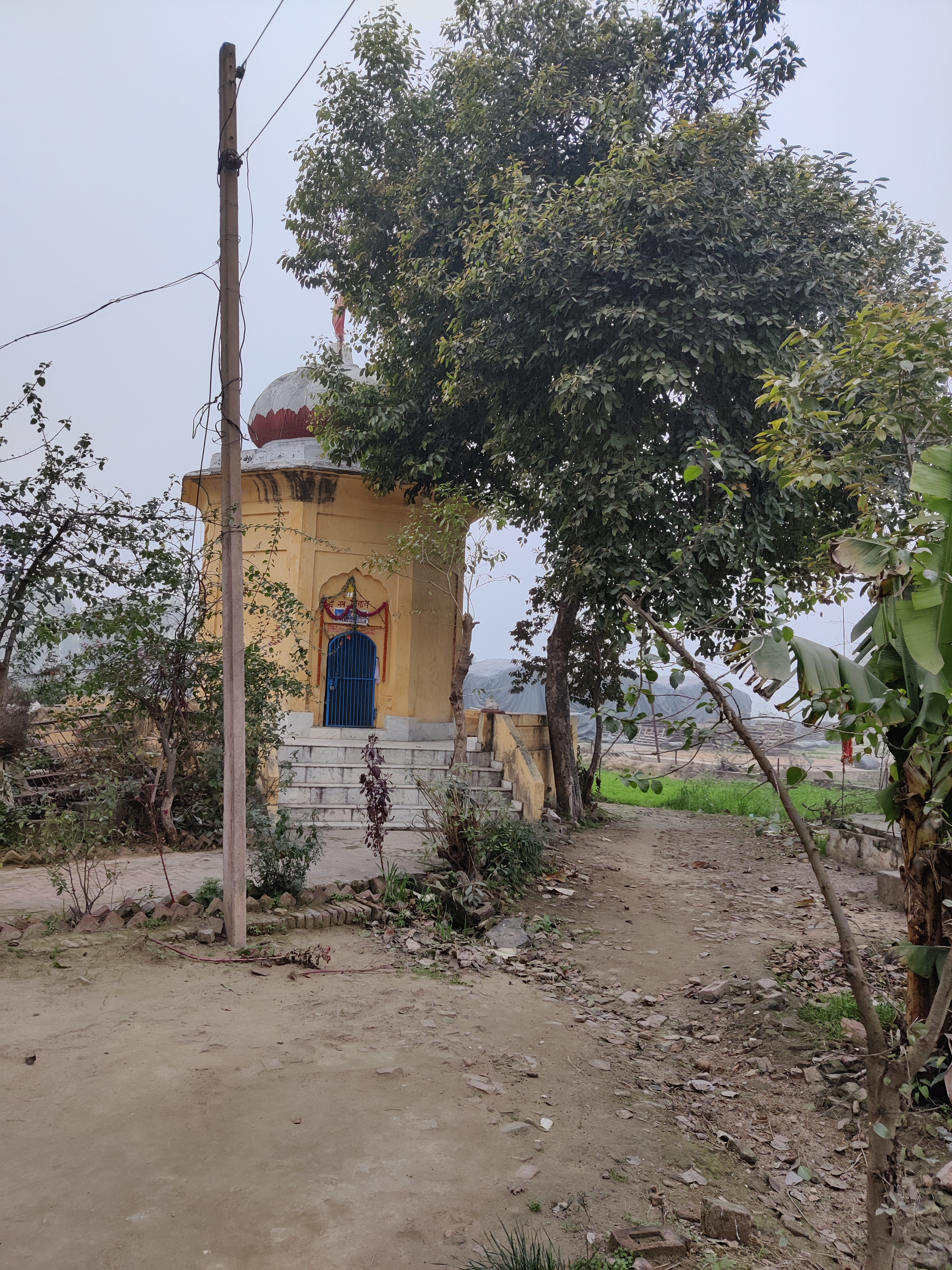
Dera Ramsar temple Rahon..

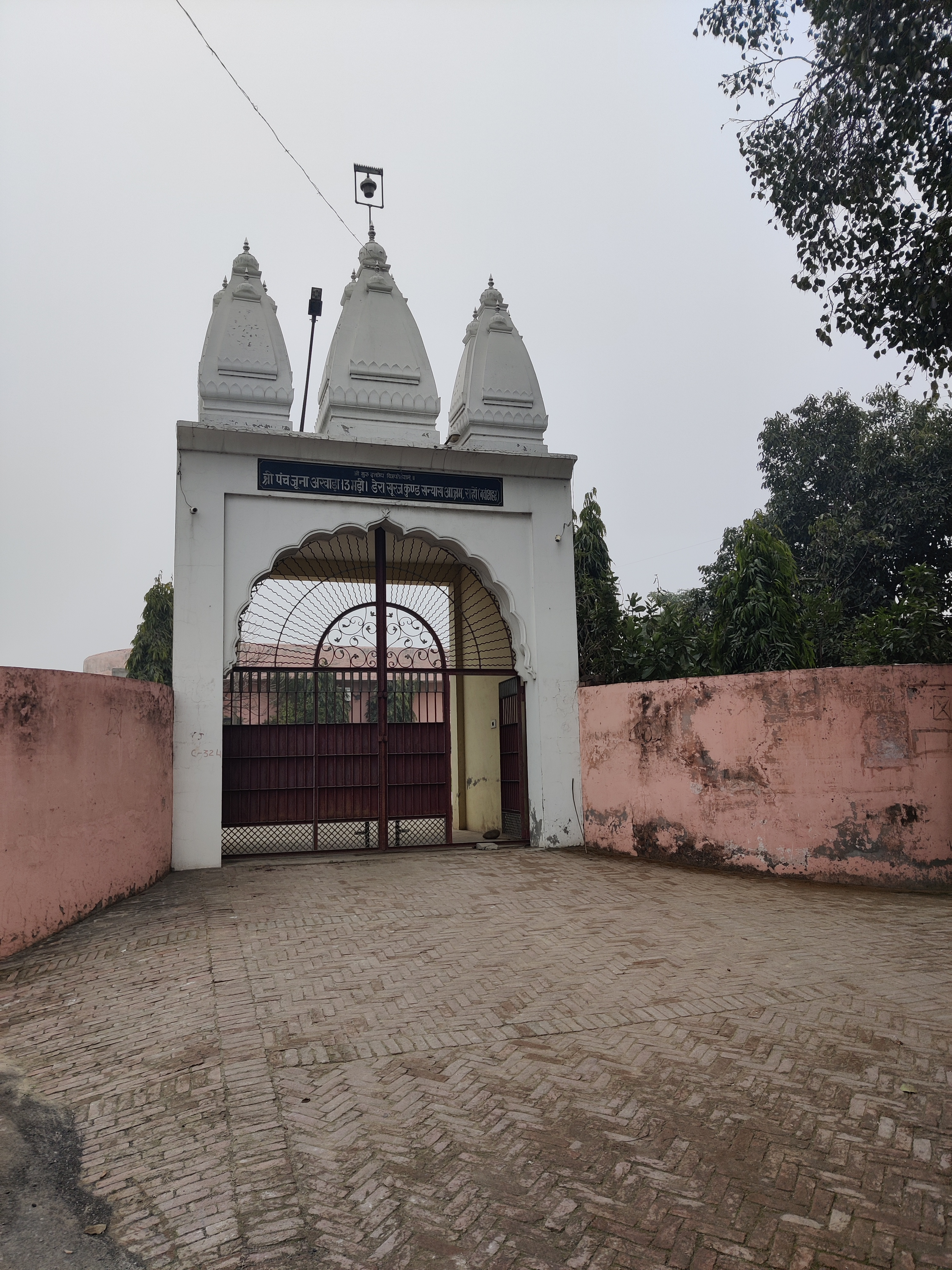
Dera Suraj Kund, Rahon

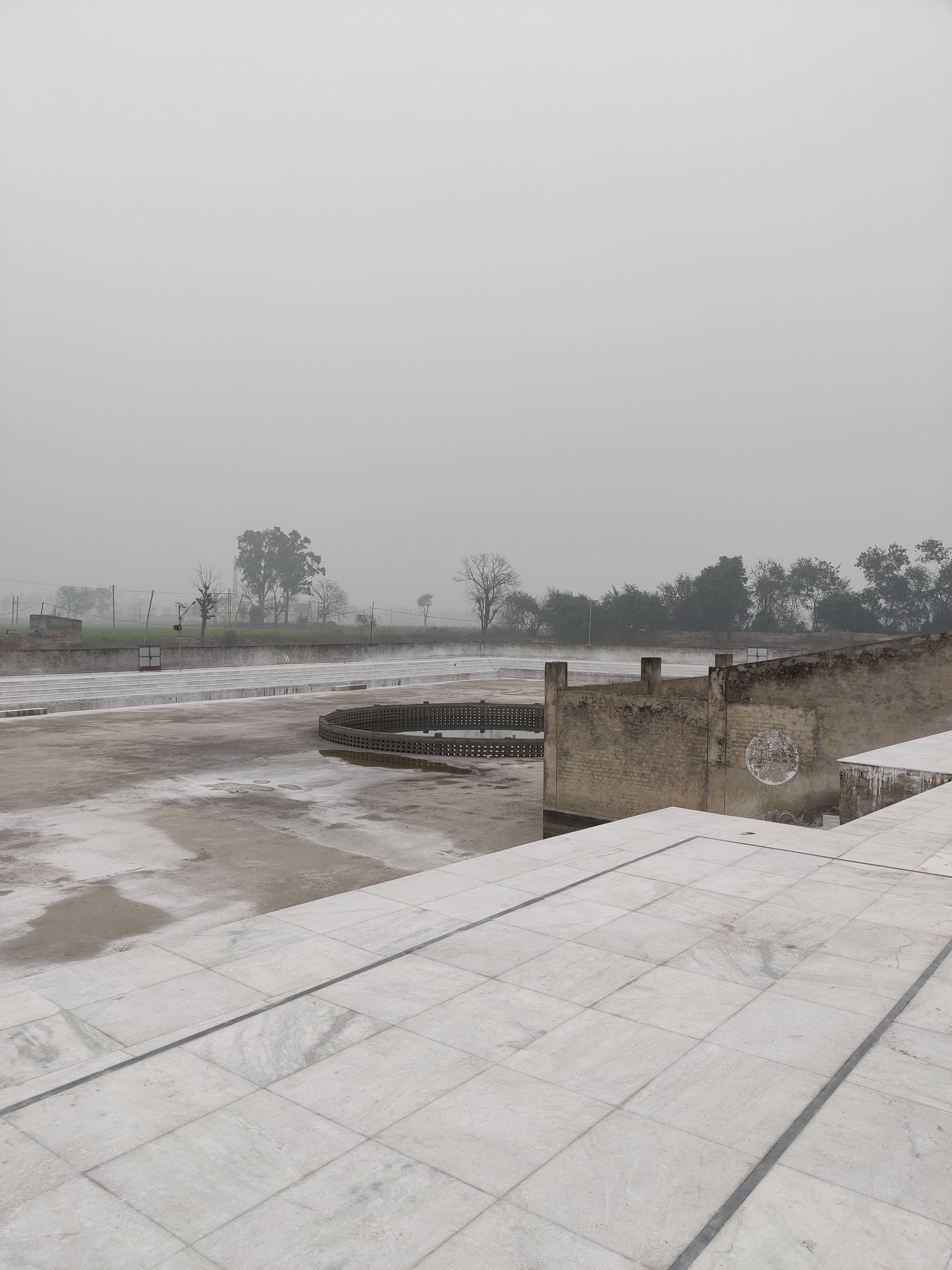
Sarovar (Pool) Suraj Kund Rahon

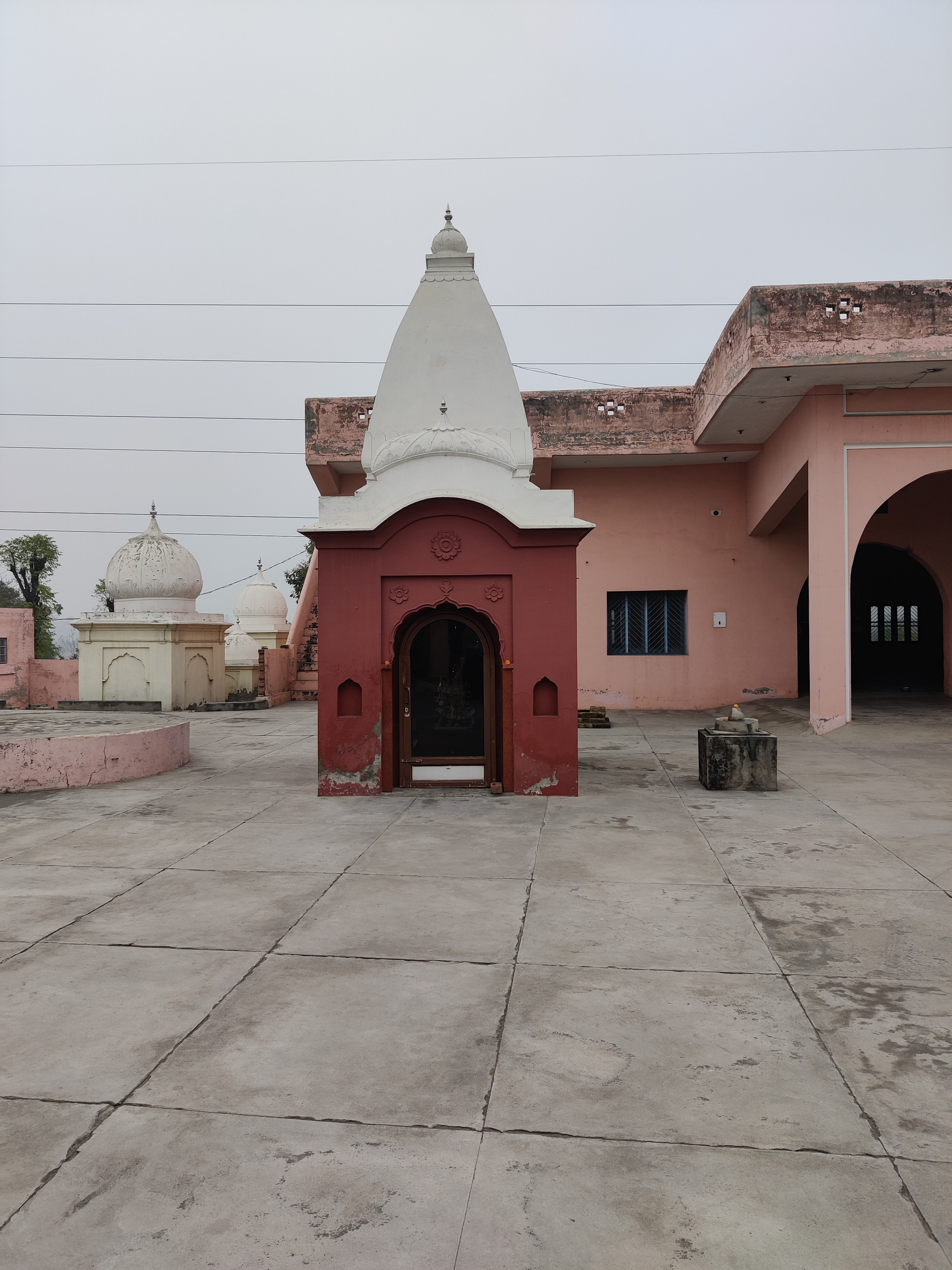
Suraj Kund Rahon.

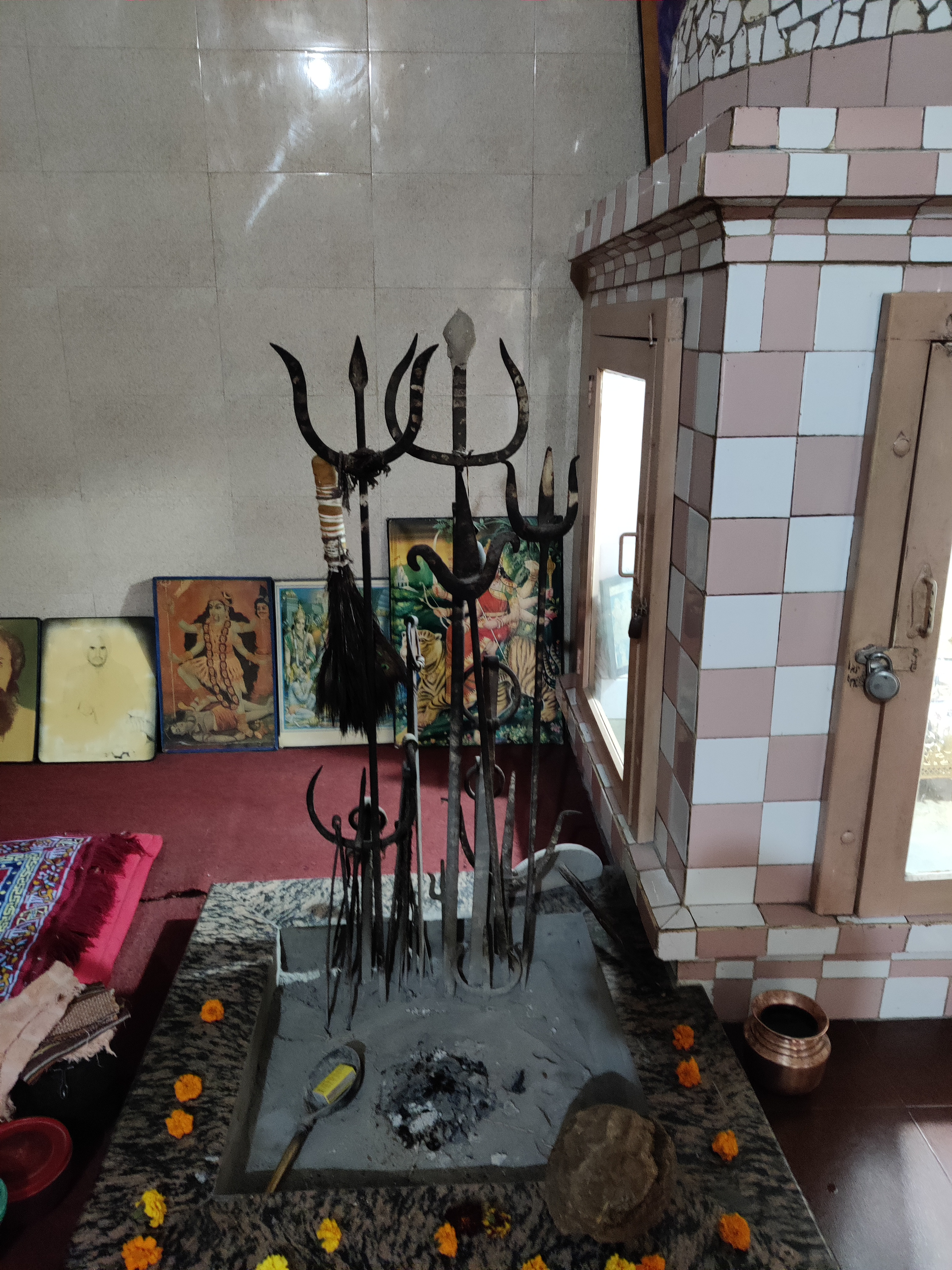
Dera Suraj Kund.

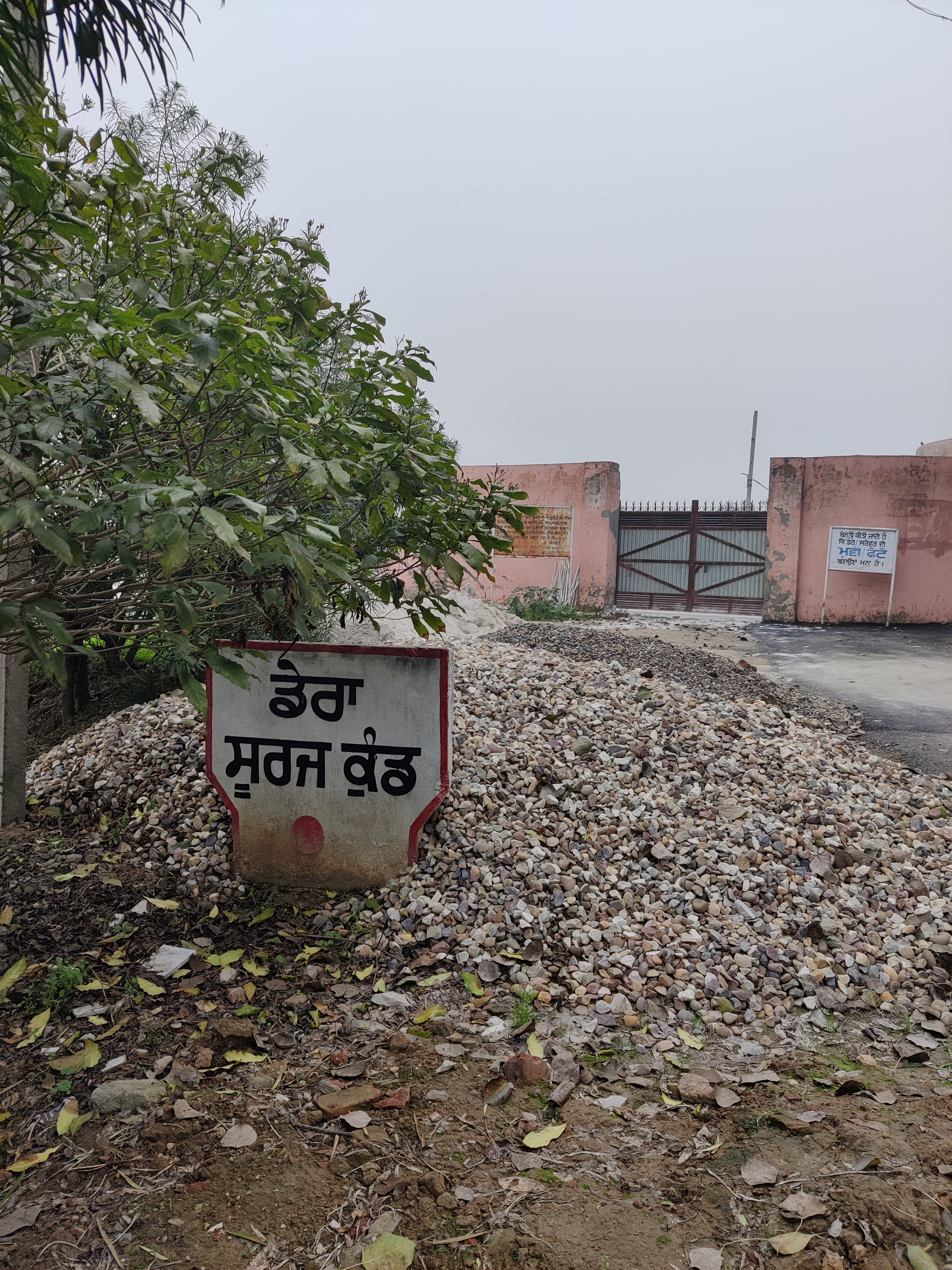
Dera Suraj Kund Rahon..

== See also ==
- Battle of Rahon (1710)
- Tara Singh Ghaiba
