= Siege of Ram Rauni =

- Part of Mughal–Sikh conflicts
Date	October 1748-Maghar 1805 Bk./November 1748
Location	Ram Rauni, Amritsar
Result	Mughal: mughals granted one-fourth of the revenue of Pargana Patti and revenue from villages of Guru Chak

Belligerents
Mughal Empire; Subah of Lahore	Sikh Confederacy

Commanders and leaders
Mir Mannu; Adina Beg Khan; Sadiq Beg Khan; Diwan Kaura Mal; Mirza Aziz Khan; Bakhshi Nasir Ali Khan Jalandri; Jassa Singh Ramgarhia	Jai Singh Kanhaiya; Jassa Singh Ramgarhia

Strength
Large with artillery	About 500 Sikhs

Casualties and losses
Unknown	About 200 Sikhs killed during the siege

The Siege of Ram Rauni was a siege of the Sikh fort of Ram Rauni at Amritsar in 1748 by forces of the Mughal forces under Mir Mannu, with Adina Beg Khan and other officers involved in the operations. The fort had been built after a Khalsa assembly at Amritsar on Baisakhi, 30 March 1747, and was designed as a small fortified position near Ramsar with space for about 500 men.

The siege began after the Sikhs gathered at Amritsar for Diwali in October 1748. About 500 Sikhs entered Ram Rauni, while other Sikh groups concealed themselves near Ramsar to support the garrison. The Mughal army attempted to reduce the fort through siege operations and mining, but the garrison resisted until political and military pressures forced Mir Mannu to lift the siege. The settlement granted the Sikhs one-fourth of the revenue of Pargana Patti and released revenue from villages of Guru Chak.

== Background ==
After the conflict between the sons of Zakariya Khan, Shahnawaz Khan defeated his elder brother Yahiya Khan, along with Diwan Lakhpat Rai and Mir Mumin Khan, and imprisoned them. Shahnawaz Khan appointed Kaura Mal as his diwan and confirmed Adina Beg Khan as faujdar of the Jullundur Doab. Kaura Mal was a Khulasa Sikh, while Adina Beg Khan favoured a policy of accommodation with the Sikhs.

The Sikhs suspended plundering activity during this period, partly because Kaura Mal held high authority and partly because they needed time to recover after earlier disturbances. The government of Shahnawaz Khan was not yet stable, and Kaura Mal and Adina Beg Khan advised that the Sikhs should be left undisturbed.

=== Construction of Ram Rauni ===
On Baisakhi, 30 March 1747, the Sikhs assembled at Amritsar and celebrated the festival after a long period of disturbance. A general assembly of the Khalsa passed a gurmata to build a fort at Amritsar. The decision provided work for Sikhs who did not wish to return home and reflected uncertainty about how long peace with the provincial government would last.

Amritsar was close to Lahore and lay on the Grand Trunk Road, but it was chosen because of its religious importance, its position in the Majha, the surrounding forest, the support of the local population and its usefulness for monitoring Lahore. The foundation was laid near Ramsar, about 3 km from the Hari Mandir. The Sikhs dug a foundation about two metres wide, began all four walls at once, and made provision for gates and towers. A deep and wide ditch was also excavated around the fort.

The fort was named Ram Rauni, meaning God's shelter. It was a small mud-built fort with accommodation for about 500 men. The scale of the work was limited to avoid provoking government officials, and the fort resembled a fortified zamindar's house surrounded by cultivated fields. After its completion, the Sikhs beautified the temple and tank, and Hari Singh Bhangi was allowed to establish residential quarters near the tank.

== Siege ==
The rainy season halted further operations from July to September 1748. During this period the Sikhs avoided direct disturbance of the government and limited their activity to the submontane area north of the Bari and Jullundur Doabs. In October 1748, on Diwali, the Sikhs again gathered at Amritsar to bathe, pray, illuminate the site and make offerings at the Hari Mandir.

Muin-ul-Mulk had banned Sikh entry into Amritsar. He marched on the city after the Diwali gathering. About 500 Sikhs took shelter inside Ram Rauni, while other Sikh groups hid in the neighbouring jungle and bushes near Ramsar to assist the garrison if needed.

Adina Beg Khan joined the siege under orders from Mir Mannu. Preparations for the siege were also made with Sadiq Beg Khan, while forces of Diwan Kaura Mal, Mirza Aziz Khan, Bakhshi Nasir Ali Khan Jalandri and the hill kings attacked Ram Rauni under Mir Mannu's orders.

=== Siege operations ===
The Mughal army had artillery and a considerable supply of arms and ammunition. The besiegers planned to blow up Ram Rauni by filling underground tunnels with gunpowder. The Sikh defenders dug a deep moat and took positions in it, preventing the advance of the tunnels.

Daily skirmishes took place during the siege. The defenders inside the fort made occasional night sorties, while the Sikh groups outside harassed the besieging forces from nearby cover. The siege is described as lasting about three months from October to December 1748. About 200 Sikhs of the garrison were killed.

The garrison suffered shortages of food and fodder. Jai Singh Kanhaiya is credited with bringing provisions into the fort from the enemy commissariat and returning over the walls. In extreme distress, the besieged prepared to rush out and die fighting.

=== Jassa Singh Ramgarhia's defection ===
Jassa Singh Ichogillia, also named Jassa Singh Thoka, was then in the service of Adina Beg Khan. The besieged Sikhs appealed to him to leave Adina Beg Khan's side and help them. He had been outside the Khalsa brotherhood for killing his daughter. In response to the appeal, he deserted Adina Beg Khan and entered Ram Rauni at night. He entered with a hundred followers. His entry strengthened the garrison.

=== Negotiations and lifting of the siege ===
Jassa Singh Ahluwalia sent a message to Diwan Kaura Mal that the garrison could be saved through his intervention. Kaura Mal then urged Mir Mannu to settle subsistence arrangements for the Sikhs, arguing that they could be pacified by such a measure. Adina Beg Khan opposed leniency, but Mir Mannu accepted Kaura Mal's advice.

The wider political situation also favoured ending the siege. Shah Nawaz Khan, the former governor of Punjab, occupied Multan and prepared to advance toward Lahore, while news also arrived of the expected second invasion of Ahmad Shah Durrani. Kaura Mal advised that the siege should be lifted, Mir Mannu should prepare to resist Durrani, and Kaura Mal should proceed against Shah Nawaz Khan at Multan.

Mir Mannu granted one-fourth of the land revenue of Pargana Patti to Sri Darbar Sahib, Amritsar, as a jagir. He also released revenue from a dozen villages of Guru Chak. The siege was lifted in Maghar 1805 Bk./November 1748, and Mir Mannu's forces returned to Lahore to prepare for campaigns against Ahmad Shah Durrani and Shah Nawaz Khan of Multan. The fort was demolished after the siege was raised.

== Aftermath ==
Kaura Mal took a number of Sikhs into his pay and treated them with indulgence. As a believer of the Guru, he paid the Sikhs a fine of Rs. 5 per day for smoking. The settlement created a temporary improvement in relations between the Sikhs and the Subah of Punjab. The Sikhs adopted a quieter course for a time and waited for another opportunity to advance their objectives.

In September or October 1749, Mir Mannu prepared to move against Shah Nawaz Khan and sent a campaign under the overall command of Diwan Kaura Mal. Shah Nawaz Khan was supported by Baloches of the southwest, Bahawalpur, Mankotia and the Sials.

== Bibliography ==
- Gandhi, Surjit Singh (1999). Sikhs in the Eighteenth Century: Their Struggle for Survival and Supremacy. Singh Bros. ISBN 9788172052171.
- Gupta, Hari Ram (1999). History of the Sikhs: Evolution of Sikh Confederacies, 1708–1769. History of the Sikhs. Vol. 2 (3rd, illustrated ed.). Munshiram Manoharlal Publishers. ISBN 9788121502481.
- Gupta, Hari Ram (1982). History of the Sikhs: The Sikh Commonwealth or Rise and Fall of Sikh Misls. History of the Sikhs. Vol. 4 (3rd ed.). Munshiram Manoharlal.
- Singh, Ganda (1990). Sardar Jassa Singh Ahluwalia. Publication Bureau, Punjabi University.
- Singh, Teja; Singh, Ganda (1989). A Short History of the Sikhs: 1469–1765. Vol. 1. Publication Bureau, Punjabi University. ISBN 9788173800078.
