= Battle of Lahore (1748) =

Durrani-Mughal battle in 1748

- Part of the Indian campaign of Ahmad Shah Durrani
Date	11 January 1748
Location	Lahore, Subah of Lahore, Mughal Empire (present-day Pakistan)
Result	Mughal Victory

Belligerents
Durrani Empire	Mughal Empire

Commanders and leaders
Ahmad Shah Durrani; Jahan Khan	Shah Nawaz; Kaura Mal; Adina Beg Khan; Asmatullah Khan †; Lachin Beg; Jalhe Khan

Units involved
18,000	70,000; Numerous artillery

The Battle of Lahore was fought between Afghan forces of the Durrani Empire under Ahmad Shah Durrani and Mughal forces under Shah Nawaz on 11 January 1748. Zakriya Khan, the Mughal Governor of Lahore, died in 1745 and was succeeded by his son, Yahya Khan. Yahya Khan's governorship over Lahore was soon challenged by his brother, Shah Nawaz, who was the governor of Multan. This resulted in a war between the two brothers, lasting from November 1746 to March 1747. Shah Nawaz won the war then usurped the governorship of Lahore.

Shah Nawaz used his captive brother as a bargaining tool in order to get recognition from the Delhi government. However, following Yahya Khan's escape from captivity, Shah Nawaz sought help from abroad. He turned to Ahmad Shah Durrani, who had just taken the city of Kabul from the Mughals. Ahmad Shah agreed to assist him, and left Peshawar in December 1747, beginning his first invasion of India. However, Shah Nawaz then changed his allegiance back to the Mughals, and met the Afghans for battle at Lahore.

Despite being overwhelmingly outnumbered and without artillery, Ahmad Shah won the battle and the Afghans entered Lahore, looting parts of the city. Ahmad Shah remained in the city until he began marching to Delhi, where he was intercepted by the Mughals and resulting in the Battle of Manupur.

== Background ==
Following the death of Zakariya Khan, the governor of Lahore, in July 1745, the Mughal Wazier Qamaruddin Khan appointed the former’s two sons as governors of Lahore and Multan. Yahya Khan was appointed governor of Lahore, and Shah Nawaz was appointed governor of Multan. Yahya Khan's administration was challenged by his brother, who soon arrived in Lahore in November 1746. Shah Nawaz demanded an equal division of their dead father's property. This dispute resulted in a war between the two brothers which lasted from November 1746 to March 1747.

On 17 March 1747, Shah Nawaz defeated Yahya Khan and held him in captivity. Shah Nawaz usurped the governorship of Lahore, appointed Kaura Mal as his diwan, and recognized Adina Beg Khan as faujdar of the Jalandhar Doaba. Shah Nawaz began negotiating with the Delhi government to secure its recognition of his governorship, and using his captive brother as a bargaining tool. However, the Mughal emperor Muhammad Shah threatened direct military action against Shah Nawaz, and Yahya Khan escaped from Shah Nawaz's captivity and fled towards Delhi. Shah Nawaz soon began looking for foreign help. Shah Nawaz had heard of the military exploits of Ahmad Shah Durrani, who had just taken Kabul and Peshawar from the Mughal governor Nasir Khan. On the advice of Adina Beg, Shah Nawaz decided to ask Ahmad Shah for military assistance. Ahmad Shah agreed to his request on the condition that Shah Nawaz accept Afghan suzerainty, and began his invasion from Peshawar in December 1747.

== Battle ==
Adina Beg soon informed the Delhi government of Shah Nawaz's agreement with Durrani. Qamaruddin Khan was disappointed on hearing the news, and wrote a letter to Shah Nawaz in which he agreed to recognize his control over Lahore on the condition that he oppose Ahmad Shah's forces. Shah Nawaz agreed to the wazir's request and turned hostile against the Afghans. The Afghan Jahan Khan had crossed the Indus river with 8,000 of his men. Shah Nawaz fought them off, forcing Jahan Khan to retreat towards Peshawar, where Jahan Khan waited for Ahmad Shah's forces to arrive. Ahmad Shah entered the Punjab and occupied the fort of Rohtas. When he heard that Shah Nawaz had switched his allegiance back to the Mughals, he sent Sabir Shah and Muhammad Yar Khan to Lahore, where Shah Nawaz ordered Sabir Shah executed following what he perceived as insults against him. On hearing that Sabir Shah had been executed, Ahmad Shah began to march towards Lahore. During the journey, he gave Rawalpindi to Muqarrab Khan, a Gakkhar chief.

The Durrani army under Ahmad Shah had around 18,000 Afghan soldiers under his command, one third of which were from his own tribe. The Durrani army had no artillery, and was much smaller than that of the Mughals. The Mughal army under Shah Nawaz in contrast, had around 70,000 soldiers under his command in addition to artillery. On January 10, 1748, Durrani and his army camped near the Shalamar gardens. The Afghan and Mughal forces would fight one another on January 11, 1748.

Asmatullah Khan, one of the Mughal commanders, had around 10,000 cavalry and 5,000 musketeers, while Lachin Beg, another of their commanders had around 5,000 soldiers. According to Historian Sir Jadhunath Sarkar, Asmatullah and Lachin Beg had around 16,000 soldiers under their command. Shah Nawaz sent Jalhe Khan, a Pashtun commander from Kasur, to oppose Durrani's forces. However, Jalhe Khan defected to the Afghan side and joined Ahmad Shah Durrani. Ahmad Shah sent 1,000 of his musketeers to fire upon the Mughal forces and to retreat beyond the enemies' range. Shah Nawaz consulted an astrologer to predict the result of the battle. The astrologer told Shah Nawaz that there should not be any fighting that day, and instead to attack the Afghans the next day. Shah Nawaz accepted his advice and told his officers, Adina Beg and Diwan Kaura Mal, not to move out against the Afghan forces and to remain in their entrenchments.

Ahmad Shah was able to overpower the Qizilbash soldiers of the Mughal army and began pursuing them into their entrenchments. Asmatullah Khan began calling in for reinforcements, but Adina Beg did not provide them, soon fleeing towards Lahore. Seeing this, some of the Mughal soldiers retreated to their trenches in complete disorder. The Afghans launched a full-scale attack on the Mughal forces which forced Asmatullah Khan to retreat. The guns and artillery stored in the fort of Hazrat Ishan were captured by the Afghans. Adina Beg fired at the Afghans with cannons and rockets, but the Afghans were able to overpower the Mughals' resistance. Shah Nawaz escaped Lahore and fled towards Delhi. Asmatullah Khan was killed during the battle.

== Aftermath ==
Ahmad Shah Durrani and the Afghan forces entered Lahore on January 12, 1748, and released the members of the old Lahore government who had been imprisoned by Shah Nawaz. Mir Momin Khan, Lakhpath Rai and Surat Singh all pled with Durrani to spare the city from plunder, and paid him a ransom. Ahmad Shah accepted the ransom and ordered his officers to make sure that the Afghan soldiers would not plunder the city. Nonetheless, some parts of the city were looted by the Afghan forces anyway, and Afghan forces seized various guns, artillery pieces and treasures. New coins were minted in the name of Ahmad Shah Durrani. Thousands of women and children were enslaved, and thousands of Punjabis were conscripted into the Afghan army. Ahmad Shah appointed Jalhe Khan of Kasur as the new governor of Lahore, with Mir Momin Khan as his deputy and Lakhpath Rai as his Diwan. Ahmad Shah stayed in Lahore for five weeks before advancing on Delhi, but was defeated during the journey by a Mughal army at Manupur. Moin ul Mulk was then appointed as governor of Lahore, and both Jalhe Khan and Lakhpath Rai were arrested.

== See also ==
- Waris Shah

== Sources ==
- Gandhi, Rajmohan (2013). Punjab: A History from Aurangzeb to Mountbatten. Aleph Book company. ISBN 978-9382277583
- Gupta, Hari (1944). Studies in Later Mughal History of The Punjab 1707 To 1793. The Minerva Book company.
- Haig, Wolseley (1971) The Cambridge History of India Vol IV The Mughal Period. New Delhi: S. Chand & Co.
- Lee, Johnathan (2018). Afghanistan A History From 1260 To The Present. Reaktion Books. ISBN 978-178914-0101
- Mehta, J (2005). Advanced Study in the History of Modern India 1707-1813. New Dawn Press Inc. ISBN 1 932705 54 6
- Sarkar, Jadhunath (1964) Fall of the Mughal Empire Vol. 1 (3rd ed.). Orient longman Ltd. London.
- Singh, Ganda (1959). Ahmad Shah Durrani, Father of modern Afghanistan. Asia Publishing House.
- Singh, Ganda (1990). Sardar Jassa Singh Ahluwalia. Publication Bureau Punjabi University Patiala.
- Singh, Surinder (1985). The Mughal Subah Of Lahore 1581 To 1751 A Study In Administrative Structure And Practices. Panjabi University, Chandigarh
