= Nawab Zahid Khan =

Mughal Subahdar of Multan from 1747 to 1748

Zahid Khan
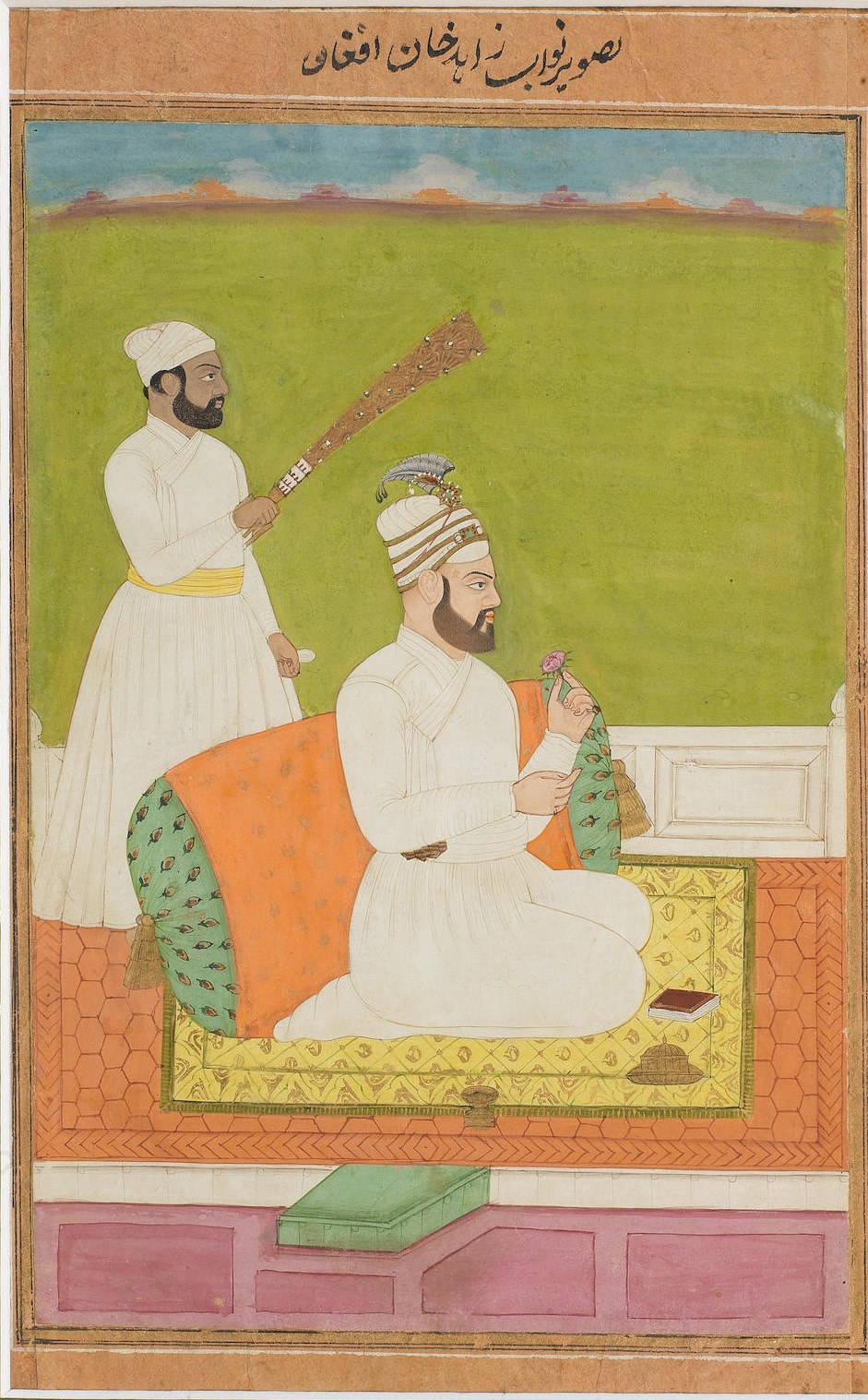

Mughal governor of Multan
- In office 1747–1748
- Monarch: Muhammad Shah
- Preceded by: Shāh Nawāz Khān
- Succeeded by: Kaura Mal

Personal details
- Born: Multan
- Died: 1749 Sitpur
- Children: Shuja Khan
- Parent: Abid Khan

Zahid Khan was the Mughal subedar of Multan province, for over a year from 1747 to 1748. He descended from an ethnic Saddozai Pashtun family long domiciled in Multan, and rose to the position of Nawab of Multan in the aftermath of the invasion of Nader Shah, owing to his personal relations with the Mughal courtier Qamar-ud-Din Khan.

Zahid Khan was confirmed on his position as the Nawab of Multan by Ahmad Shah Abdali during his invasion in 1748; this produced mistrust regarding his loyalty within the Mughal court and he was deposed and replaced with Shah Nawaz Khan who had earlier served as governor of Multan during 1745–1747. Zahid Khan refused to accept his appointment and fought against Shah Nawaz Khan who asked Mir Mannu, the subedar of Lahore, for aid. Mir Mannu due to his political rivalry with Shah Nawaz Khan appointed Kura Mal as the governor, and in the ensuing battle Shah Nawaz Khan was killed. Zahid Khan ultimately retired to Sitpur, where he died in 1749.

Zahid Khan was the father of Shuja Khan, and grandfather of Muzaffar Khan, the last Afghan governor of Multan.

== Sources ==
- Griffin, Lepel. H (1890). The Punjab Chiefs. Vol. I. Civil And Military Gazette Press Lahore. pp. 77–78.
