= Mughal Punjab =

Mughal Punjab may refer to:

- Subah of Lahore, subdivision of the Mughal Empire between 1580–1758
- Subah of Multan, subdivision of the Mughal Empire between 1580–1752
- Subah of Delhi, subdivision of the Mughal Empire between 1580–1857
