= Kaura Mal =

Subahdar of Multan from 1748 to 1751

Diwan Kaura Mal

Mughal governor of Multan
- In office 1748–1751
- Monarch: Ahmad Shah Bahadur
- Preceded by: Nawab Zahid Khan (as Mughal governor)
- Succeeded by: Ali Muhammad Khan Khakwani (as Durrani governor)

Personal details
- Born: Shorkot, Subah of Lahore
- Died: 1752 Lahore

Kaura Mal was an official of the Mughal Empire who served as Subahdar of Subah of Multan from 1748 to 1751. He served as Diwan of Lahore and Multan on various occasions as well. Kaura Mal is notable for being one of the few Sahajdhari Sikhs in the Mughal bureaucracy.

== Biography ==
Kaura Mal was the son of Vallu Ram, a Khatri or Arora of Chuggh clan, originally from Shorkot in the Subah of Lahore. His father and grandfather had been in the service of governors of Multan. He started his career in the service of the governor of Lahore Zakariya Khan, who appointed him as the Diwan of Multan after he helped in the capture and execution of Pannah Bhatti, a rebel chief, in 1738.

In 1746 Diwan Lakhpat Rai, in order to avenge the death of his brother Jaspat Rai, vowed to exterminate the Sikh sect and carried out the massacre of Sikhs, in an event known as Chhota Ghallughara, in spite of the pleads of Kaura Mal and the Hindu gentry of Lahore. Disgusted, Kaura Mal went to Multan and took service under Shah Nawaz Khan, Multan's governor and brother of Yahya Khan, the governor of Lahore. Soon a civil war broke out between the two brothers and Shah Nawaz Khan became governor of Lahore as well, and Kaura Mal was appointed the Diwan of Lahore in 1747.

In 1748, Punjab was invaded by Ahmad Shah Abdali and Shah Nawaz Khan was forced to flee. However, after the defeat of the Afghans in the Battle of Manupur Mughal control over Lahore was re-established. The newly appointed governor of Lahore Mir Mannu not only made Kaura Mal his Diwan but also appointed him as the deputy governor of Multan.

In 1748/1749, a quarrel broke out between Nawab Zahid Khan and Shah Nawaz Khan over the governorship of Multan. Mir Mannu sent Kaura Mal who defeated and killed Shah Nawaz Khan in a battle; Zahid Khan retired to Sitpur while Kaura Mal assumed the charge of Multan, Thatta and Derajat. Talwandi Rai Bhoe (now known as Nankana Sahib), where Guru Nanak spent his early-years, had been a deserted and abandoned habitation until Diwan Kaura Mal sponsored the construction of holy-tanks (sarovars) and memorial gurdwaras there in 1750, which had generous land holdings given to them by Kaura Mal, which formed the estate of Nankana Sahib until partition of Punjab in 1947.

Kaura Mal was again recalled by Mir Mannu in October 1751 during Ahmad Shah's second invasion. He was killed by Bazid Khan of Kasur in a battle near Lahore at the instance of Adina Beg, the faujdar of Jalandhar Doab.

== See also ==
- Kabuli Mal
- Sukh Jiwan Mal

== Sources ==
- Singh, Harbans, ed. (2011). "Kaura Mall, Diwan, Maharaja Bahadur (d. 1752)". The Encyclopedia Of Sikhism. Vol. II E–L (Third ed.). Punjabi University Patiala. pp. 461–463. ISBN 978-8-1-7380-349-9.
