= Shah Nawaz Khan (Mughal Empire) =

Mughal official (died 1749)

Shāh Nawāz Khān

Subahdar of Multan
- In office 1745–1747
- Monarch: Muhammad Shah
- Preceded by: Zakariya Khan Bahadur
- Succeeded by: Nawab Zahid Khan

Subahdar of Lahore
- In office 1747–1748
- Preceded by: Yahya Khan
- Succeeded by: Mir Mannu

Personal details
- Born: Subah of Lahore
- Died: September 1749 Multan
- Children: Mirza Jan

Shah Nawaz Khan (died 1749) was a son of Zakariya Khan Bahadur, the combined governor of Lahore and Multan subahs between 1726 and 1745. He succeeded Zakariya Khan as the governor of Multan after his death in 1745, while his brother Yahya Khan became governor of Lahore.

During 1746–1747, Shah Nawaz Khan was involved in a civil war with Yahya Khan. In March 1747, he entered Lahore and proclaimed himself to be the subedar, putting Yahya Khan in prison. However, after Yahya Khan escaped from his captivity, Shah Nawaz Khan turned to Ahmad Shah Abdali for help, who invaded Punjab in 1748. Upon Ahmed Shah's arrival, Shah Nawaz changed his allegiance back to the Mughals. He was defeated by Ahmad Shah at a battle near Lahore in 1748, and was forced to flee towards Delhi.

After Ahmed Shah's eventual defeat at Manupur in the same year at the hands of Mir Mannu, Shah Nawaz Khan was again appointed governor of Multan to replace Nawab Zahid Khan, a relative of Ahmad Shah, by the Mughal court. However, Zahid Khan refused to accept his appointment and fought against Shah Nawaz Khan who asked Mir Mannu for aid. Mir Mannu due to his political rivalry with Shah Nawaz Khan appointed Kaura Mal as the governor instead, and in the ensuing battle Shah Nawaz Khan was killed in 1749. Shah Nawaz's son, Mirza Jan, fled to Farrukhabad, where he lived till his death.
