= Battle of Multan (1749) =

Part of Mughal-Sikh Wars

- Part of Mughal-Sikh Wars
Date	September 1749
Location	Outskirts of Multan
Result	Kaura Mal victory

Belligerents
Kaura Mal's forces Supported by Dal Khalsa	Shah Nawaz Khan's forces

Commanders and leaders
Diwan Kaura Mal; Asmat Khan †; Abdul Aziz Khan †; Jassa Singh Ahluwalia; Sukha Singh	Shah Nawaz Khan †; Khawajah Shah †; Zahad Khan †; Sujah Khan

Strength
Unknown number under Kaura Mal; 10,000 Sikhs	15,000

The Battle of Multan, also known as the Battle of Daurana Langana, was fought in September 1749 by Kaura Mal's Mughal forces assisted by Jassa Singh Ahluwalia's Sikhs and the Mughal forces under Shah Nawaz Khan.

== Background ==
Shah Nawaz Khan, the governor of Punjab had occupied Multan was revolting against Mir Mannu when he was having hard times. He was hated by everyone after how many people he had slaughtered when he was the custodian of Lahore. Therefore, Mir Mannu decided to send Kaura Mal and Asmat Khan to Multan with a large force with a mission to stop the revolt. Since Kaura Mal didn't have many men and materials, he sought for help from the Sikhs and promised them all payment. Their leader Jassa Singh Ahluwalia marched alongside Kaura Mal with 10,000 Sikhs. Kaura Mal won the hearts of the Sikhs by offering them sweet cold drinks which gave him the nickname of Mitha Mal, which means Mr.Sweet.

== Battle ==
The two parties clashed in the outskirts of Multan. The battalion under Khawajah Shah had killed a large amount of Kaura Mal's army which made Shah Nawaz Khan's victory certain. However, some Sikhs fired at him and killed him. This caused a lot of confusion around in the enemy in which Shah Nawaz's horse was shot down and his head was chopped off by a Sikh named Bhim Singh. The Multan Mughals were defeated not too long after this.

== Aftermath ==
Mir Mannu was proud of Kaura Mal and was given the title of Maharaja Bahadur and was also appointed the governor of Multan.

== See also ==
- Nihang
- Martyrdom and Sikhism
