= Battle of Manupur =

Durrani–Mughal battle in 1748

- Part of Indian campaign of Ahmad Shah Durrani
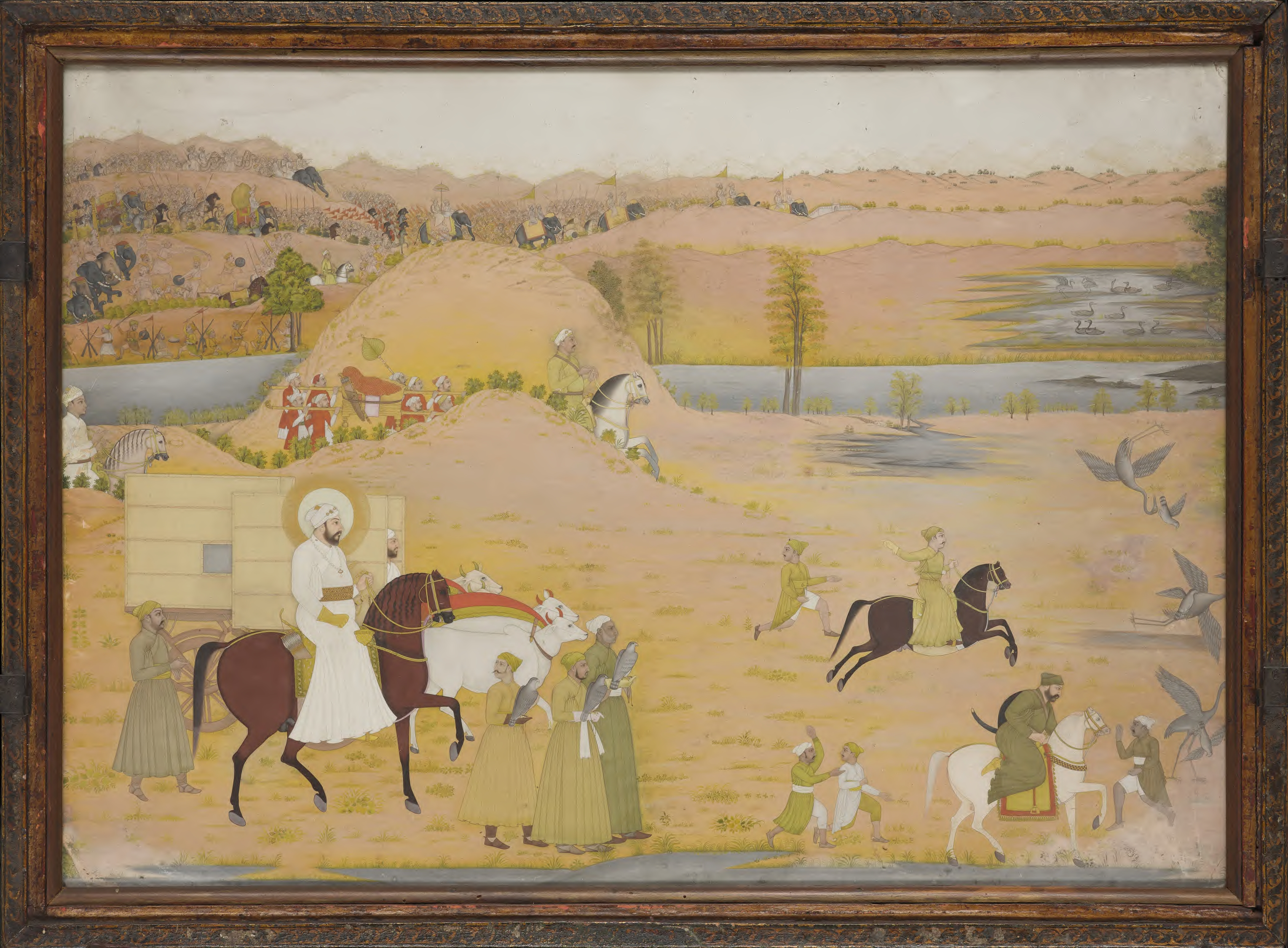
- Muhammad Shah and the Mughal army at Sirhind c. 1748
Date	11 March 1748
Location	Manupur, Mughal Empire 30°38′6″N 76°26′6″E
Result	Mughal victory

Belligerents
Durrani Empire	Mughal Empire; Kingdom of Jaipur; Malerkotla State

Commanders and leaders
Ahmad Shah Durrani; Jahan Khan; Taqi Khan Shirazi; Shah Pasand Khan	Qamar ud-Din †; Moin ul-Mulk (WIA); Safdar Jang; Adina Beg (WIA); Bahadur Shah; Nasir Khan; Ishwari Singh (AWOL); Ala Singh; Jamal Khan

Units involved
12,000 (highest estimate)	60,000–70,000 combatants 200,000 including camp followers (non-combatants); Immeasurable artillery

Casualties and losses
Heavy	Heavy

The Battle of Manupur took place on 11 March 1748 between the forces of the rising Durrani Empire led by Afghan Emperor Ahmad Shah Durrani and the armies of the Mughal Empire led by Mughal Vizier Qamar ud-Din. It was part of Ahmad Shah's first invasion of India. The Afghans had successfully stormed through Mughal territories in Afghanistan and Punjab, defeating the Mughals at Lahore. The Mughals immediately began raising a stronger force, led by Qamar ud-Din and Mughal prince Bahadur Shah, to oppose the Afghan invasion. The Afghans continued their offensive, seizing Sirhind before the two armies met at Manupur.

The Afghans were overwhelmingly outnumbered 5:1 as the battle began. Early on, Qamar ud-Din was killed, resulting in his son, Moin ul-Mulk, taking the lead of the Mughal army. The battle began with Afghan charges to the Mughal center, inflicting heavy casualties on them while the Mughals held. The Mughal left flank was entirely dismantled by Afghan Zamburak swivel guns, with the Rajputs stationed there under Ishwari Singh completely fleeing. The Afghans enveloped Moin ul-Mulk, who led a counter charge that led to many Mughal officers being killed, and their own defeat seeming near. A critical counter-attack by Safdar Jang, alongside a rocket disaster in the Afghan ranks, and the superiority of Mughal numbers eventually forced the Afghans to retreat.

Despite the defeat, Ahmad Shah saved his army from massacre, and returned the following year in his second invasion of India, intending to avenge his defeat.

== Background ==
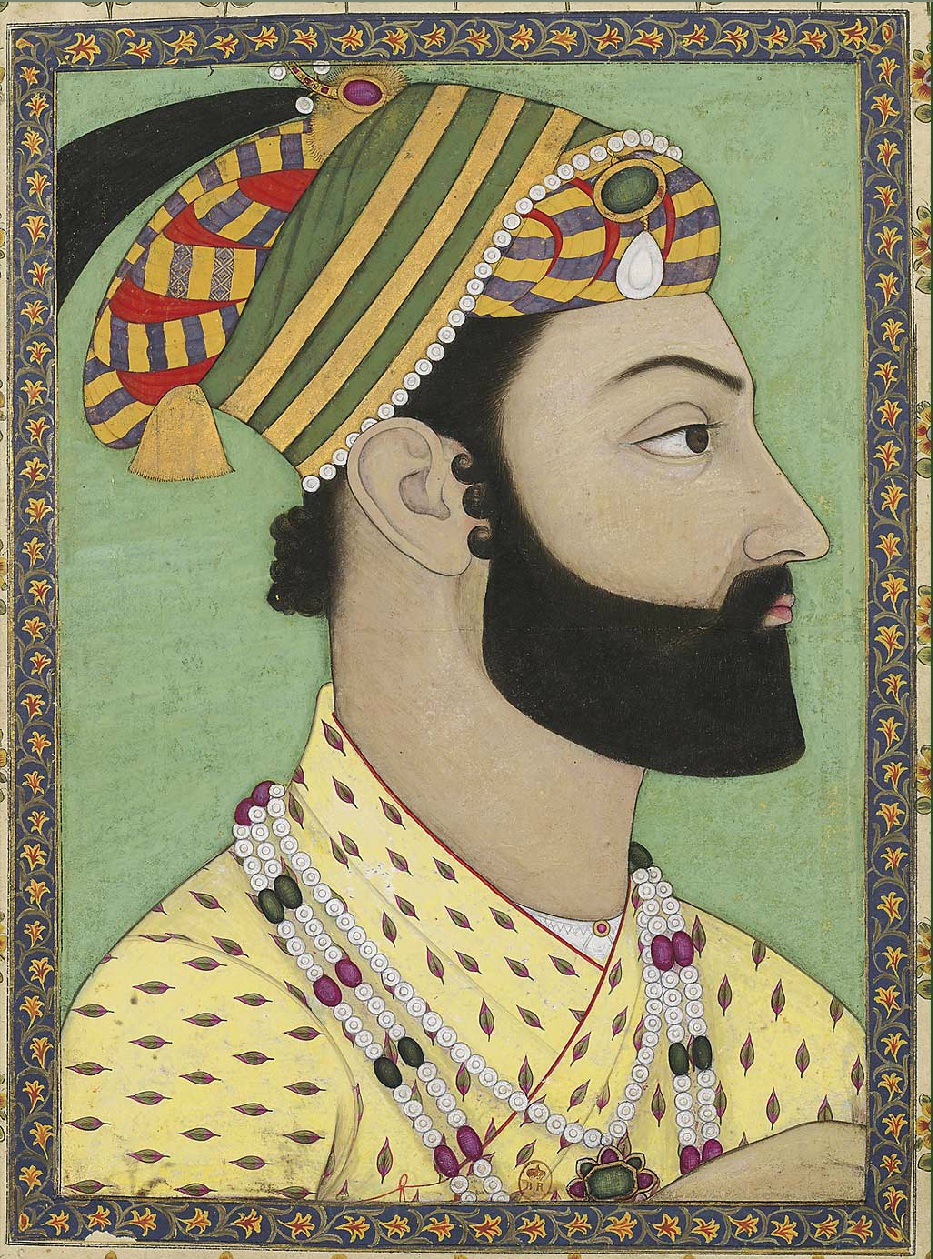
Contemporary portrait of Ahmad Shah Durrani

In 1747, Ahmad Shah Durrani, considered by modern scholars to be the founder of modern Afghanistan, established the Durrani Empire and led his first invasion of India. He began his invasion from Kabul, dispatching his commander-in-chief, Jahan Khan, toward Peshawar with the intention of advancing as far as Attock. Jahan Khan quickly overran Jalalabad, and Nasir Khan, the Mughal governor, was unable mount a defense at the Khyber Pass, fleeing instead. The Afghan armies approached Peshawar, prompting many Pashtun tribes to declare for them, such as the Yusufzai, Afridi, and Khattak. With Nasir Khan overwhelmed, he completely withdrew from Peshawar and fled to Delhi.

Shāh Nawāz Khān, the Mughal governor of the Punjab, entered into correspondence with the Afghans after they had seized Peshawar. Shah Nawaz, having toppled his brother from power to assume control over the Punjab, was opposed by the Mughal emperor Muhammad Shah, who refused to recognize him as governor. As a result, the Afghans promised to recognize Shah Nawaz as governor of the Punjab if he accepted Durrani suzerainty. Shah Nawaz accepted this before the Mughal vizier promised to confirm him as governor if he opposed the Afghan invasion instead, which Shah Nawaz accepted.

The betrayal saw Ahmad Shah dispatch Sabir Shah to try and convince Shah Nawaz once again. However, after insulting Shah Nawaz, Sabir was imprisoned and executed, and Shah Nawaz began marching against the Afghan army. Ahmad Shah forded the Indus with over 30,000 men, reaching and crossing the Ravi River on 10 January, establishing himself at the Shalimar Gardens, outside of Lahore. The armies of Shah Nawaz and Ahmad Shah began battle on 11 January, and as the battle began, the Afghan regiments of Shah Nawaz's army defected. Despite commanding a much larger army then the Afghans, the Mughals were defeated, and Shah Nawaz fled to Delhi.

With their victory, the Afghans entered Lahore, plundering the city and massacring its inhabitants. Thousands were also conscripted, while the Mughals began mobilizing new army of over 200,000 including camp followers. Ahmad Shah left Lahore on 19 February, intending to march on Delhi. He captured Sirhind and continued advancing, a result that brought much of the Mughal army to near desertion. The Afghan army outmaneuvered the Mughal host they met at Manupur.

== Battle ==
=== Death of Mughal Vizier Qamar ud-Din ===
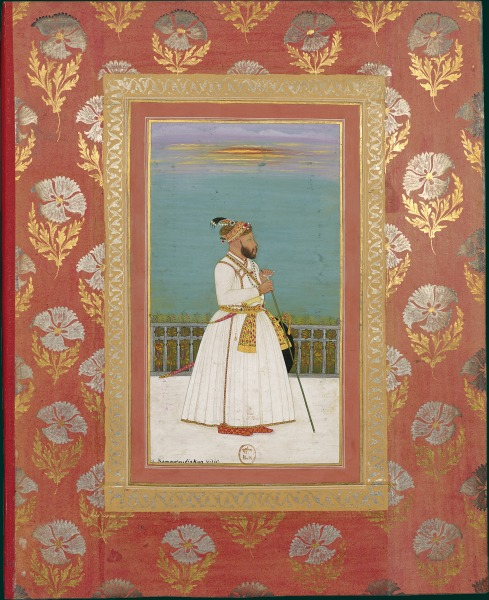
Depiction of Mughal Vizier Qamar ud-Din

Between 4 and 11 March, the Mughal forces under Qamar ud-Din focused on trying to starve out Ahmad Shah's force rather than engage in a pitched battle. Local chiefs were employed such as Ala Singh, the Maharaja of Patiala, and Jamal Khan of Malerkotla. However, success remained minimal, as the city of Sirhind behind Afghan lines was well supplied with food and water. Skirmishing parties dispatched by Ahmad Shah proved much more successful, effectively surrounding the Mughal camp. Ahmad Shah continued to press his advantages, bringing in an artillery piece from Lahore and placing it on top of a hill overlooking the Mughal camp on 9 March. The cannon began to tear apart the Mughal army and its pack animals, forcing Qamar ud-Din to resort to pitched battle.

On the morning of 11 March, the Mughal army readied to advance, with Qamar ud-Din intending to lead the charge. However, while Qamar ud-Din was in prayer, a cannonball struck him in the waist. Having possibly been accomplished through infiltration by spies and the measuring of the distance for a cannon to strike the vizier's tent. Qamar ud-Din died of his wounds. His son, Moin ul-Mulk, concealed the death and only informed his captains, intending to lead the battle himself.

=== Formations and number of troops ===
The Mughal host boasted over 200,000 including its camp followers, while it had around 60,000 to 70,000 combatants. The advance guard of the Mughal formation was led by Moin ul-Mulk with a contingent of Turks. Safdar Jang led the right contingent of the Mughal army, while the center was led by Bahadur Shah, (Note: The center refers to the middle of the Mughal army in tactical formation.) also accompanied by Sayyid Salabt Khan and Dilawar Khan. The center had overwhelming numbers of artillery. Ishwari Singh led the left flank of the army with many other Indian Rajas, comprising mainly Rajput cavalry, while the rearguard was commanded by Nasir Khan.

In comparison, the Afghan army only had at its best estimate, 12,000 men, (Note: The Afghan army is best estimated as being around 12,000 men. The Siyar-ul-Mutakherin underestimates the army to not be more than 6,000 or 7,000 men, while Anandram exaggerates the Afghan army to be 30,000 strong.) being overwhelmingly outnumbered by the Mughals 5:1. The Mughal flanks were extremely drawn out, and heavy artillery protected their center. Recognizing he was inferior in number, Ahmad Shah concluded the best course of option was to press the Mughal vanguard and to shatter the flanks to threaten their camp in the rear, intending to utilize superior mobility. A contingent of troops were split off and were directed to attack the baggage train of the Mughals when the battle began. The right flank of the Afghan army was commanded by Jahan Khan, with the center led by Ahmad Shah himself. Lastly, the left flank was commanded by Shah Pasand Khan.

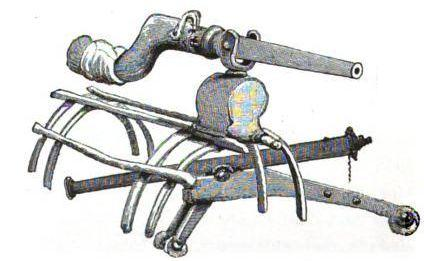
Depiction of a Zamburak swivel gun, typically mounted on camels

=== Afghan assault and flight of the Rajputs ===
Possibly learning of the Vizier's death, Taqi Khan, a chief commander of the Durrani army, attacked the Mughal vanguard with over 3,000 men. Taqi Khan led his men toward the Mughal lines to quickly deliver a volley fire before withdrawing as the Mughals attempted to respond, subsequently repeating the tactic. The Mughals, defensively entrenched, used their overwhelming numbers and heavy artillery to check the Afghan advance. Ahmad Shah reinforced Taqi Khan, however, Moin ul-Mulk held his line with heavy losses. The Mughal cannon fire caused heavy casualties to the Afghan cavalry.

On the Mughal right flank where the Rajputs were stationed, the Afghans made significant gains. As the Rajputs prepared for close quarters combat, the Afghans led over 200 Zamburak swivel guns and 3,000 cavalrymen, divided into two divisions. One division would charge toward the Rajput lines and deliver barrages on them before withdrawing, after which the second division advanced and repeated the tactic. Excellent in close quarters combat, but helpless to the Afghan artillery, the Rajput forces were overwhelmed and unable to respond to the Afghan assault. The Afghan attacks continued, killing thousands. Ishwari Singh, learning of the Vizier's death, and seeing his army pulverized, fled from the battlefield.

Unopposed, an Afghan force split off and plundered the Mughal baggage train, while also flanking Moin ul-Mulk's entrenched position, and the center. With panic gripping the Mughal army, Moin ul-Mulk led a counterattack toward the Afghan center, engaging in close quarters combat. Heavy casualties mounted on both sides, with Moin ul-Mulk being grazed by a bullet, Adina Beg being wounded twice, and the death of numerous Mughal officers. Widespread desertion plagued the Mughal ranks, and defeat appeared inevitable.

=== Safdar Jang's counterattack and Afghan rocket disaster ===
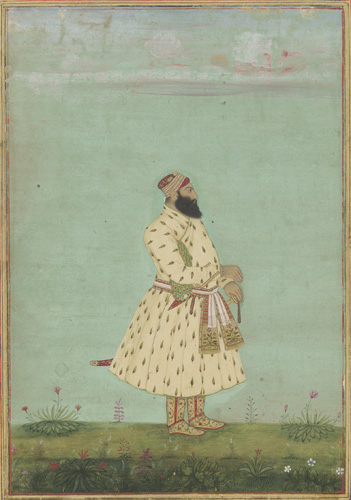
Depiction of Safdar Jang, who led a critical counterattack for the Mughals at the height of the battle

On the Mughal right flank, Safdar Jang faced a Zamburak attack ordered by Ahmad Shah, who sent over 700 camel-mounted swivel guns to a hill above Safdar Jang's position. Threatened with annihilation, Safdar Jang dispatched 1,700 musketeers, who charged uphill. A concentrated volley of fire from the Mughals killed many of the Afghan gunners, allowing the Mughals to seize the position and the Afghan swivel guns. An attempted counterattack by the Afghans failed, and the Mughals remained victorious on the right flank.

With his success, Safdar Jang reinforced Moin ul-Mulk's position, and led all his men in an advance to draw attention away from the pressed Mughal center. His reinforcements saw over 700 swivel and heavy guns delivered to relieve the center, while the men of Bahadur Shah and Nasir Khan fought alongside them. The overwhelming number of Mughals made resistance seem impossible.

Amidst the battle, rockets captured by the Afghans during their plunder of Lahore ignited, possibly due to recklessness. Thousands of rockets flew into the air, which also ignited the gunpowder of the Afghan artillery. A thousand Afghan and Persian men were burned to death, with complete disorder overrunning the Afghan ranks.

=== Afghan withdrawal ===
With the disaster for the Afghans, alongside the overwhelming advance by Safdar Jang and Moin ul-Mulk, Ahmad Shah ordered a retreat. Although defeated, Ahmad Shah saved his army from a rout and annihilation. Realizing he could not lead a counter-attack, Ahmad Shah withdrew in calm order, arraying his men for battle and exchanging volley musket fire with the Mughals before retreating and continuing the same tactic. He occupied a position at a mud fortress between Manupur and Sirhind, firing on the Mughals from it, halting their advances. As the Mughal cannons arrived, night fell, and they instead returned to camp, while Ahmad Shah left in the cover of night.

Unaware of the state of the Afghan army, nor their positions, the Mughals chose not to pursue. Scouts sent from the Mughal camp only found rumors that Ahmad Shah had possibly been killed or at the least, grievously wounded. Ahmad Shah sent Taqi Khan in deception to stall for time, asking for peace by demanding all that Nader Shah had taken in his invasion to be ceded to him. He utilized the time to garner his army's strength, and sent away his baggage train to Lahore, which he began withdrawing to.

During this time, Mughal Emperor Muhammad Shah fell ill and died, forcing the Mughals to halt their pursuit. Safdar Jung also fell ill, with all operations by the Mughals concluding on 9 April, while Ahmad Shah conducted a successful retreat.

=== Reasons for outcome ===
Despite initial Afghan victory against the Mughal left flank, and Mughal defeat seeming apparent, firepower proved exceptionally significant in the battle, with Mughal artillery causing heavy losses to the initial Afghan cavalry attack. Combined with a rocket disaster that burned a thousand Afghan men and disorganization in the army as a result, as well as Safdar Jang's counterattack which saw the Mughals swarm the Afghans on all sides with superior numbers, the Afghan army was eventually forced to retreat from the battlefield.

== Aftermath ==
Withdrawing to Lahore, Ahmad Shah became aware that his nephew, Luqman Khan, who had been left as regent in Kandahar, had revolted. Ahmad Shah returned to Afghanistan, although not without opposition, with the Sikhs attacking the Afghan rearguard until they reached the Chenab. Ahmad Shah marched on Kandahar, quickly quelling the revolt. He spent the summer of 1748 preparing for his second invasion of India.

The timing was significant for Ahmad Shah, with the death of Mughal Vizier Qamar-ud-Din at Manupur, and the death of the Mughal emperor Muhammad Shah, which saw him succeeded by Bahadur Shah, who largely focused on personal pleasures. The Mughal victory did not discourage Ahmad Shah, who wished to avenge his defeat.

Throughout Ahmad Shah's reign, he'd lead a total of nine invasions of India, and in November 1748, he launched his second invasion, quickly forcing Moin-ul-Mulk to cede him control of all territories north of the Indus, as well as the revenues for the cities of Sialkot, Pasrur, Aurangabad, and Gukraj, which amounted to nearly one and a half million rupees yearly. A third invasion saw Ahmad Shah conquer Lahore, annexing the Mughal province as well as Multan and Kashmir, with Moin ul-Mulk serving as his governor.

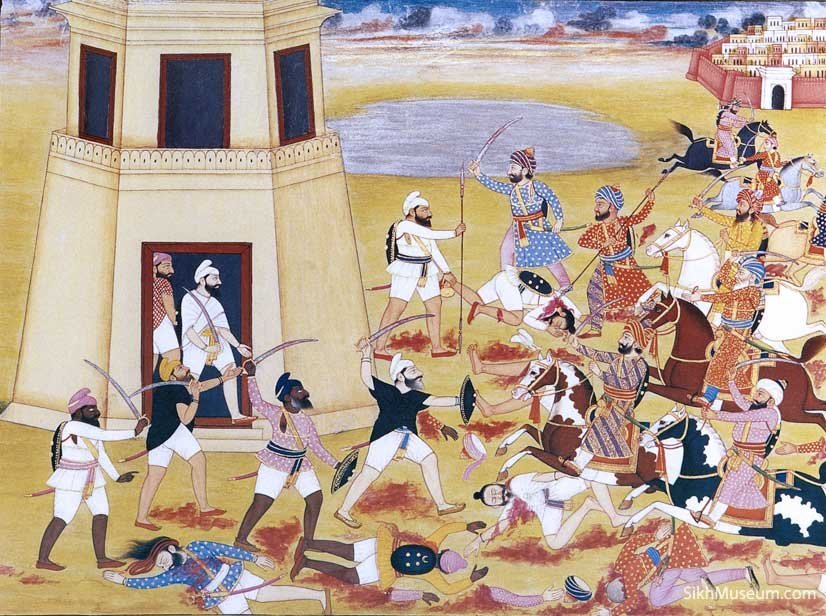
Depiction of a battle between Afghans and Sikhs

Shortly after the battle of Manupur, the Sikhs established the Dal Khalsa after Ahmad Shah withdrew from the region, placing Jassa Singh as its chief commander. During Ahmad Shah Durrani's second invasion of India, the Sikhs had plundered the city of Lahore, evoking the wrath of Moin ul-Mulk, who executed thousands of Sikhs.

Moin ul-Mulk would continue his campaigns against the Sikhs until his death in 1753, while the Sikhs would in turn, hamper government control in the countryside. By 1756, the Sikhs rapidly accumulated in strength. During this period, Ahmad Shah Durrani led yet another invasion of India, sacking Delhi in 1757, and erasing Mughal authority. Ahmad Shah also brought himself to blows against the Sikhs. While on the march to Delhi, the stragglers of Ahmad Shah's army were attacked by the Sikhs, and the baggage train robbed, even seizing treasures as Ahmad Shah returned to Afghanistan from his campaign.

The new emerging conflict between the Afghans and Sikhs would erase Sikh progress for over a decade, and Sikh holy sites such as Amritsar would be destroyed, with the Sikhs persecuted. Between his sixth and ninth invasions of India, Ahmad Shah would see regular conflict with the Sikhs, but by the end of it, the Sikhs would establish themselves firmly in much of the Punjab.
