= Battle of Lahore (1752) =

1752 battle

- Part of the Indian Campaign of Ahmad Shah Durrani
Date	6 March – 3 April 1752
Location	Lahore, Mughal Empire (present day Punjab, Pakistan)
Result	Afghan victory

Belligerents
Durrani Empire	Mughal Empire

Commanders and leaders
Ahmad Shah Durrani	Ahmad Shah Bahadur; Moin-ul-Mulk; Kaura Mal †

Strength
Unknown	50,000

The Battle of Lahore was battle which took place between the invading Ahmed Shah Abdali and Mir Mannu, the Mughal governor of Punjab in 1752. It took place at Lahore in current day Punjab province of Pakistan. After the Mughals were defeated, Abdali decided to retain Mannu as the city's governor on his own behalf.

== Conflict ==
Ahmed Shah Abdali invaded India seven times from 1748 to 1767. The frequency of his repeated invasions reflected his "tireless energy, ambition" and purpose. Being poor as well as a "backward country", Afghanistan could not provide subsistence to its population or provide a financial support for running the government. So it was "necessary" for Abdali to invade a "rich but poorly defended neighbouring country" India to plunder and exploit her resources. He also wanted to establish "political hegemony" in India. During his time, the Mughal empire was disintegrating and he was "eager to step into the shoes of the decadent Mughal authority" to fill up the "political vacuum without any loss of time".

In the winter of 1751, he invaded India for the third time on the pretext that Mir Mannu, the Mughal governor of the province of Punjab, had refused to pay him tax which he had promised to give on a monthly basis. Abdali started the battle by successfully besieging Mannu in the Lahore Fort. Though Mannu wrote to the Mughal emperor Ahmad Shah Bahadur for help, he received no reinforcements from Delhi. Failing to put up a fight, he surrendered to Abdali on 6 March 1752. After signing the instrument of surrender, Abdali's forces looted and plundered the city. On his orders, nine hundred Sikhs who were trapped in the fort of Ram Rauni were killed. But Abdali was impressed by the "heroic fight" put up by the Mughal governor; so he appointed him as the province's governor on his own behalf. Abdali also conferred him the title "Farzand Khan Bahadur Rustam-e-Hind".

Consequently, Mannu held a reception at Lahore in honour of Abdali. He also signed a peace treaty under which the two territories of Punjab – Multan and Lahore - were to be ceded to Abdali's Afghan empire. Once the treaty was signed, Abdali sent his troops to Multan to take possession of the city and some of his men to Delhi to confirm the treaty with the Mughal emperor Ahmad Shah Bahadur. Bahadur, with advice from the royal advisor Javed Khan, put his seal on the treaty on 3 April, which cut Punjab from the Mughal empire. At that time, the wazir of Delhi, Safdar Jang, was in Awadh to suppress a rebellion. He returned at the end of the month with fresh recruits to confront Abdali, but learned of the treaty and retreated.

== Bibliography ==
- Mehta, Jaswant Lal (January 2005). Advanced Study in the History of Modern India 1707–1813. Sterling Publishers. ISBN 9781932705546.
- Kohli, Surinder Singh (1990). The Sikh and Sikhism. Atlantic Publishers and Distributors. ISBN 9788171160938.
- Gupta, Hari Ram (1978). History of the Sikhs: Evolution of Sikh confederacies, 1708–1769. Munshiram Manoharlal.
