= Subah of Lahore =

Subdivision of the Mughal Empire between 1580–1758

Lahore Subah
- 1580–1758
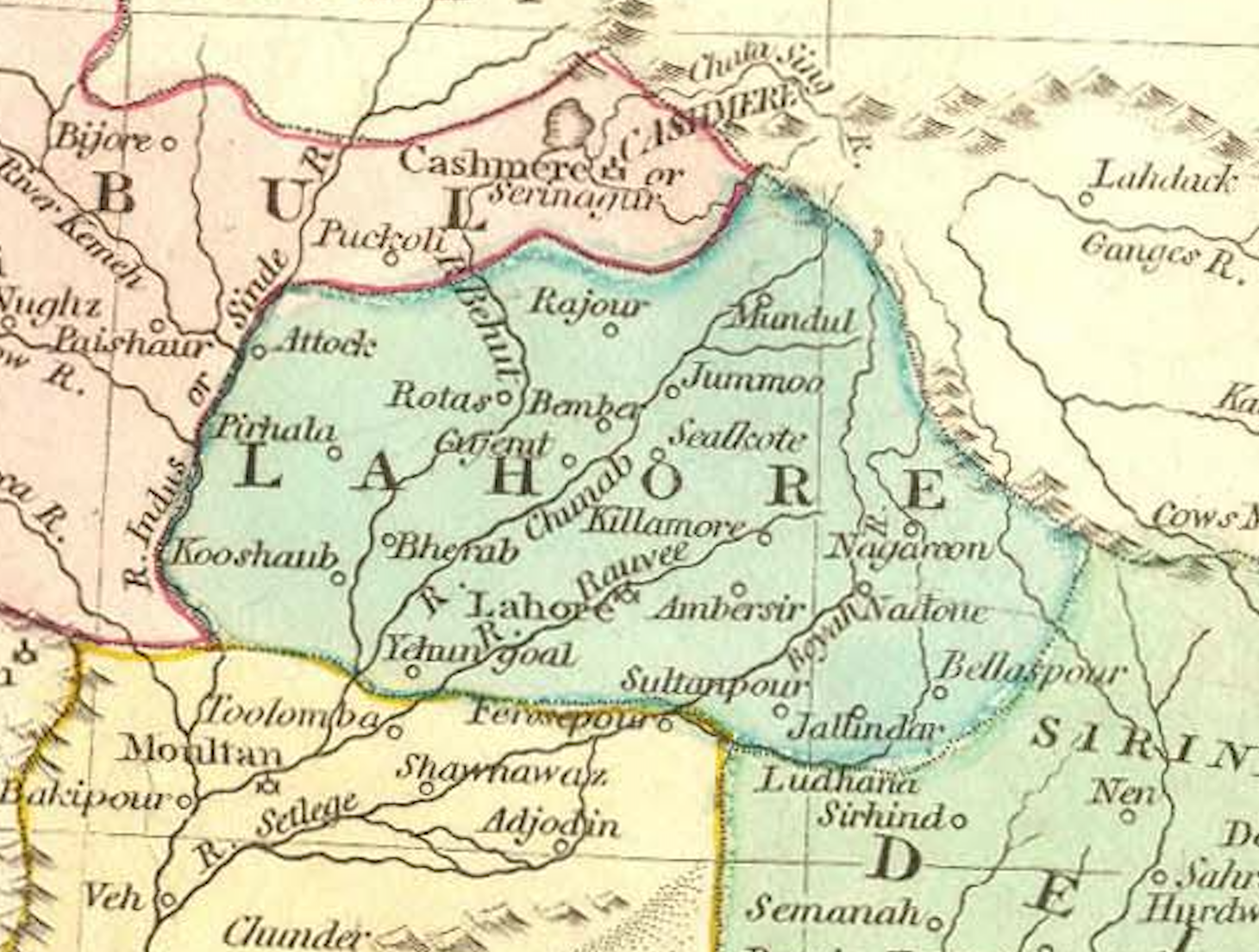
- Lahore Subah depicted in map of Mughal India by Robert Wilkinson (1805)
- Capital: Lahore
- Government: Subdivision
- Historical era: Early modern period
  - Established: 1580
  - Disestablished: 15 September 1758

Area
  - 1601: 140,970 km^{2} (54,430 sq mi)
Preceded by
Mughal Empire
Succeeded by
Durrani Empire
Sikh Confederacy
Sial dynasty
- Today part of: India; Pakistan

The Subah of Lahore (Persian: صوبه لاهور, romanized: Sūbah-yi-Lāhor) was a subah (province) of the Mughal Empire in the Punjab region, encompassing the northern, central and eastern Punjab. It was established as one of the twelve original Mughal subahs under the administrative reforms carried out by Akbar in 1580. In 1752, the subahdar Muin ul-Mulk transferred his allegiance to Ahmad Shah Durrani. The province ceased to exist as a political unit after the death of Adina Beg in 1758, with large parts being incorporated into Durrani Empire.

One of the three subahs in Punjab alongside Multan and Delhi, collectively, Lahore, Multan, and parts of Delhi subah comprised "Mughal Punjab".

== Geography ==
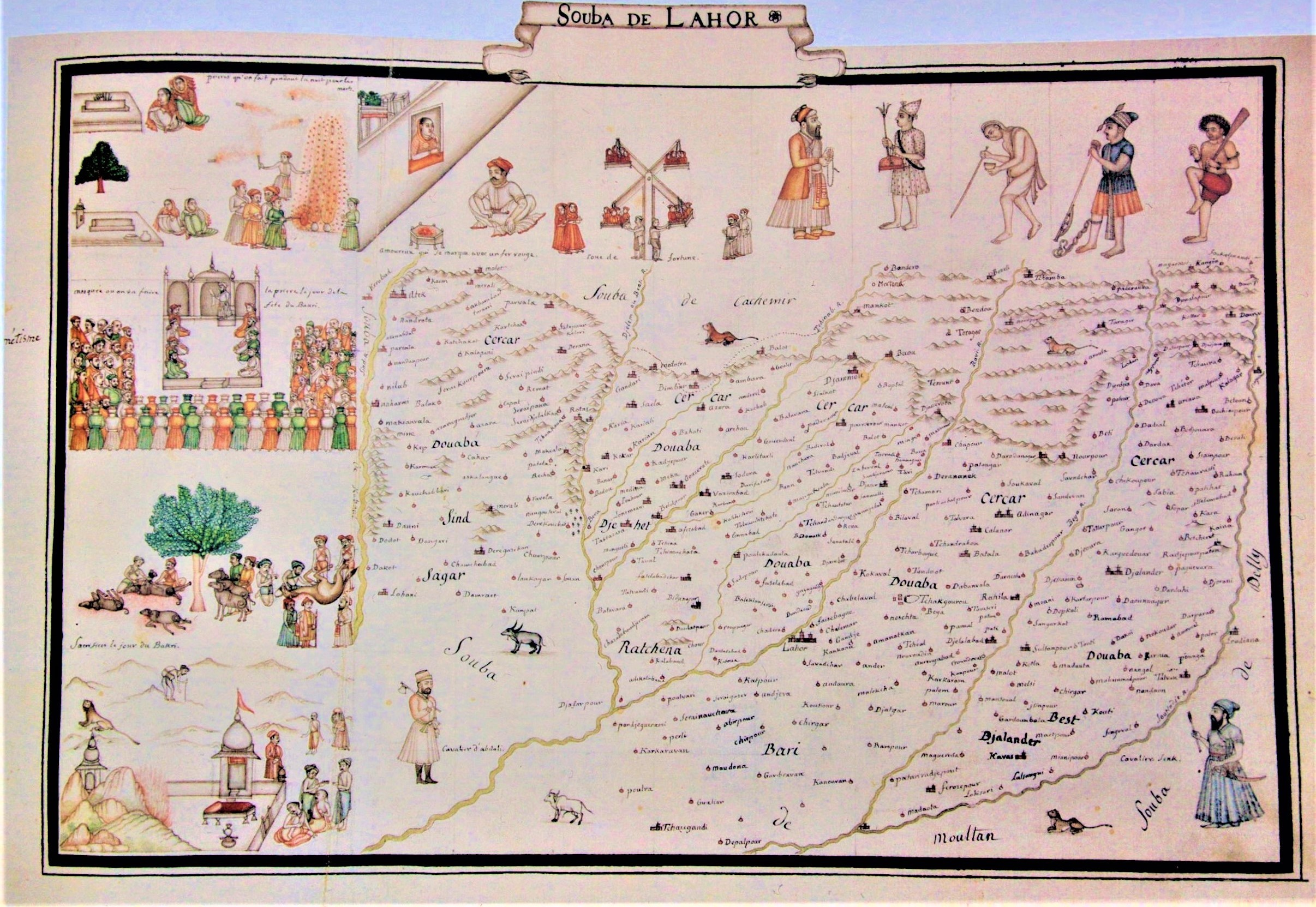
Elaborately illustrated map of the Lahore Subah of the Mughal Empire commissioned by Jean Baptiste Joseph Gentil, ca.1770

The subah of Lahore was bordered on the south by the Multan Subah and Delhi Subah, to the north by Kashmir Subah, to the west by the Kabul Subah, and to the north east by the semi-autonomous hill states.

== History ==
=== Establishing Mughal control ===
In 1519, Babur first crossed the Indus River and took control of the entire Sind Sagar Doab up to Bhera and Khushab, and by 1524 he had sacked Lahore. He then appointed representatives to key positions in his newly occupied territories, including Mir Abdul Aziz at Lahore. He went on to take several key hill forts such as Kutila, Harur and Kahlur. By 1526 the whole region from the Indus to the Sutlej was under his control.

After Babur's death, his son Kamran annexed the region up to the Sutlej, an act acquiesced by Humayun based in Delhi. Now lacking resources from the strategically important region, Humayun struggled in his conflict against Sher Shah Suri and fled to Kabul. The region became part of the Sur Empire.

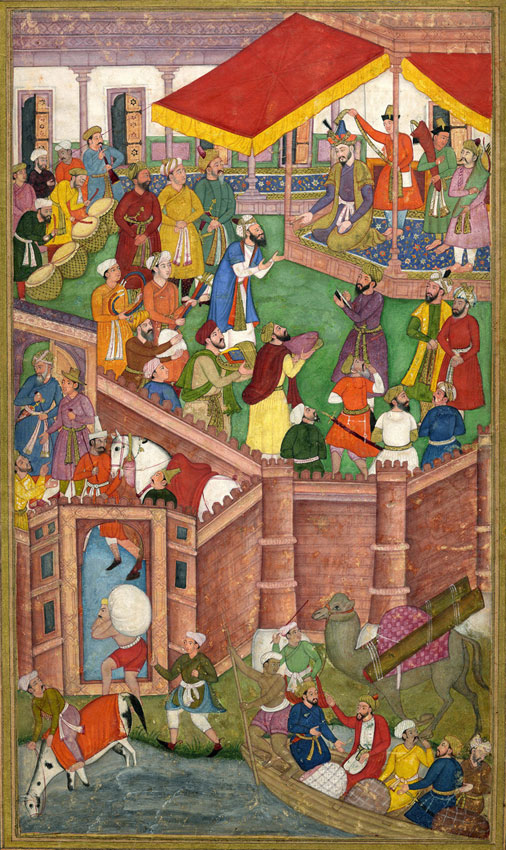
'Arrival of Humayun in the City of Lahore', illustrated folio from the "third" Akbarnama manuscript, ca.1595–1600

Sher Shah instituted a policy of populating the region from Nilab to Lahore with Pashtuns from Roh. Next he launched campaigns against the Gakhars, about whom he suspected of being friendly with the Mughals. During this period, Sher Shah constructed the Rohtas Fort near Jhelum. Following the death of Sher Shah's successor Islam Shah in 1555, the Sur Empire fragmented into four separate and hostile divisions. Punjab came under the control of Sikandar Shah and later Adil Shah who also controlled Delhi and Agra. However Mughal forces under Humayun defeated Adil at the battle of Sirhind in 1555 and re-established the Mughal Empire across the Punjab and northern India.

Over the next twenty-four year, the Mughals gradually consolidated power in the Punjab. Campaigns followed to subdue local zamindars, the hill forts, and remnants of the Afghan establishment. The Gakhars were co-opted and assimilated into the Mughal polity under Kamal Khan, the son of Rai Sarang. In 1566 and 1581 Mirza Hakim, half-brother of Akbar launched unsuccessful campaigns to occupy Lahore.

In 1580, Akbar re-organised his territories into twelve subahs, one of which was the Lahore Subah.

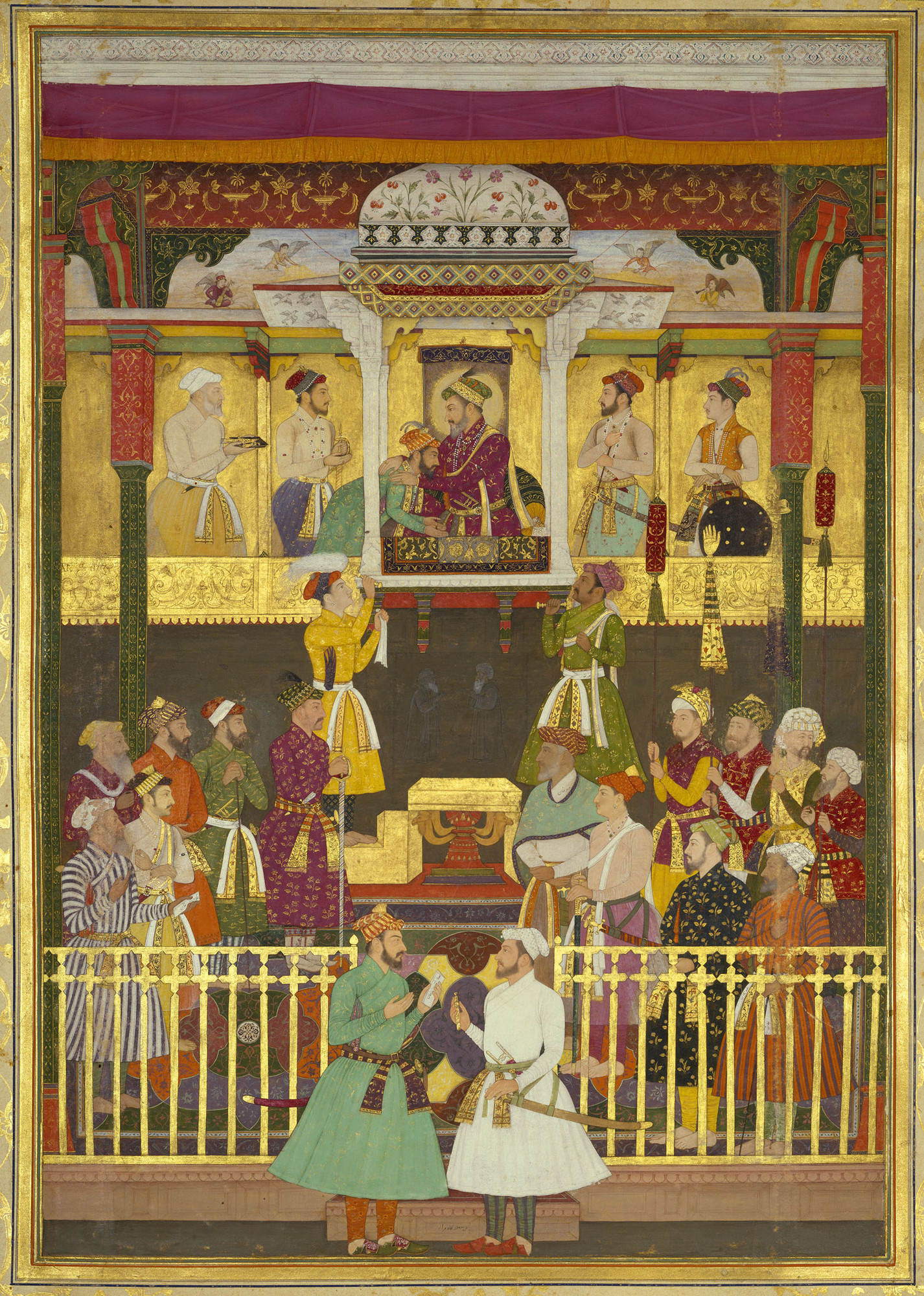
Painting depicting the arrival of Prince Aurangzeb at the court of Lahore (9 January 1640) and him being greeted by Shah Jahan, by Murar

Between August 1638 and 1642, Shah Jahan shifted the Mughal court to Lahore owing to his armies then battling the Safavid Empire over control of Kandahar. Aurangzeb (then a prince) made a brief visit to Lahore on 9 January 1640.

=== Decline ===
Following the death of Bahadur Shah in 1712, a succession of rulers sat on the Mughal throne influenced by powerful and competing nobles. The erosion of imperial authority soon impacted the provinces where local governors began to declare independence. The loss of territory, and failure to exert to military influence over the provinces, led to a loss of revenue and financial crisis across the empire. In the Lahore Subah, the tenure of governors increased and began to be seen as a hereditary post. Between 1713 and 1745, the role of governor was held by just two people, a father and son duo, Abd al-Samad Khan and Zakariya Khan.

The death of Zakariyah Khan further hastened the end of Mughal rule in the subah. A conflict between the emperor Muhammad Shah and his wazir, Qamruddin, led to a delay in appointing a replacement governor. Eventually, Qamruddin was made governor of both the Lahore and Multan subahs, and he nominated first Mir Momin Khan and later Yahya Khan, the son of late Zakariya Khan and his son-in-law, to deputise for him as governor in the two subahs.

The absence of a strong administration since Zakariyah Khan's death hindered Yahya Khan. He was forced to deal with increased raiding by Sikhs and a rebellion by Hayatullah Khan, his brother and governor of Multan. On 21 March 1747 Hayatullah Khan successfully defeated Yayha Khan in battle. The ousting of Yahya Khan was the first instance of a legitimate appointed governor being displaced in the subah. When his attempts to legitimise his position with the Mughal central government failed, Hayatullah Khan allied himself with Ahmad Shah Durrani, the shah of the Durrani Empire. In response, the Mughal government offered to legitimise him and grant him the subahs of Kabul, Kashmir, Thatta, Lahore and Multan if he defeated Ahmad Shah, an offer he accepted. In January 1748, Hayatullah Khan was defeated by the Afghans and fled to Delhi.

Having occupied Lahore, the Afghans proceeded to Delhi however were defeated at Sirhind in March 1748. Having seen off the Afghans, the Mughals appointed Muin ul-Mulk, son of Qamruddin, as governor of Lahore and Multan subahs. Ahmad Shah launched a second invasion later in the year resulting in a peace agreement which gave the revenues of the Chahar Mahal, namely Sialkot, Gujrat, Pasrur and Aurangabad to the Afghans. He then faced a rebellion by first Nazir Khan, the Afghan appointed to collect the revenues of the Chahar Mahal, and later Hayatullah Khan, both at the instigation of the Safdar Jung, the new Mughal wazir based in Delhi. Despite successfully defeating both rebellions, Muin ul-Mulk was then attacked by Ahmad Shah for his failure to pay the revenues of the Chahar Mahal. Lacking support from the central government in Delhi, he again enlisted Sikh mercenaries who had aided him in his previous two campaigns. The protracted conflict with Abdali led to widespread destruction across the subah and in 1752 Muin ul-Mulk was finally defeated by Afghan forces. The subah of Lahore was now annexed by the Afghans, however Muin ul-Mulk was left in place to govern until his death on 4 November 1753. The Mughals continued to claim authority in the subah and appointed their own governor Mir Momin Khan to challenge Afghan authority, even briefly re-occupying the subah in 1756, however they were quickly defeated. For a period Mughlani Begum, the widow of Muin ul-Mulk exercised de facto authority, however, proper Durrani control was established in 1757 and Timur Shah Durrani was placed as viceroy at Lahore. In 1758, the faujdar of Jalandhar Doab, Adina Beg, sought assistance from Marathas and expelled Afghans from the province. However, his untimely death caused Durrani Empire to again occupy it in 1761. By 1765, Ahmad Shah had lost Lahore to a triumvirate of Sikh sardars as well.

== Administration ==
As per the Ain-i-Akbari, the parganas of the Lahore Subah were categorized under doabas or doabs (tract of land located between two rivers), with the residue being assigned to the Birun-i-Panjnad ("outside the five rivers"). However, Habib cautions that this could not have been the official administrative system of the subah but rather was used for general purposes, as it would mean distant areas (for example, locations west of the Indus River or east of the Sutlej River) separated by various divisions would have been part of the same administrative unit, the Birun-i-Panjnad. Another quirk about Lahore Subah's administrative set-up was that dastur circles were not associated with the sarkars, with the dastur-circle boundaries not adhering to the boundaries of the rivers that marked Lahore Subah's divisions.

The province of Lahore was divided into five sarkars (divisions), which in turn were further divided into mahals (districts). The five sarkars were Rechna, Bist Jalandhar, Bari, Sindh Sagar and Jech, as detailed below:

- Sindh Sagar Doab: It consisted of 1,062 square meters. Notable among them were Hazara Qarlugh, Attock, Rohtas, Pindi Gheb, Shamsabad and Khushab.
- Jech Doab: It consisted of 531 square meters, the most notable being Bhimber, Dadyal, Gujrat, Bhera, Malot, and Hazara.
- Rechna Doab: It consisted of 1,441.69 square meters. Notable mahals in the Rechna sarkar included Jammu, Jasrota, Chamba, Sialkot, Pasrur, Zafarwal, Hafizabad, Eminabad, Chiniot and Shorkot.
- Bist Jalandhar Doab: It consisted of 1,518.75 square meters, the most notable being Sultanpur, Nakodar, Mamdot, Bajwara and Jalandhar.
- Bari Doab: It consisted of 1,315.23 square meters the most notable being Kangra, Batala, Pathankot, Lahore, Kasur, and Dipalpur.

The Lahore Subah was divided into the following sarkars as per Irfan Habib's work based on the Ain-i-Akbari:

List of sarkars of Lahore Subah in 1601 as per Irfan Habib (1986) (Note: The area of the sarkars is based on the years 1595–6/1601. The revenue figures are the official estimates for jama or naqdī as per the Ain-i-Akbari. However, the revenue figures do not take into account the regional variations in price-levels. The jama' is stated in dams (a copper coin). At the time of the Ain-i-Akbari one rupee was worth 40 dams.)
No.	Name	Area (km^{2})	Revenue (dams)
1.	Bet Jalandhar Doab	16,348 ^{km2}	124,365,212
2.	Bari Doab	17,756 ^{km2}	142,808,183
3.	Rachnao Doab	35,734 ^{km2}	172,047,391
4.	Chanhat Doab	18,326 ^{km2}	64,502,394
5.	Sind Sagar Doab	51,760 ^{km2}	51,912,201
6.	Birun Panjnad	1,041 ^{km2}	3,822,740
Total for the subah:		140,967 km^{2}	559,458,121

== Government ==
The subah was ruled by a governor, called a subahdar (viceroy). His duties involved maintaining the peace, subduing the northern hill states, hearing cases in court, supervising provincial officers and undertaking works of public utility. Usually a single governor was appointed, however for a brief period during Akbar's reign he appointed two governors in case one came to court or fell ill. Akbar further believed, following his experience with the Atka Khail in the Punjab, that it was necessary to regularly transfer governors to avoid them becoming too powerful. As such, for much of its history, governors only served short terms in the subah.

A diwan was in charge of all financial affairs, and all faujdars, jagirdars, zamindars, amins, karoris and qanungoes, were required to refer revenue matters to the diwan. In 1595 the diwan was made independent of the governor, and placed directly under the control of the diwan-i-ala in the central government.

A provincial bakhshi controlled military affairs. He ensured that the mansabdars fulfilled their duties and issued certificates to that effect. The bakshi was also acted as the official news writer of the subah, reporting all affairs to the central government.

In Lahore, the capital of the subah, a qazi was appointed, who heard cases, carried out investigations, and delivered judgments.

== Economy ==
Under the Mughals, the city of Lahore became one of the largest in the medieval world, with population of 400,000 to 700,000 in the 17th century. In contrast, only three cities in Europe had a population of more than 200,000 in 1600. In his 1670 epic poem Paradise lost, English poet John Milton made reference to Lahore as one of the most prosperous cities which Adam saw from the hill of Paradise, "To Agra and Lahor of Great Mogul — To seat of Mightiest Empires."

=== Weaponry ===
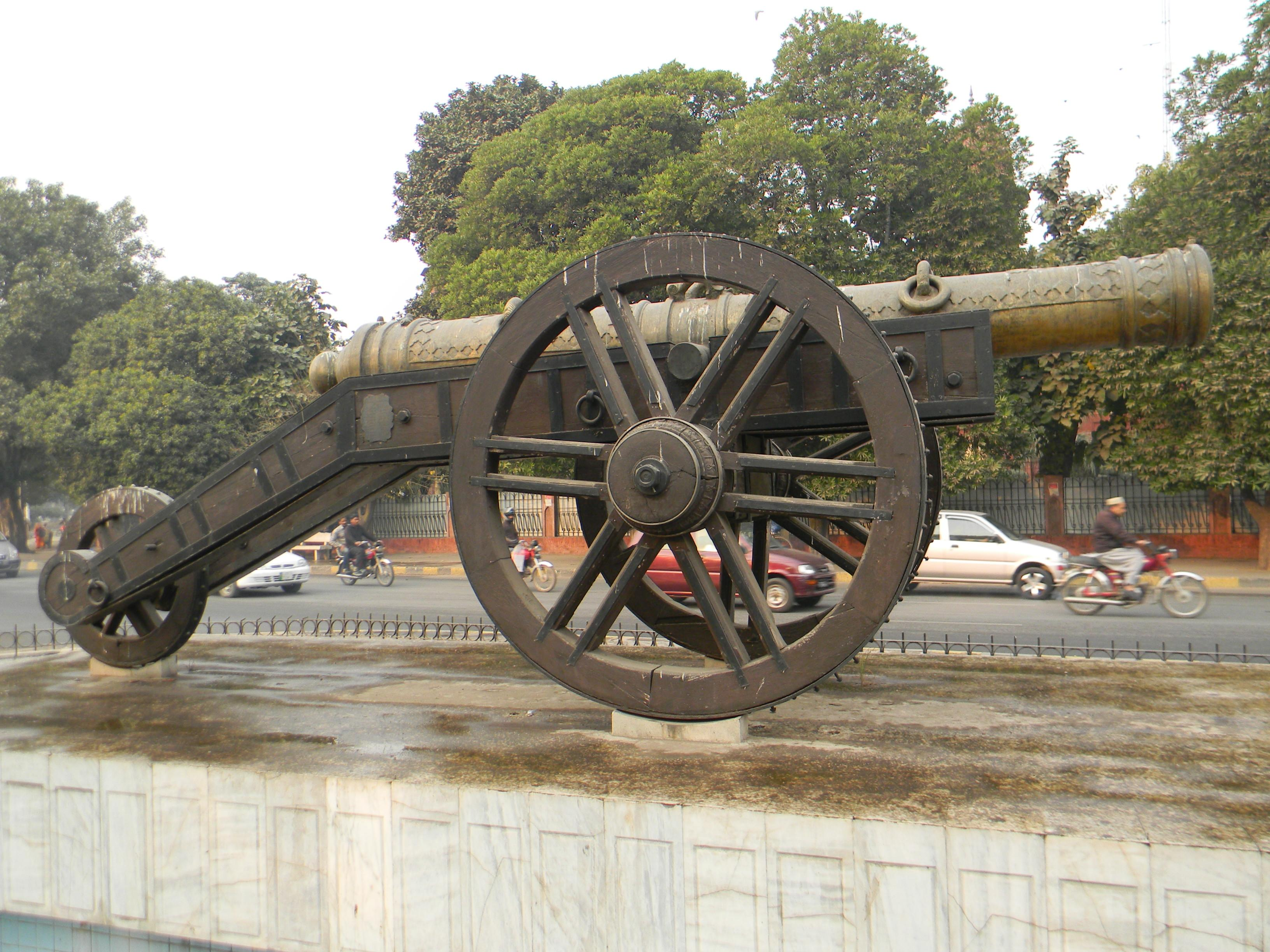
The Zamzama Gun, cast in Lahore in 1757.

Lahore, along with Delhi, was the most important center of production of military equipment of Mughal Empire. In 1757, when the Subah of Lahore came temporarily under control of Ahmed Shah Abdali, the Zamzama cannon was ordered to be cast by Shah Nazir, a metalsmith of the former Mughal viceroy of the Lahore Subah, Muin ul-Mulk. This gun was one of the largest ever made in the subcontinent.

=== Metalwork ===
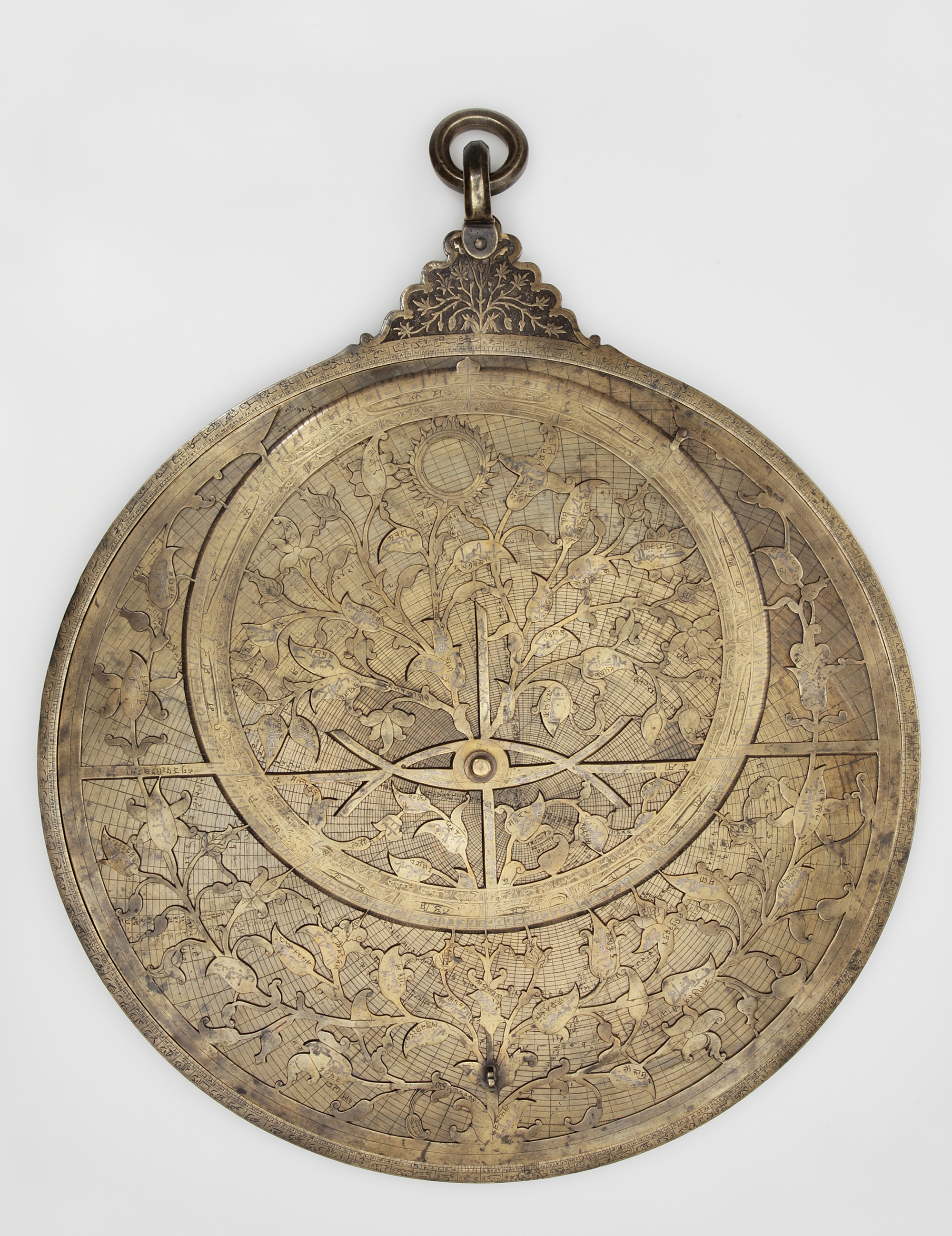
The Khalili astrolabe, made by Ḍiyāʾ al-Dīn Muḥammad, a member of Lahore family of astrolabists, between 1648 and 1658

Lahore was also a major centre of production of seamless steel, especially the famous Wootz steel. The Lahore family of astrolabists produced a large number of astronomical instruments in the 16th and 17th centuries with technical and innovate designs, including dozens of astrolabes and celestial globes.

== Architecture ==
The Lahore Subah, particularly the city of Lahore, has a large number of Mughal-era monuments. Lahore's prosperity and central position has yielded more Mughal monuments in Lahore than either Delhi or Agra. Lahore reached its cultural zenith during this period, with dozens of mosques, tombs, shrines, and urban infrastructure developed during this period. Emperor Jahangir chose to be buried in Lahore, and his tomb was built in Lahore's Shahdara Bagh suburb in 1637 by his wife Nur Jahan, whose tomb is also nearby. His son, Shah Jahan reigned between 1628 and 1658 and was born in Lahore in 1592. He renovated large portions of the Lahore Fort with luxurious white marble and erected the iconic Naulakha Pavilion in 1633. His Punjabi viceroy and physician, Wazir Khan also lavished Lahore with some of its most celebrated and iconic monuments, such as the Shahi Hammam in 1635, and the extravagantly decorated Wazir Khan Mosque in 1641. The Shalimar Gardens were also built during his tenure. The largest of Lahore's Mughal monuments was raised during reign of emperor Aurangzeb, the Badshahi Mosque in 1673, as well as the Alamgiri Gate of the Lahore Fort in 1674.

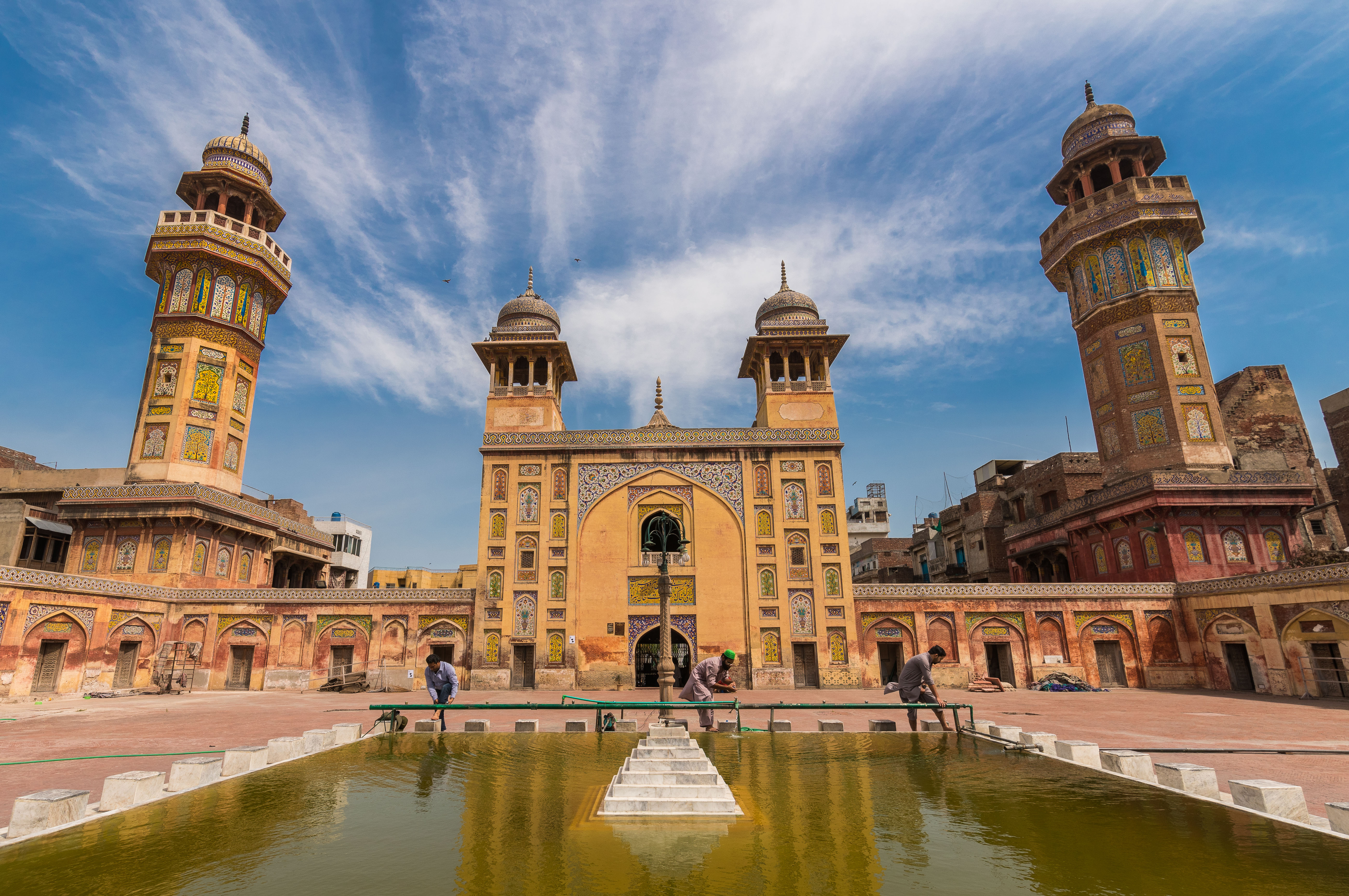
Wazir Khan Mosque

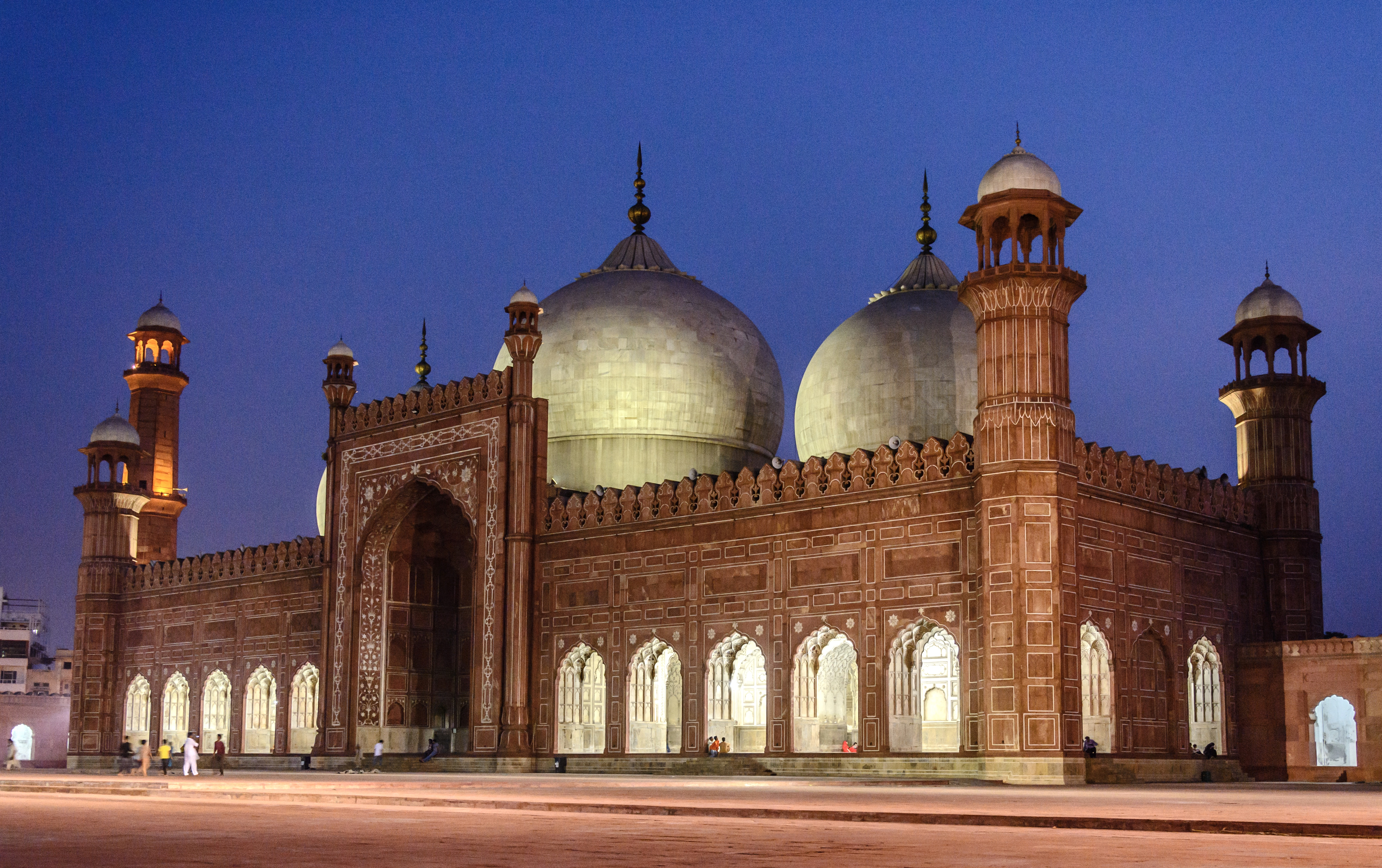
Badshahi Mosque

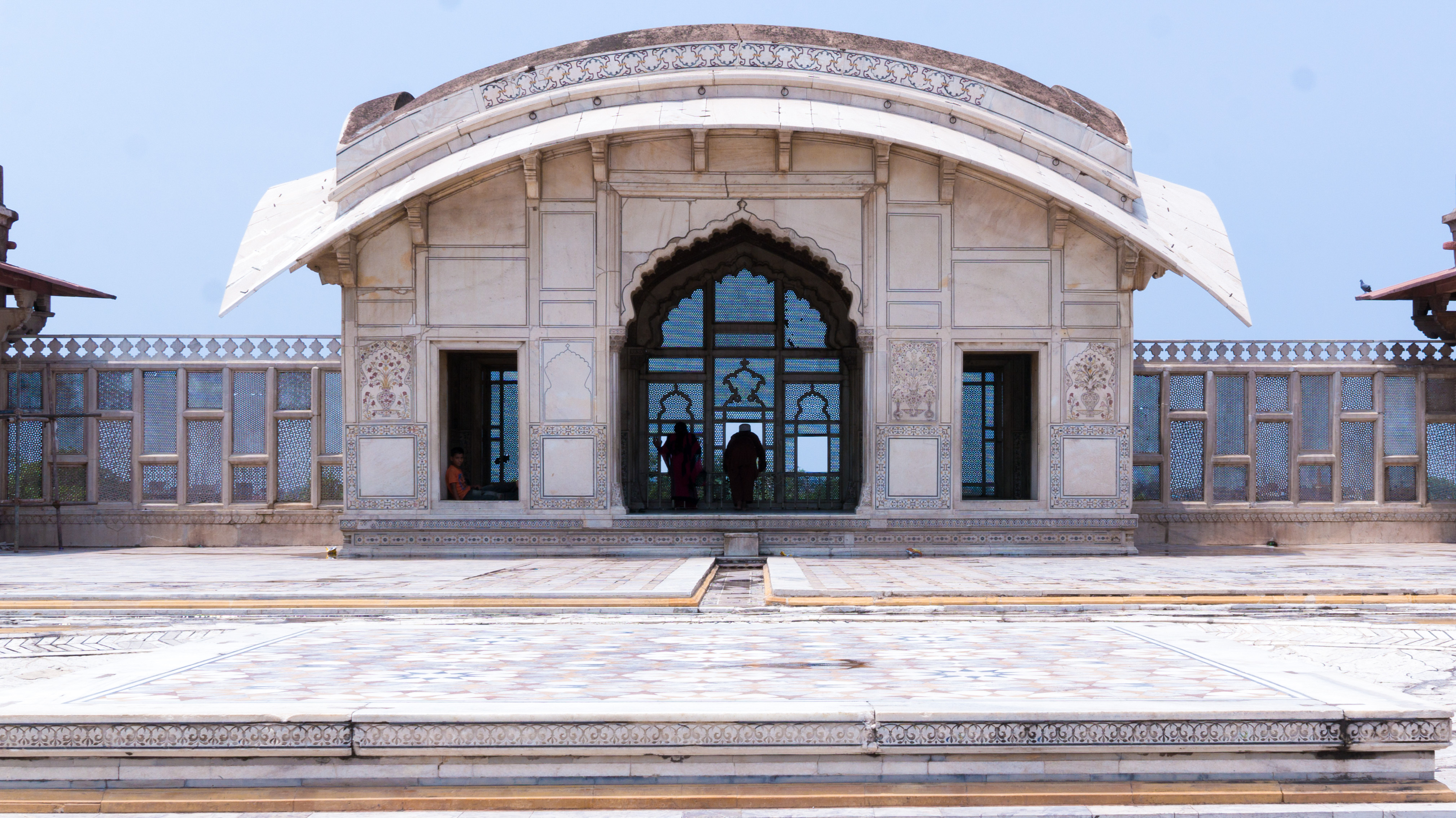
Naulakha pavilion

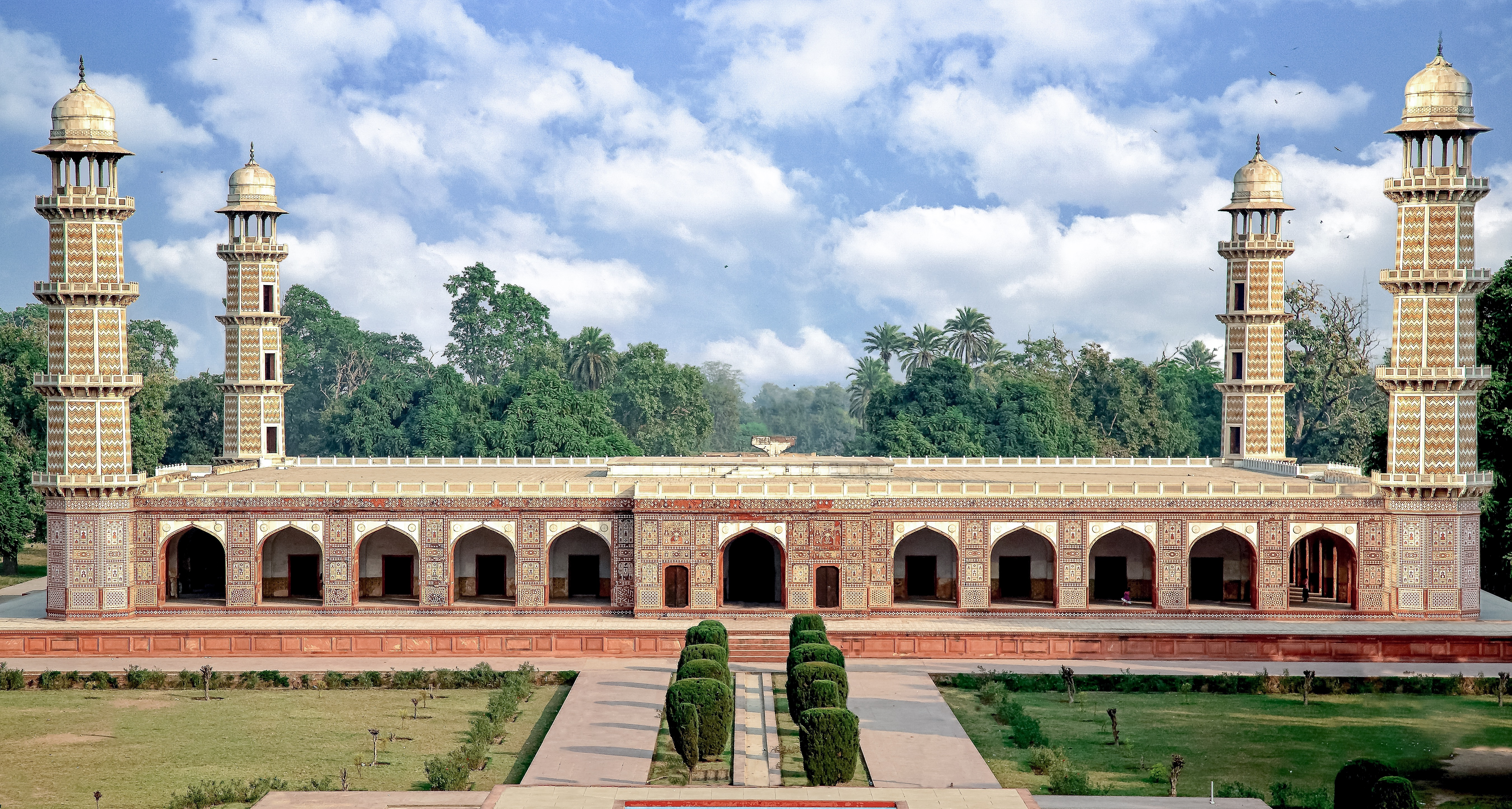
Tomb of Jahangir

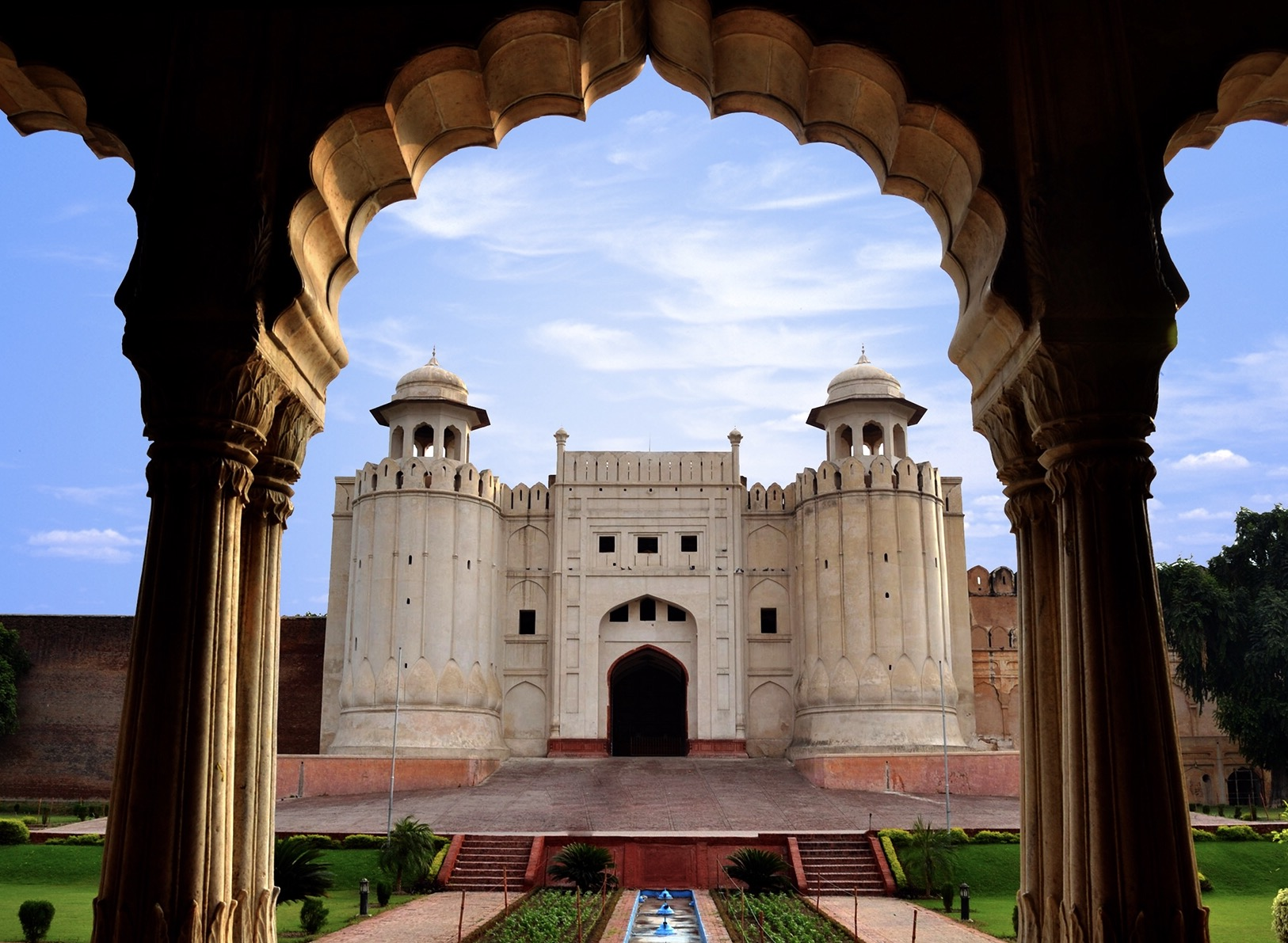
Lahore Fort

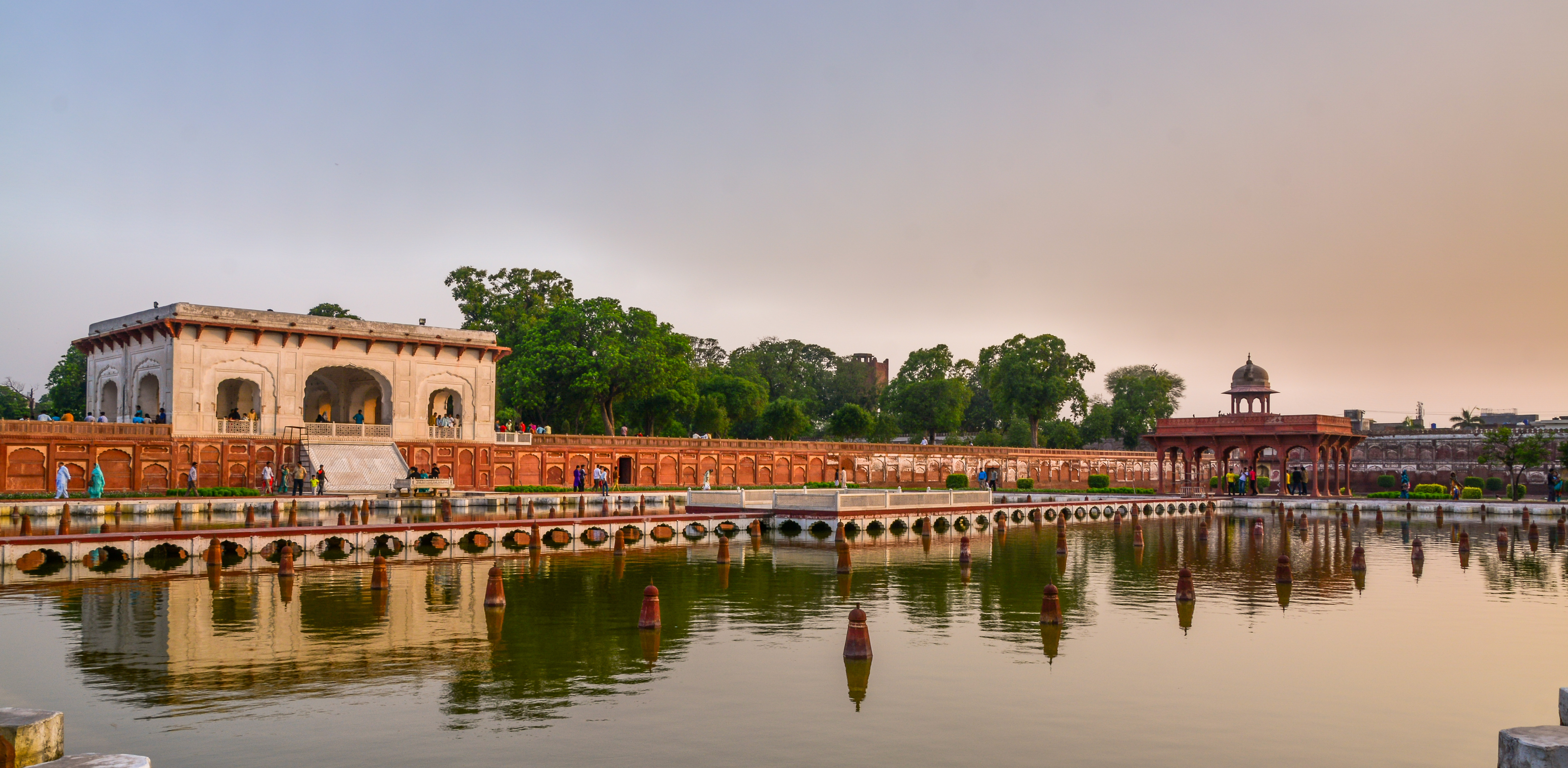
Shalimar Gardens

== List of governors ==
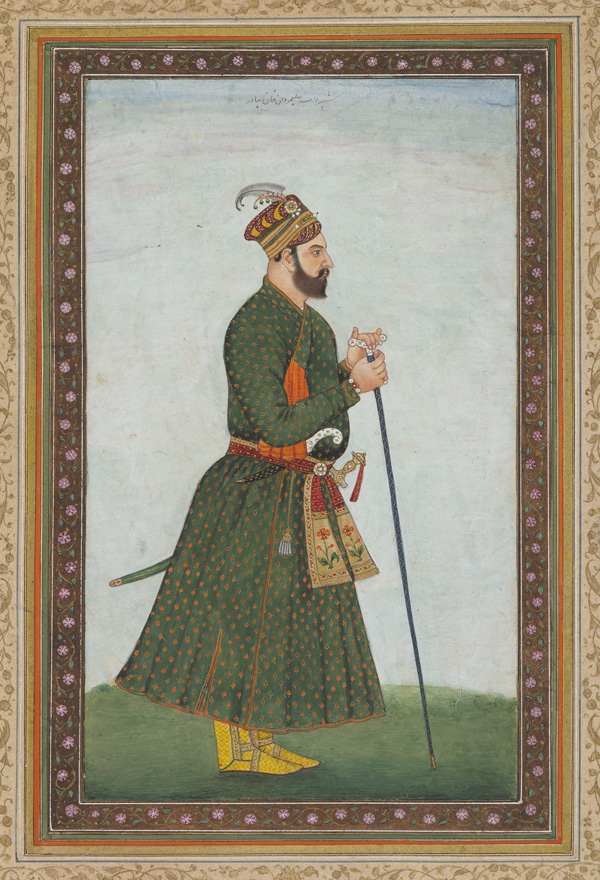
Portrait of Ali Mardan Khan

The following is a list of notable governors of Lahore subah appointed by the central Mughal government.

16th century

- Said Khan (c. 1580–1583)
- Raja Bhagwan Das (c. 1583–1589)
- Rai Singh (jointly with Bhagwan Das; 1587–1599)
- Khawaja Shamsuddin Khawafi (c. 1599–1602)

17th century

- Qulij Khan Andajani (c. 1602–1605)
- Ibrahim Khan (c. 1605–1607)
- Qulij Khan Andajani (c. 1607–1611)
- Shaikh Farid Murtaza (c. 1611–1616)
- Itmad-ud-Daula (1616–1624; through his naibs)
- Asaf Khan (1624–1628)
- Wazir Khan (1628–1638)
- Mutamad Khan (1638–1639)
- Ali Mardan Khan (1639–1640)
- Said Khan Bahadur (1640–1643)
- Qulij Khan (1643–1645)
- Dara Shikoh (1645–1651; through his naibs)

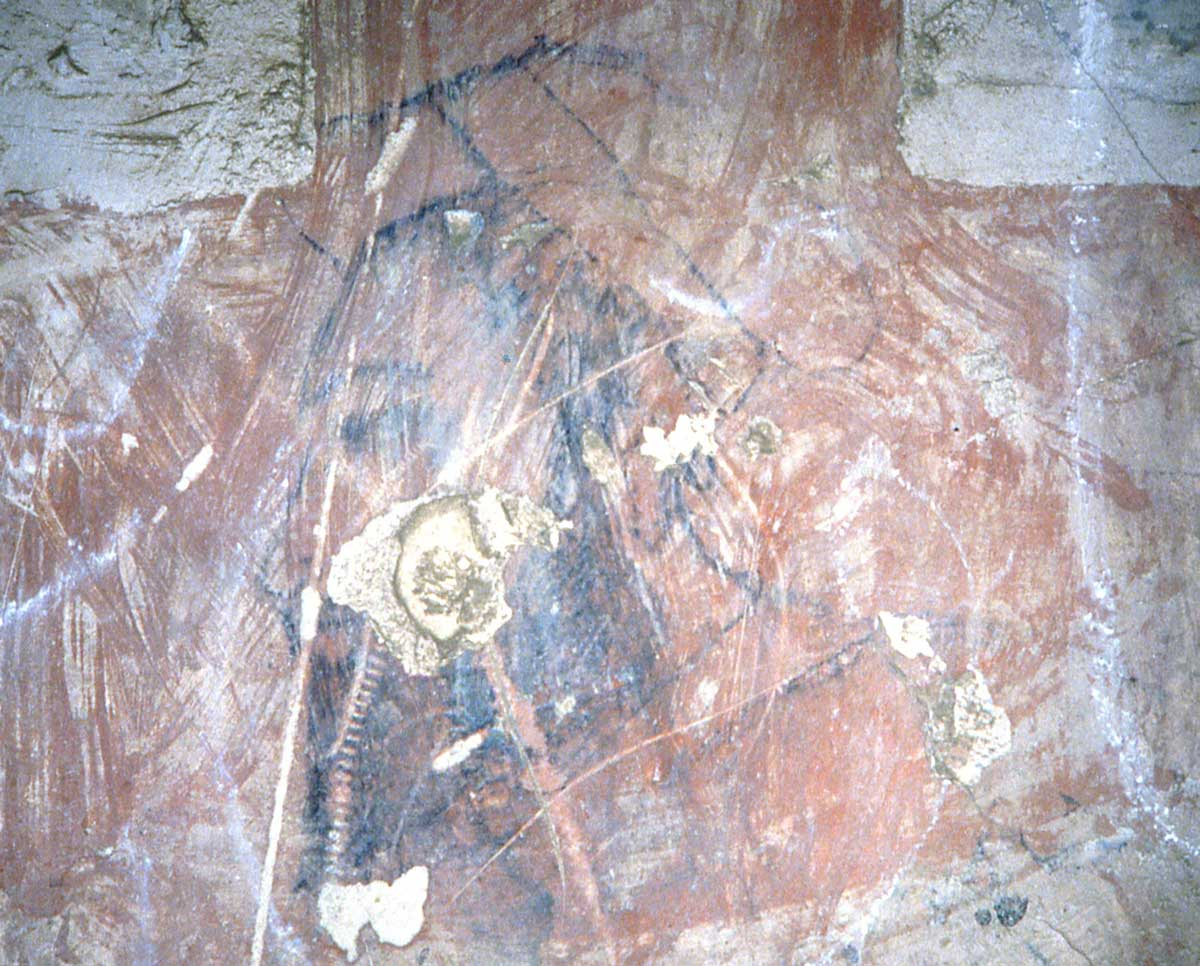
Defaced mural of possibly a Mughal prince, likely Dara Shikoh, from the Sedari on the north wall of Lahore Fort, Punjab, circa 17th century

- Shaikh Abdul Karim (1651–1655)
- Khwaja Muin Khan (1655–1656)
- Bahadur Khan (1656–1657)
- Izzat Khan (1657–1658)
- Khalilulah Khan (1658–1662)
- Ibrahim Khan (1662–1667)
- Muhammad Amin Khan (1667–1668)
- Danishmand Khan (1668–1672)
- Fidai Khan (1672–1675)
- Amanat Khan (1675–1678)
- Qawamuddin Khan (1678–1680)
- Muhammad Azam Shah (1680–1683)
- Mir Ishaq (1683–1686)
- Sipahdar Khan (1686–1688)
- Mahabat Khan (1688–1690)
- Muhammad Azam Shah (1690–1691)
- Bahadur Khan (1691–1693)
- Mukarram Khan (1693–1697)
- Abu Nasr Khan (1697–1700)

18th century

- Bahadur Shah I (1700–1705)
- Zabardast Khan (1705)
- Bahadur Shah I (1705–1707)
- Munim Khan II (as agent-governor inspectoring Prince Muazzam in 1700–1705, then with Muazzam in 1705–1707)
- Abd al-Samad Khan (1713–1726)
- Zakariyah Khan (1726–1745)
- Mir Momin Khan (1745)
- Yahya Khan (1745–1747)
- Shah Nawaz Khan (1747–1748)
- Muin ul-Mulk (1748–1753)
- Mughlani Begum (1753–1756; de-facto, as Durrani vassal)
- Timur Shah Durrani (1756–1758; Durrani vassal)
- Adina Beg (1758; last governor of Punjab)

== See also ==
- Subah of Multan
- History of Punjab
- Mughal period in Lahore
