= Subah of Multan =

Subdivision of the Mughal Empire between 1580–1752

Multan Subah
- 1580–1752
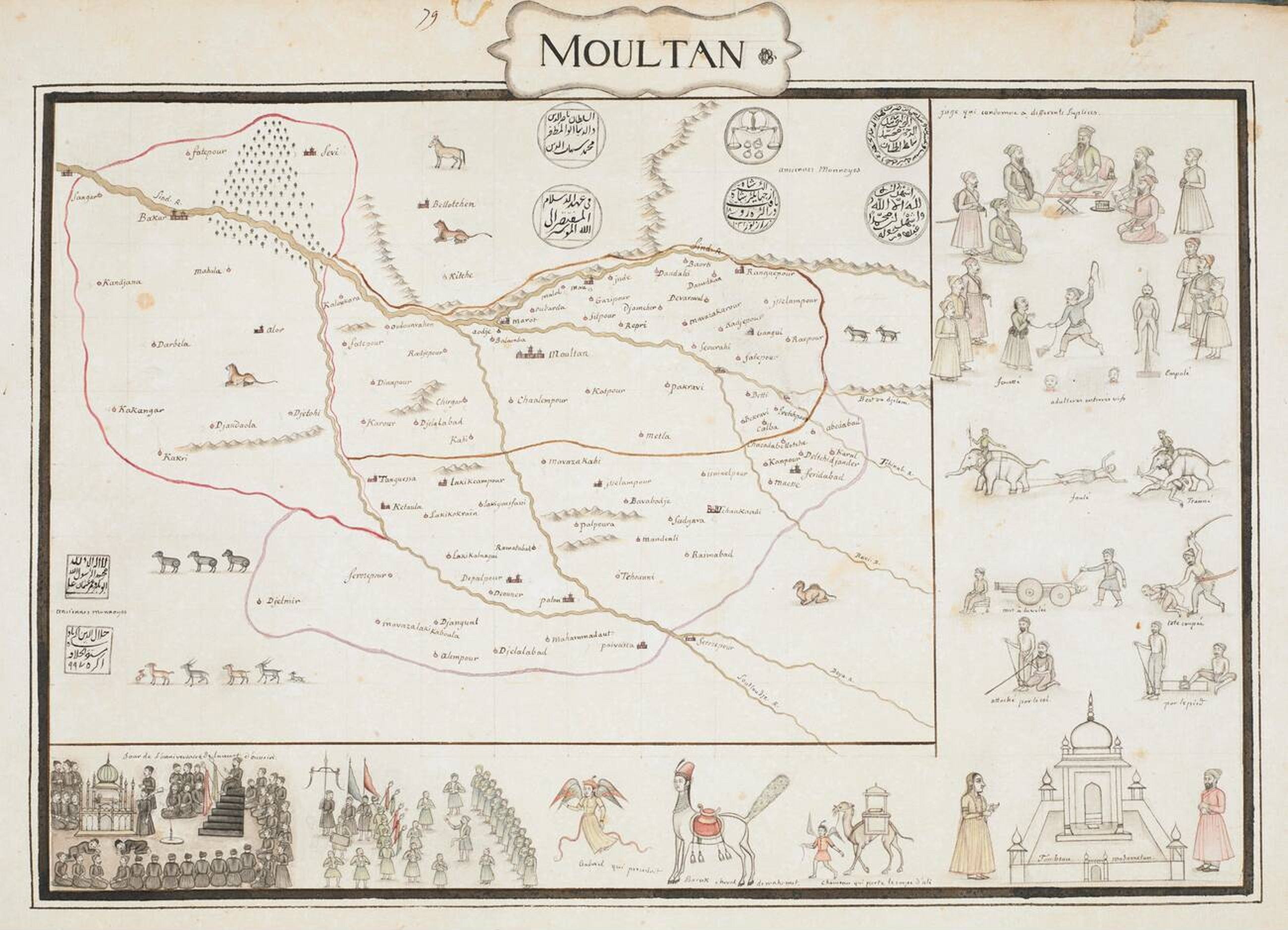
- Elaborately illustrated map of the Multan Subah of the Mughal Empire, commissioned by Jean Baptiste Joseph Gentil, ca.1770
- Capital: Multan
- Historical era: Early modern period
  - Established: 1580
  - Disestablished: 1752

Area
  - 1601: 170,500 km^{2} (65,800 sq mi)
Preceded by	Succeeded by
Mughal Empire	Durrani Empire
- Today part of: Pakistan; India

The Subah of Multan (Punjabi: ملتان دا صوبہ, romanized: Multān Dā Sūbāh; Persian: صوبه ملتان, romanized: Sūbāh-ey-Multān) was one of the three subahs (provinces) of the Mughal Empire in the Punjab region, alongside Lahore and Delhi subahs. It was also amongst the original twelve Mughal provinces, encompassing southern parts of Punjab, stretching towards parts of the regions of Pashtunistan and Balochistan, bordering Kandahar Province and the Persian Safavid Empire. It was one of the largest and most important provinces of the Mughal Empire. The province was annexed by Durrani Empire in 1752, with Ali Mohammad Khakwani as its first Durrani governor.

== Geography ==
The subah of Multan was bordered to the north by the Lahore Subah and Kabul Subah, to the west by the Safavid Empire and for some time the Kandahar Subah, to the east by the Ajmer Subah and Delhi Subah, and to the south by the Thatta Subah.

== History ==
The Subah of Multan was one of twelve administrative divisions created by the Mughal Emperor Akbar in 1580. Multan city acted as the capital of the Multan Subah according to the Ain-i-Akbari.

== Economy ==
Under Mughal rule, Multan enjoyed 200 years of peace in a time when the city became known as Dar al-Aman ("Abode of Peace"). During the Mughal era, Multan was an important centre of agricultural production and manufacturing of cotton textiles. Multan was a centre for currency minting, as well as tile-making during the Mughal era.

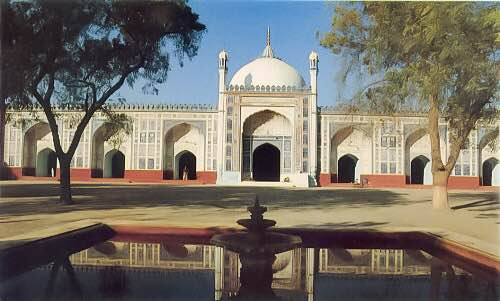
Multan's Shahi Eid Gah Mosque dates from 1735 and is decorated with elaborate and intricate Mughal era frescoes.

Multan would remain an important trading centre until the city was ravaged by repeated invasions in the 18th and 19th centuries in the post-Mughal era. Many of Multan's merchants then migrated to Shikarpur in Sindh, and were found throughout Central Asia up until the 19th century.

Multan was also host to the offices of many commercial enterprises during the Mughal era, even in times when the Mughals were in control of the even more coveted city of Kandahar, given the unstable political situation resulting from frequent contestation of Kandadar with the Persian Safavid Empire.

== Administrative divisions ==
The Multan Subah was divided into sarkars (equivalent to districts), with them being as follows as per the Ain-i-Akbari:

List of sarkars of Multan Subah in 1601 (Note: The area of the sarkars is based on the years 1595–6/1601. The revenue figures are the official estimates for jama or naqdī as per the Ain-i-Akbari. However, the revenue figures do not take into account the regional variations in price-levels. The jama' is stated in dams (a copper coin). At the time of the Ain-i-Akbari one rupee was worth 40 dams.)
No.	Name	Revenue (dams)
1.	Multan Sarkar	53,216,318
2.	Dipalpur Sarkar	78,562,285
3.	Bhakkar Sarkar	18,424,947
Total for the subah:		150,203,550

The sarkars were subdivided into pargannahs (equivalent to sub-districts or tehsils).

== List of governors ==
The following is a list of notable governors of Multan subah appointed by the central Mughal government.

16th century

- Syed Hamid Bukhari (c. 1580–1587)
- Sadiq Khan (c. 1587–1590)
- Muhib Ali Khan (c. 1590–1594)
- Rustam Mirza (c. 1594–1602)
- Said Khan (c. 1602–1605)

17th century

- Mirza Ghazi Beg (c. 1605–1606)
- Tashi Beg (c. 1606–1611)
- Abdul Nabi Uzbek (1611–1613)
- Baqir Khan Najam Sani (1613–1620)
- Khan Jahan Lodi (1620–1624)
- Asaf Khan (c. 1624–1631)
- Qulij Khan Turrani (1631–1638)
- Yusuf Khan (1638–1639)
- Najabat Khan (1639–1641)
- Qulij Khan Turrani (1641–1642)
- Said Khan Bahadur (1642–1643)
- Murad Baksh (1643–1646)
- Said Khan Bahadur (1646–1647)
- Bahadur Khan Rohela (1647–1649)
- Aurangzeb (1649–1653)
- Dara Shikoh (1653–1657)
- Lashkar Khan (1658)
- Tarbiat Khan (1658–1667)
- Saif Khan (1667–1668)
- Tahir Khan (1668–1669)
- Lashkar Khan (1669–1671)
- Mubariz Khan (1671–1672)
- Khwaja Abid Khan (1672–1674
- Diler Khan (1674–1676)
- Muhammad Azam Shah (1676–1678)
- Muhammad Akbar (1678–1687)
- Mir Ashiq (1687–1695)
- Allahyar Khan (1695–1696)

18th century

- Abdus Samad Khan (1726–1737)
- Zakariya Khan (1737–1745)
- Shah Nawaz Khan (1745–1747)
- Zahid Khan (1747–1748)
- Kaura Mal (1748–1751)

== See also ==
- Subah of Lahore
- History of Punjab
