= Moin-ul-Mulk =

Subahdar of Lahore from 1748 to 1753

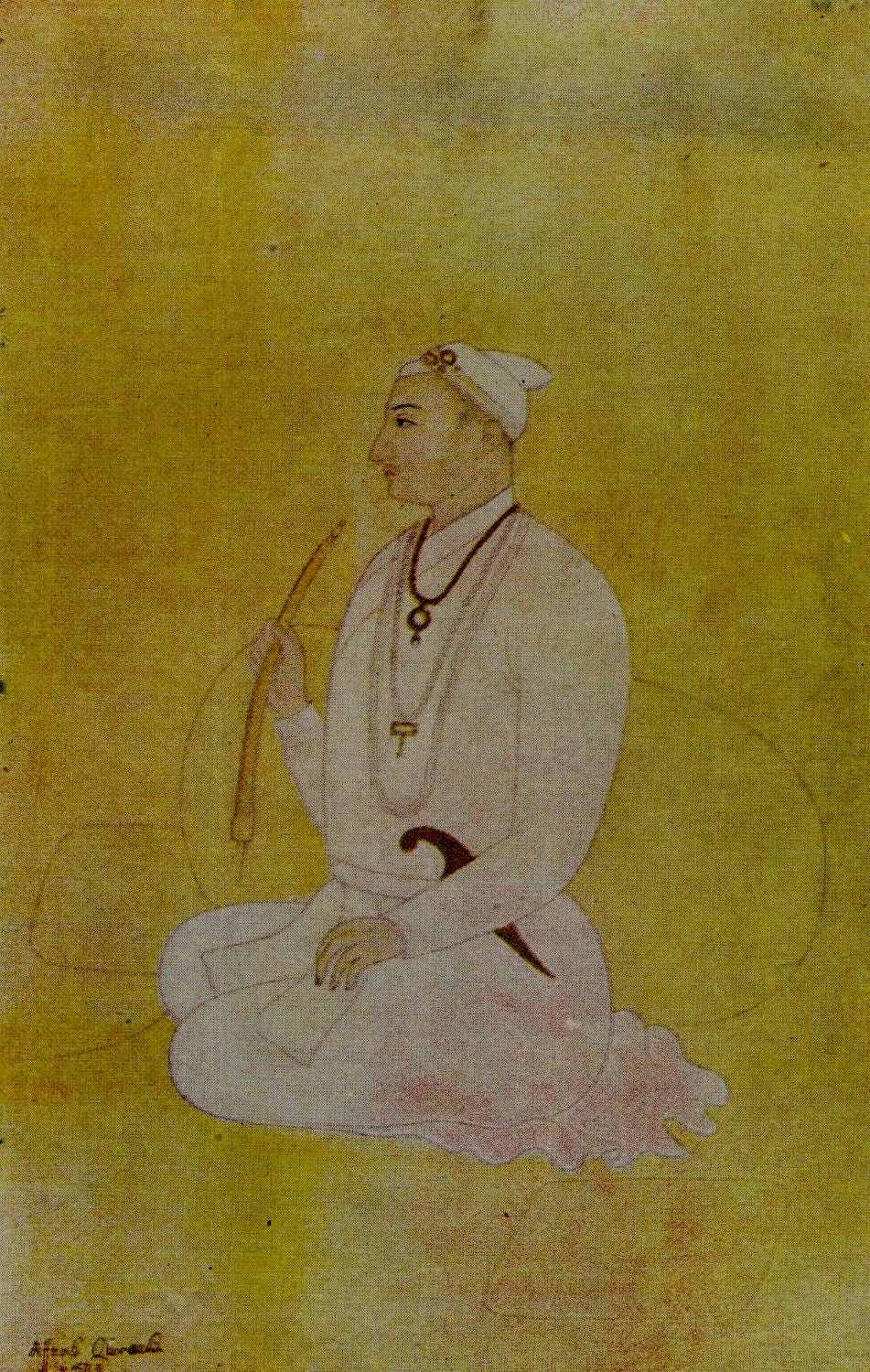
- Portrait of Moin-ul-Mulk by Aftab Mussawar

Subahdar of Lahore
- In office 11 April 1748 – 3 November 1753
- Monarchs: Ahmad Shah Bahadur (1748–1752); Ahmad Shah Durrani (1752–1753)
- Preceded by: Shah Nawaz Khan
- Succeeded by: Mir Momin Khan (de-jure); Mughlani Begum (de-facto)

Personal details
- Died: 3 November 1753
- Spouse: Mughlani Begum
- Children: Umda Begum; Muhammad Amin Khan
- Parent: Itimad-ad-Daula, Qamar-ud-Din Khan (father)

Military service
- Battles/wars: Mughal-Sikh wars Indian campaign of Ahmad Shah Durrani

Moin-ul-Mulk, also known by his title Mir Mannu (died 1753), was the Mughal and later Durrani governor of the Punjab between 1748 and 1753.

== Early life ==
Moin-ul-Mulk was the son of Qamar-ud-Din Khan, Grand Vizier of the Mughal Empire, and younger brother of Intizam-ud-Daulah. His father had been the brother-in-law of Zakaria Khan.

== Subahdar of Lahore ==
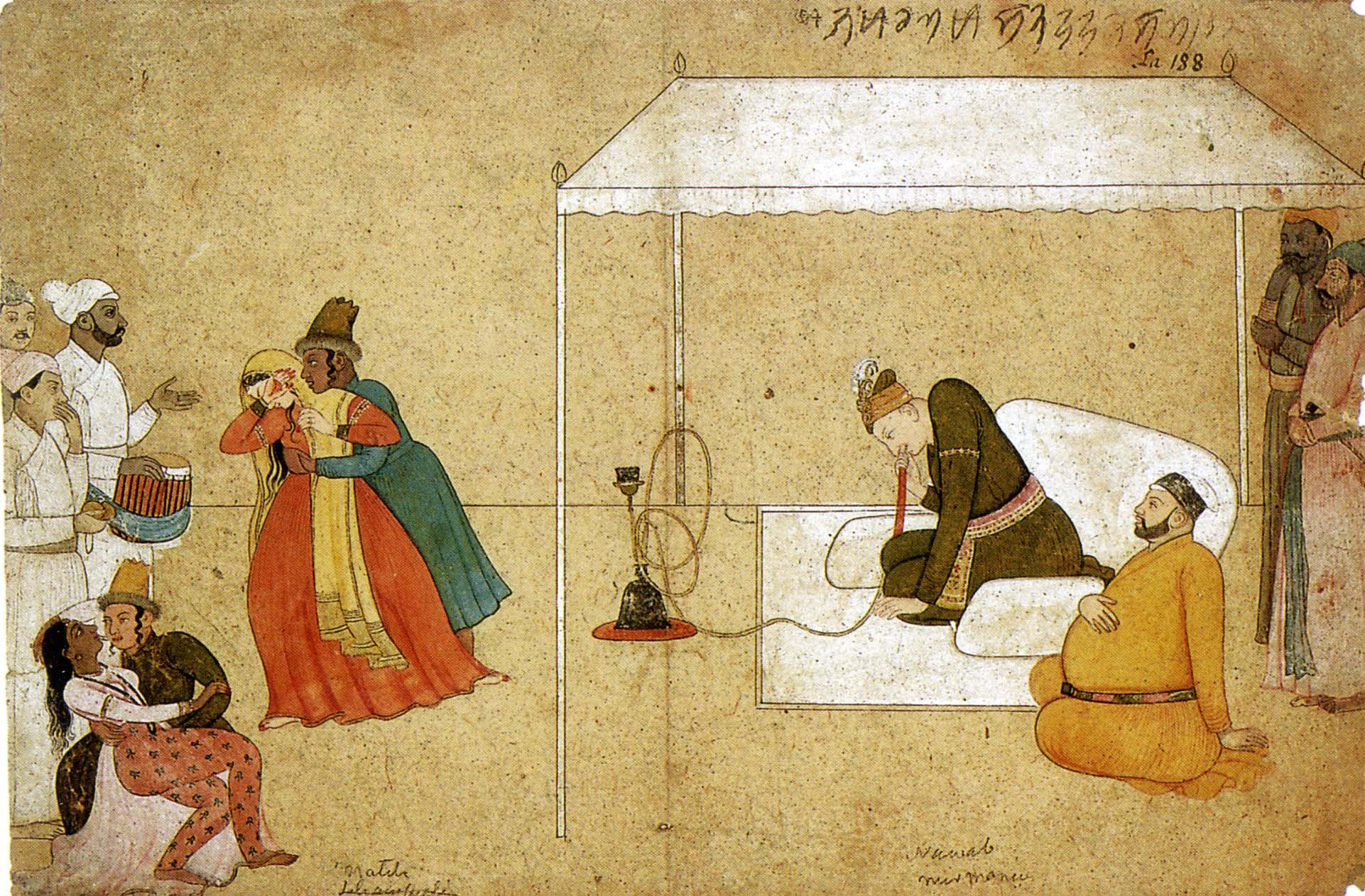
Moin-ul-Mulk (also known as Mir Mannu), Subahdar of Lahore (in green) in his darbar smoking a hookah. Painted by Nainsukh of Guler, circa 18th century

In March 1748, Moin-ul-Mulk successfully commanded troops in the defeat of Ahmad Shah Durrani at the Battle of Manupur. During the campaign, his father was struck and killed by a cannonball whilst encamped and praying. In battle he held the Mughal vanguard until reinforcements arrived from Safdar Jung, subsequently making a bold dash of cavalry which resulted in the routing of Durrani's forces.

After Durrani's retreat to Afghanistan, Moin-ul-Mulk was made governor of the Subah of Lahore on 11 April 1748 by Muhammad Shah Rangila. The appointment of Moin-ul-Mulk was opposed by the new wazir Safdar Jung.

Soon into Moin-ul-Mulk's reign in the Punjab, Durrani launched a second invasion in December 1749. Despite requests to Delhi, the Mughal government led by Safdar Jung refused to send reinforcements to his aid. Realising he could not defeat the Afghans, he opened negotiations. The terms of the treaty promised revenue from the Chahar Mahal region, namely Sialkot, Gujrat, Pasrur and Aurangabad to the Afghans.

In 1751–52, Durrani launched his third invasion on the pretext of non-payment of revenue from the Chahar Mahal region. Moin-ul-Mulk concentrated his forces by requesting troops from Kaura Mal in Multan and Adina Beg in Jalandhar. His army additionally consisted of 20,000 Sikh troops. Moin-ul-Mulk knew he would need the help of Sikhs to defeat Durrani. So he had started to give them land and stopped killing and hunting them. But once the war was over he went back to hunting the Sikhs and their families. Bringing in chained women and children to be tortured and put to death. Moin-ul-Mulk led his troops across the Ravi River to confront Afghan troops under Jahan Khan and Durrani. However instead of joining up with Jahan Khan, Durrani detoured to Lahore from the north-east. Moin-ul-Mulk retreated to Lahore where he entrenched his forces outside the city walls. Durrani besieged Lahore for four months, causing widespread devastation in the surrounding areas. Again no reinforcements were sent from Delhi and no Mughal noble came to Moin-ul-Mulk's aid, resulting in his defeat on 6 March 1752. In the resulting peace agreement ratified by the Mughal emperor on 13 April, the subahs of Lahore and Multan were ceded to the Durrani Empire. Impressed by Moin-ul-Mulk's bravery during the siege, Durrani conferred on him the title Farzand Khan Bahadur Rustam-e-Hind and reinstated him as governor of Lahore, albeit now on his behalf.

== Death ==
During a hunt, he died under mysterious circumstances. Moin-ul-Mulk died on 3 November 1753 after being thrown from his horse. Durrani's three-year-old son, Mahmud Khan, succeeded as the Afghan governor of Lahore and Multan, with Moin-ul-Mulk's two-year-old son, Muhammad Amin Khan, as his deputy. In reality power was exercised through Moin-ul-Mulk's widow Mughlani Begum. After his death, the Punjab hastened into turmoil as competing groups vied for political supremacy in Lahore, Multan and Delhi. His property, including slaves, fell into the possession of his widow Mughlani Begum.

== Tomb ==
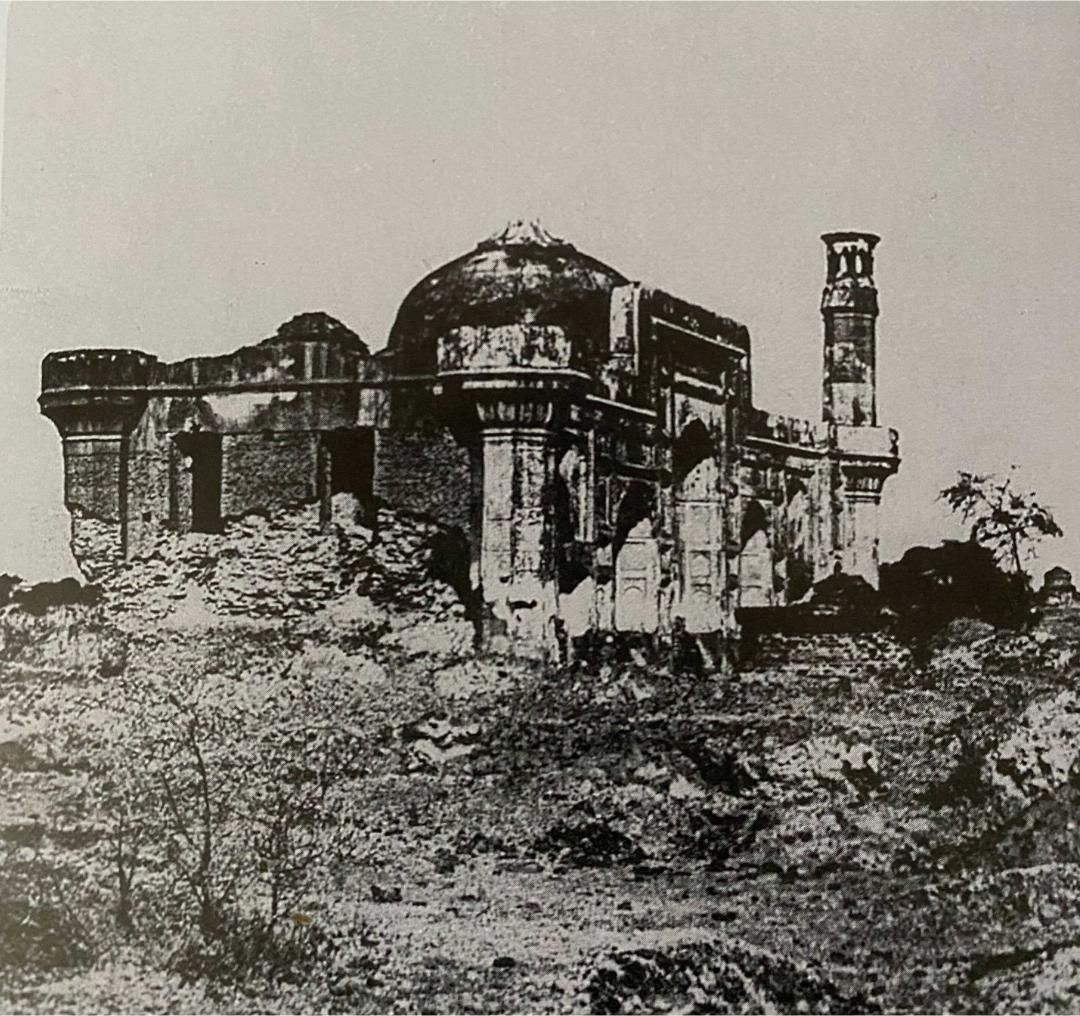
Photograph of Mir Mannu's tomb in the Shahidganj suburb of Lahore, Punjab, ca.1885

A tomb was constructed for Mir Mannu in Lahore near Shahidganj and the later railway station. During Sikh-rule, the tomb was opened up by Raja Hira Singh due to the belief that there was treasure in it. Later, the tomb was turned into a wine-mercant's shop called Gurdit Singh and Co., General Merchants and Rum Agents.

== In popular culture ==
Indian film director Surjit Singh Sethi made Mughlani Begum, a 1979 Punjabi-language film about the Begum and Mir Mannu.

== Gallery ==
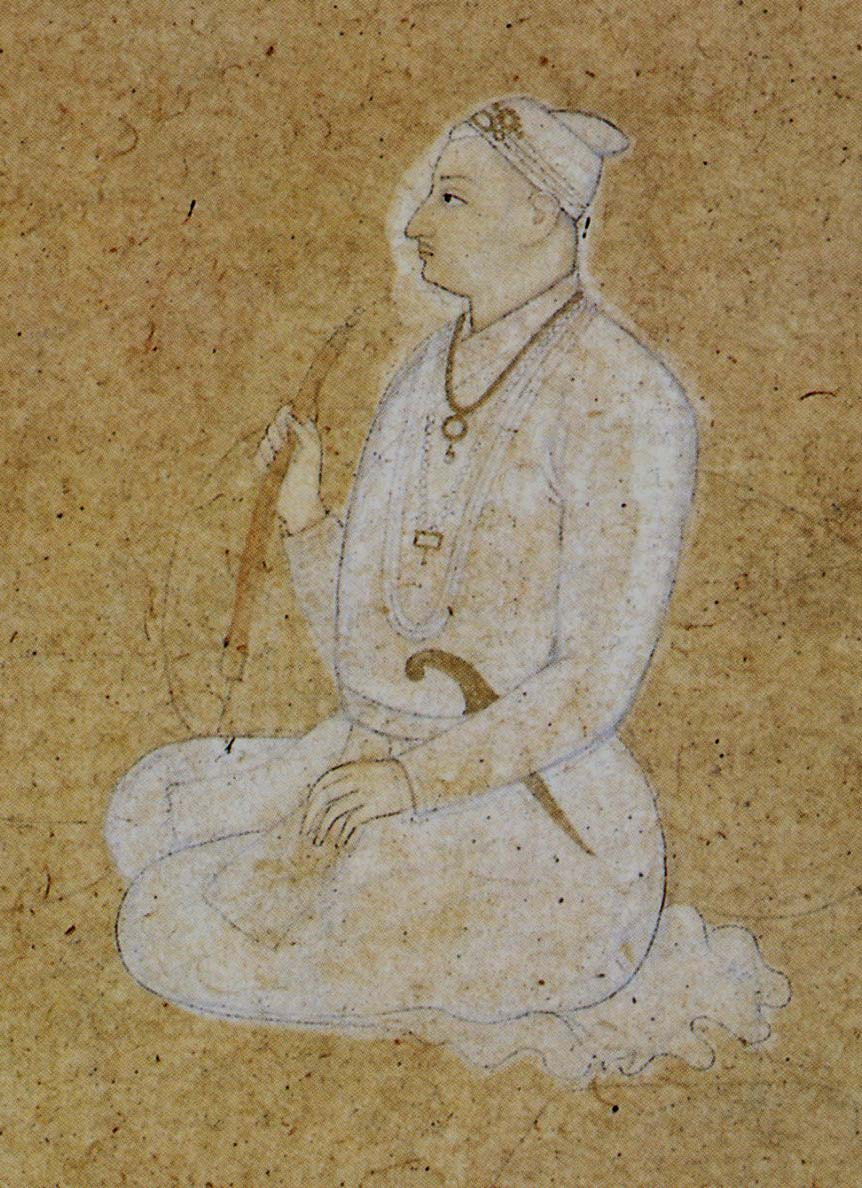
Painting of Mian-Moin-ul-Mulk (Mir Mannu)

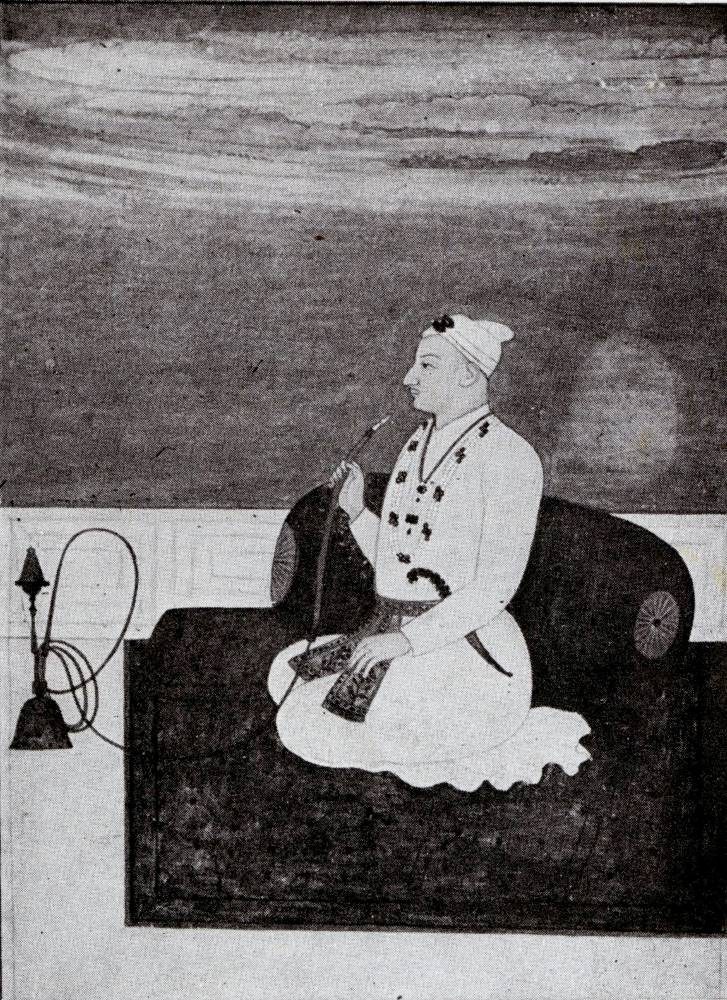
Miniature painting of Mian-Moin-ul-Mulk (Mir Mannu) smoking hookah
