= Hindal =

Sikh religious leader

Hindal (1573 – 1646/1648), also spelt as Handal or Hundal, was a Sikh religious leader. A sect associated with him later arose, with the group producing their own literature, such as a janamsakhi tradition, the Hindaliya Janam Sakhi. However, the sect was not as influential as the Minas.

== Biography ==
He was a Jatt who was born as Sukh Ram Hundal, being the son of father Gaji and mother Sukkhi of Jandiala (near Amritsar). He would marry a woman named Uttami, daughter of a Chahal Jatt named Hamza. Originally a follower of Sakhi Sarwar (Sultani cult), Hindal was converted to Sikhism due to the missionary work of the third Sikh guru, Guru Amar Das. Hindal, remembered as being a man of few-words and meditative, served Guru Amar Das (receiving the Sikh initiation from the third guru) at the langar and was responsible for the collection of dasvandh at Goindwal, and later served Guru Ram Das. As per Suraj Prakash, after an act of devotion, Guru Ram Das instructed Hindal to return to his native village of Jandiala, where he had been appointed as the masand for that manji, to spread Sikhism there. Hindal spread Sikhism in the Jandiala region of Amritsar district by using the word Niranjan ("bright one"), with the utterance Niranjan-Niranjan being associated to Hindal, used to refer to the divine. Hindal engaged in farming and clerical work. Jandiala was a kasba (small settlement). His followers came to be known as the Hindalis or Niranjanias ("unsullied ones"). Hindal lived to an old-age and died either as an orthodox Sikh as per some accounts or as a heretical leader, as per other traditions, being succeeded by his son, Bidhi Chand.

== Hindalis ==
According to Joginder Singh, Hindal did not remain an orthodox Sikh and created his own sect with its own guru-gaddi running parallel to the mainstream one, with the leaders being known as gurus or mahants. However, other sources claim the sect was founded by the son and successor of Hindal, named Bidhi Chand. According to the former version, Hindal began to style himself as a guru at Jandiala, with his popularity growing to such as a level that the settlement of Jandiala became known as Jandiala Guru (or Guru-ka-Jandiala), with guru appended to its name. The 20-30 villages surrounding Jandiala became the area of influence for the Hindali sect. Hindali constructed a two-story and tunneled shrine at Jandiala, which had been decorated with frescoes of Hindali verses, which was known as Sri Darbar Sahib, Janamasthan Baba Hindal. Another revered site for the sect is the Nathoana shrine, known as Tap Asthan Baba Hindal Ji, located near Nathoana Gate in Jandiala Guru. At this site, it is believed that Hindal met a yogi named Purush and received religious education from him. However, as per Joginder Singh, the Nathoana shrine actually was originally a mukam (place) associated with Sakhi Sarwar that Hindal had destroyed. There there was a pond called Nathoana Tobha, which Hindal used to bathe in, making it become marked as a sarovar. Afterwards, the current shrine complex was constructed over it.

Over-time, the Sikh sect became Islamized, although the sect was also influenced by Hinduism. The verses attributed to Hindal became bani to the sect, with these works consisting of praises of Hari/Har, Akal Purakh, and Nirankar aspects of the divine. The works of Hindal also touched upon the relationship the creator and creation, discussing the concept of maya and remembrance of the name. Also, the names of Hindu deities and Muslim saints (pirs and auliyas) are recorded and referred to as prophets of God (Niranjan or Akal Purakh), acting as his messengers. They had their own form of the ardas supplicatory prayer, which personifies attributes of God as being also the attributes of Hindal, and in the prayer they call upon the sants, mahants, tapassavis, bhaktas, and shaheeds. They preferred to call the prayer ardasa instead of ardas and in it they refer to satnam as sachnam.

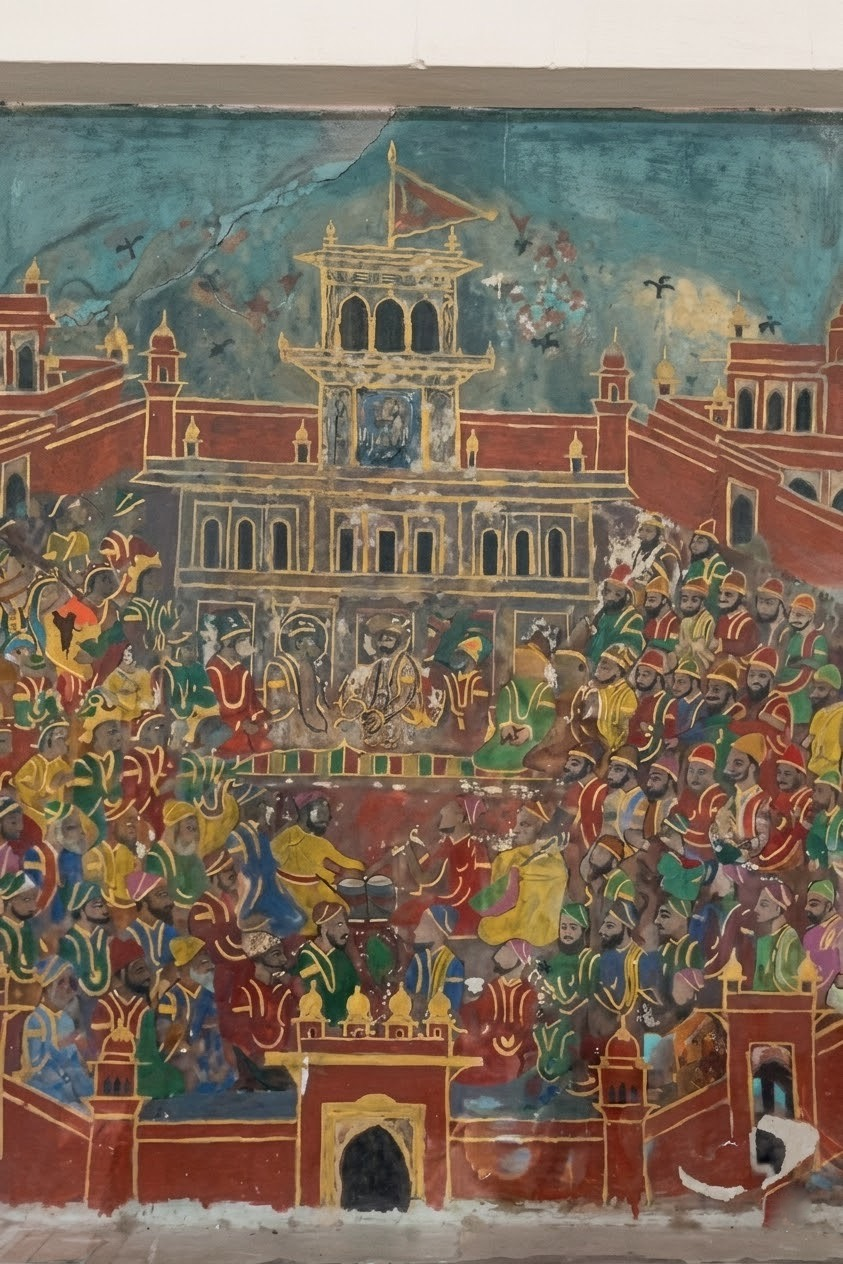
Mural depicting the heretical Hindali sect of Sikhism, showing a courtly (darbar) scene, perhaps with leaders of the sect. The fresco is located within Gurdwara Janam Asthan Guru Baba Handaal Ji at Gali Darbar sahib, Baba Handal Road, Jandiala Guru, Jandiala, Punjab, India

Another version of the sect's history states that Bidhi Chand (not to be confused with another Sikh with the same name), son of Hindal, succeeded his father as the masand of the Jandiala manji, and that Hindal had remained a staunch Sikh. Whilst initially Bidhi Chand was aligned with the mainstream Sikhs, he married a Muslim woman, which the Sikhs admonished him for and he lost his Sikh following, turning him into an apostate, creating the schism between the Niranjanias and the Sikhs. Bidhi Chand went against the mainstream lineage of Sikh guruship, attempting to undermine the guruship of Guru Hargobind, with him establishing a sect by compiling his own granth and janamsakhi that exalted his father Hindal and demoted Guru Nanak. The sect compiled the Hindaliya Janam Sakhi, a plaigerised version of the Bhai Bala Janamsakhi tradition associated with Bala, with the Hindali janamsakhi portraying Guru Nanak as a mere follower/disciple of the low-caste Muslim weaver, Kabir, portraying a meeting between the two at Varanasi, and replacing the name of Nanak in the janamsakhis with the name Hindal. One edition of their janamsakhi claims Guru Nanak requested seignorial rights over the daughter of Guru Angad. However, later editions and manuscripts of the Bhai Bala Janamsakhi tradition would remove much of the material from the text that had been influenced by the Hindalis in the earlier manuscripts of the Bala tradition. It is debated by scholars if the Hindalis were the creators of the Bala janamsakhi tradition or had interfered with an existing literary tradition that existed before them. Scholars note that the Bala tradition is linked to Bhai Bala, who was a Jatt of the Sandhu clan, with the Hindali leaders also being from the Jatt caste. The Hindalis, alongside the Udasis and Bhatras, are blamed for corruption the Bhanno recension of the Ād Granth.

The Niranjanias found themselves allied to the ruling powers who were persecuting Sikhs at different periods of time. During times of anti-Sikh persecution, the Hindalis denied being Khalsa Sikhs at all or having any association with the Khalsa. Instead of appending Singh to their name, they instead appended the title Das. Bidhi Chand died in 1654 and was succeeded as leader of the sect by his son Devi Das, who was born to his Muslim wife. During the 18th century, the Hindali sect helped the Mughal and Afghan administrations persecute the orthodox Sikhs, such as Aqil Das (also known as Haribhagat), an 18th-century leader of the sect, giving intel which led to the deaths of Mehtab Singh and Taru Singh. Aqil Das had been a direct descendant of Hindal. Rattan Singh Bhangu's Panth Prakash called them chandalas ("butchers of the Sikhs") and nindaks ("back-biters") of the Sikhs during the period of the Vadda Ghalughara committed by the Durranis. Maharaja Ranjit Singh confiscated the lands of the Niranjania sect at Jandiala as punishment for their actions against the Sikhs during the previous century. By the late 19th century, the Hindalis still existed and observed their own marriage (having their own unique marriage custom) and death customs (not performing kiria karam or phul), rejecting Hindu customs, and they did not pay respect to Brahmins. Some heretical/heterdoxical verses attributed to Hindal can be found engraved on the walls of the Darbar Sahib Janamasthan at Jandiala Guru, Amritsar district, Punjab.

Over-time, they adopted Khalsa attributes, such as keeping kesh and wearing a turban. The 1881–91 census reports records the Hindalis as both Sehajdhari and Keshdharis. A survey of Hindali families in 2007 by Manpreet Kaur observed that many of the males maintain the mainstream Sikh practice of wearing a turban, having a beard, and maintaining uncut hair, with these families paying respect to both an idol of Baba Hindal and the Sikh scripture, the Guru Granth Sahib. In 1949, an Udasi named Sant Santokh Muni held an akhand path at the Nathoana Tobha and claimed it to be Tap Asthan. The site was marked by a gurdwara (Sikh temple), thakurdwara (Vaishnavist temple), and shivala (Shavist temple). Modern Hindalis pay respect to all three shrines and believe that dipping in the toba found there can grant them wishes, due to the blessings of Hindal. Whilst the Hindalis can be found across different caste backgrounds, most of them come from Jatt Sikh backgrounds and are from different regions of the Punjab. Some devotees also hail from the Sikh diaspora.

== See also ==
- Bhagat Dhanna
- Dhir Mal
- Prithi Chand
