= Sikh genocide =

Sikh genocide or Sikh massacre may refer to:

- Ghallughara (Sikhism), Punjabi for "massacre"
- Chhota Ghallughara, Punjabi for "Smaller Massacre", a 1746 massacre of Sikhs near Gurdaspur, India by the Mughal Empire
- Vadda Ghalughara, Punjabi for "Greater Massacre", a 1762 massacre of Sikhs at Barnala, India by the Durrani Empire following the Battle of Kup
- 1984 anti-Sikh riots, a series of organised pogroms against Sikhs in India following the assassination of prime minister Indira Gandhi by her Sikh bodyguards
