= Bhangu =

Bhangu is a surname of Indian Jat origin.

== People with the surname ==
- Gurpreet Bhangu, Indian actress
- Harman Bhangu, Canadian politician
- Mehtab Singh Bhangu, Sikh warrior and martyr
- Ratan Singh Bhangu, Sikh historian and warrior

== See also ==
- Bhanguri, village
