= Prachin Panth Prakash =

Sikh text of the 19th century by Rattan Singh Bhangu

Panth Prakash Prācīn Panth Prakāsh
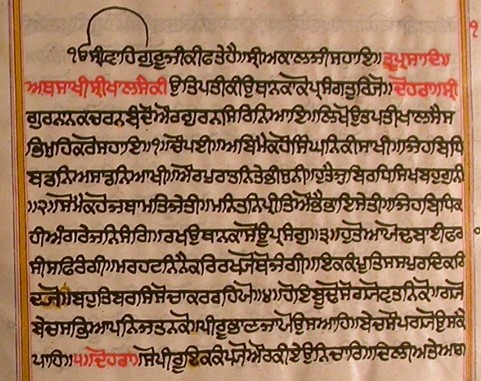
- Panth Prakash manuscript, Panjab University, Chandigarh, MS 797
- Author: Rattan Singh Bhangu
- Original title: Sri Gur Panth Prakash
- Language: Braj and Punjabi mix
- Genre: Sikhism
- Published: Early 1810's (G. S. Mann), 1841 (V. Singh)
- Publication place: Sikh Empire

Panth Prakash (Gurmukhi: ਪੰਥ ਪ੍ਰਕਾਸ਼), also called Prācīn Panth Prakāsh ("Old Panth Prakash", not to be confused with the "Naveen [new] Panth Prakash" by Giani Gian Singh) (Gurmukhi: ਪ੍ਰਾਚੀਨ ਪੰਥ ਪ੍ਰਕਾਸ਼ lit. "The Rise of the Honorable Guru Panth/Sikh Community"), is a historical chronicle about Sikh history in the 1700s by Rattan Singh Bhangu and was completed in the early 1810s. (Note: The original title of the work was 'Panth Prakash', it is not to be confused with a later work with a similar name by Giani Gian Singh, in-which it is differentiated from it by the addition of the word 'Prachin' meaning "old" before the title.) The text's opening foundation briefly covers the lives of the ten Sikh Gurus, then traces the accomplishments of the Sikh community from 1708 to the establishment of Sikh rule in Punjab. The text provides the most comprehensive compilation of stories related to the feats of Sikh warriors in the 18th century, the evolving Sikh martial formations, and the internal power dynamics between Sikh Misl groups.

== Description ==
The work was originally written by Bhangu for Captain Murray a British official stationed at Ludhiana. The British were curious about the Sikhs and wanted to know their history, however they sponsored a Muslim named Bute Shah of Malwa to write them a historical account of the Sikhs. Learning about this, Rattan Singh thought a Muslim writer would be biased against the Sikhs so he offered his service instead. Bhangu would orally explain Sikh history to Murray during the day and convert what he had said earlier into writing during the night, which would produce the work. Bhangu wrote the work in the Bunga of Sham Singh that had existed near the Golden Temple in Amritsar. The work was authored in Punjabi verse.

The original title of the work is Sri Gur Panth Prakash. The work can be divided into two parts:

1. Human guruship period: the period of the Sikh gurus, from the life of Guru Nanak until Guru Gobind Singh's death in 1708.
2. Post-human guruship period: covers the period from 1708 until the establishment of Sikh authority in the Punjab through the founding of the Sikh Empire by Ranjit Singh.

The work only goes into depth on Guru Nanak and Guru Gobind Singh, with some events related to Guru Hargobind and Guru Tegh Bahadur also being mentioned. Furthermore, the conquests of Banda Singh Bahadur and other prominent Sikhs of the era are noted. After Bhangu's account of Bhai Mani Singh's execution, the text loses its continuity and becomes more episodic in its recording of history. The episodes from Sikh history that Bhangu decided to included in this episodic section relate to the killing of Massa Ranghar, the martyrdoms of Bota Singh, Subeg Singh, Taru Singh, and Mehtab Singh, the Chhota Ghallughara, the Vadda Ghallughara, the third Sikh attack on Sirhind and death of Zain Khan Sirhindi, and Sikh attacks near Delhi.

B. S. Dhillon enumerated the total number of sakhis in the work text as being 163, J. S. Sital claimed the number was 170, and Vir Singh stated it was 199.According to G. S. Mann, the earliest manuscript recension of the text contains 100 sakhis. The work contains Indic poetic metres, such as the dohra and chaupai. The work criticizes Banda Singh Bahadur's conduct, such as him altering the salutation of the Khalsa, changing the colours from blue to red, enforcing vegetarianism, and not respecting Guru Gobind Singh's widowed wife. The Gangushahis under Kharak Singh's leadership are criticized for reintroducting the charan pahul admission ceremony. Bhangu also admonishes the cis-Sutlej states for accepting the suzerainty of the British East India Company, revealing a pro-Majha and anti-Malwa inclination in his perspective. Prominent Sikhs mentioned in the text are identified by their caste-background, yet Bhangu identifies all Sikhs as being equals through the amrit sanchar ceremony. The enemies of the Sikhs of the time are identified as being Mughals or Afghans, but also Hindu Rajputs working for them.

There are stylistic and substantive variations between the manuscript and print form of the text. Certain passages found in the precursory manuscript version have been edited-out in the print editions, such as references to Indic deities, removing references to Indic mythology, and replacing the word "Hindu" with "Sikh". According to Harinder Singh, these changes occurred due to the dominant theme of Sikhs and Hindus being totally different communities with no relation to one another, a viewpoint that arose during the Singh Sabha movement in the later part of the 19th century. Thus, the original work was edited to align with this understanding of Sikhism.

== History ==
=== Purpose ===
Rattan Singh Bhangu indicates that the original drive to write the text was to provide an accurate account of the Sikh Panth to the East India Company officials, as he deemed other accounts biased. Bhangu met with Captain William Murray, the head of the local British army of Colonel David Ochterlony, who then listened to the stories recounted by Bhangu. Even still, Dhavan argues the text was written for Punjabi-speaking Sikh audience, as opposed to a British one. William Murray was interested in historical chronology, thus Rattan Singh worked toward producing a work to satisfy this. Dhavan argues Bhangu asks "the Khalsa Sikh reader to participate in both witnessing and rememorializing the Sikh past … both as a form of spiritual practice and as a curb on the self-interest of the Khalsa warrior."

W. H. McLeod claims the text "vigorously arms the distinctive nature of the Khalsa identity and the claim that this was the identity which Guru Gobind Singh intended his followers to adopt". The text holds great esteem within the Nihang Sikh community, for they believe Rattan Singh himself to have been a Nihang.

=== Dating ===
Whilst the text had been dated to 1841 by Vir Singh, recent scholarship of Gurinder Singh Mann dates it to the early 1810s instead. Vir Singh believed that Rattan Singh spent around thirty years working on compiling the text, which is why he dated it to 1841. This is due to Vir Singh interpreting a cryptic passage within the text to be referring to its date of completion. However, this passage within the text does not appear in all of the available manuscript recensions of the text.

As per G. S. Mann, Rattan Singh likely finished the work between 1810 and 1813.This is due to how Rattan Singh makes no mention of the Sikh Empire's acquisition of the Kohinoor diamond in June 1813. Jvala Singh dates the work to circa 1809. Louis E. Fenech dates the work to ca.1810–1819.

=== Sources ===
Rattan Singh Bhangu, being the grandson of Mehtab Singh Bhangu, was privy to rare oral histories, often the author remarks how he had heard the story from an elder. His other grandfather was Sham Singh of the Karorsinghia Misl, which afforded him information to events regarding Banda Singh Bahadur. According to Sant Singh Sekhon, Bhangu used the Janamsakhis, Gurbilases, and oral tradition from his relatives to author the text. For Bhangu's account on Guru Tegh Bahadur's execution, he borrows from Guru Gobind Singh's Bachittar Natak.

Regarding the sources Rattan Singh Bhangu utilizes, G.S. Mann writes:

The text of Sri Gur Panth Prakash makes it clear that its author was a person of considerable learning with access to wide range of Sikh sources, which included the Guru Granth and historical documents ranging from the Puratan Janam Sakhi (1580s), Gurdas Bhalla’s Vars (pre-1630), Sainapati’s Sri Gur Sobha (pre-1710), and Sukha Singh’s Sri Gur Bilas (1797). He also refers to his access to non-Sikh documents, some of which were written in Sanskrit, Bhakha, and Persian.

The author Rattan Singh had access to a version of a work by Bute Shah, which documented Sikh history.

Rattan Singh likely had access to the following Janamsakhis to construct his account on the life of Guru Nanak within the work:

- Puratan Janamsakhi – even mentioning to the reader to consult with the Puratan Janamsakhi in the work itself
- Miharban Janamsakhi
- Bhai Bala Janamsakhi

As for his accounts of the later gurus within the text, he likely consulted the following sources:

- Vaaran of Bhai Gurdas
- Compositions attributed to Guru Gobind Singh found within the Dasam Granth, namely Jaap Sahib, Akaal Ustat, 32 Svayyie, Khial, Zafarnama, Apani Katha, and Chandi di Var
- Sri Gur Sobha of Sainapati
- Sri Gur Bilas of Sukha Singh (primary source used for Guru Gobind Singh's life)

He sources from secondhand accounts for his documentation on Banda Singh Bahadur's period.

=== Availability ===
==== Manuscripts ====
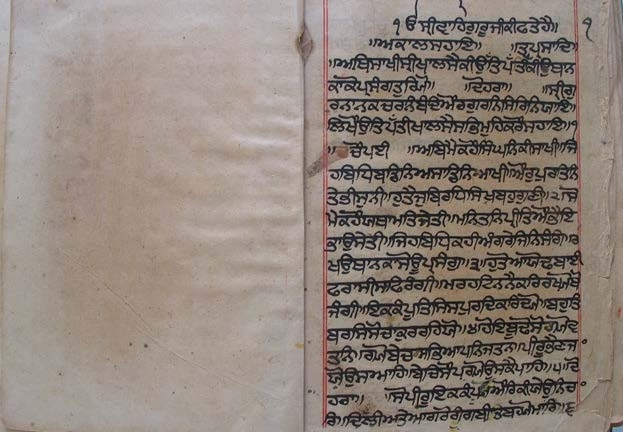
MS 1 of the Panth Prakash of Rattan Singh Bhangu, ca.1810–13. Possibly the original manuscript of the work.

Around ten manuscripts of the work are known to scholars, with only five of them still being accessible today.

Some of the presently available manuscripts of the work are as follows:

- MS 1 – unrecorded date of writing or scribe, 415 folios, kept in a private collection. According to G. S. Mann, this is the original manuscript of the work based upon internal evidence present within it, thus it may have been written by Bhangu himself.
- MS 2 – written circa February–March 1842, scribed by Dial Singh, 380 folios, kept in a private collection.
- MS 276 – unrecorded date of writing or scribe, containing 331 folios (last folio missing), kept in the collection of Guru Nanak Dev University, Amritsar.
- MS 797 – unrecorded date of writing, containing 247 folios, kept in the collection of Panjab University, Chandigarh
- Undated manuscript – opening and closing folios missing. A digitized copy is in the possession of Balwant Singh Dhillon of Guru Nanak Dev University.

Formerly known manuscripts which are no longer extant or available are as follows:

- Manuscript dated to 1842 – in the custody of Bhagwant Singh of Khanpur, Sangrur.
- Manuscript dated to 1858 – mentioned in the colophon, refer to Vir Singh's edition of 1939.
- MS 35 – manuscript dated to 1866, 314 folios, kept at Moti Bagh, Patiala (MS 35). This was probably the manuscript that Vir Singh referred to in his text.
- Undated manuscript – associated with the Rarewala family.
- Undated manuscript – was last available in the library of Punjab University, Lahore.

==== Printed editions ====
Vir Singh was the first to publish the text in 1914 at the Wazir-i-Hind Press, Amritsar after he found a manuscript of the work (Vir Singh is the one who is attributed as having added the Prachin ["old"] prefix to the work's title to distinguish it from Giani Gian Singh's later work), but this version has been criticized by scholars, such as Louis E. Fenech and Harinder Singh, for editing and chopping out sections. An annotated edition by Jit Singh Sital was published in 1984 by Shiromani Gurdwara Parbandhak Committee. Baba Santa Singh also published a Punjabi commentary in 2000. Another edition was created by Harinder Singh. A revised edition, based on manuscripts, was published by Balwant Singh Dhillon in 2004. Balwant Singh Dhillion's edition of the text has been criticized for not utilizing the earliest manuscript recensions and not documenting the changes to the text between these various manuscriptural versions.

== Translation ==
In 2006, the text was made available in English in two volumes through a translation by Kulwant Singh, sponsored and published by the Institute of Sikh Studies (Chandigarh). Another English translation, in two volumes, was prepared by Gurtej Singh and published by Singh Bros. in January 2015, with a second edition following in February 2021. Online translations of the work by Jaswinder Singh Sehmbi can be found at gurupurshotam.com. Other online translations of select passages of the text can be found at manglacharan.com.

== Legacy ==
According to Gurinder Singh Mann, the Sri Gur Panth Prakash initiated a genre of literature that specialized on the wider Khalsa community's mission and history in the post-guruship period. Communal exegesis of the text continues at gurdwaras and traditional Sikh educational institutions til the present-day. Many other works written after it adopted the same title. Giani Gian Singh wrote his own Panth Prakash in 1880, as he felt the poetry in Bhangu's work was lacking and that he had excluded the history of the Malwai Sikhs. According to Sant Singh Sekhon, the work is evidently biased toward the Majhai Sikhs at the expense of the Malwai Sikhs. However, Sant Singh Sekhon notes that Bhangu's account of the life of Banda Singh Bahadur and the chronology he presents remains accepted as reliable in Sikh historiography. Santa Singh requested that the text should be circulated in the form of audio-commentary, and called for the creation of such a commentary. According to Surjit Singh Hans, the work elevated Bhangu to become a "great historian" and that the work itself was a mark of Sikh historiography reaching a "ripe maturity".

== Editions ==
- 1914: Prachin Panth Prakash, ed. Bhai Vir Singh. Amritsar: Wazir Hind Press, 8th reprint 2008.
- 1974: Sri Gur Panth Prakash, edited by Jit Singh Sital. Amritsar: Shiromani Gurdwara Prabandhak Committee, 3rd reprint 2004.
- 2000: Prachin Panth Prakash, 2 vols., text and commentary by Baba Santa Singh. Damdama: Chalda Vahir.
- 2004: Sri Gur Panth Prakash, edited by Balwant Singh Dhillon. Amritsar: Singh Brothers.

== See also ==
- Rattan Singh Bhangu
- Suraj Parkash
- Twarikh Guru Khalsa
- Mahan Kosh
- Kavi Santokh Singh
