= Kursinama =

Genealogical pedigree found in the Indian subcontinent

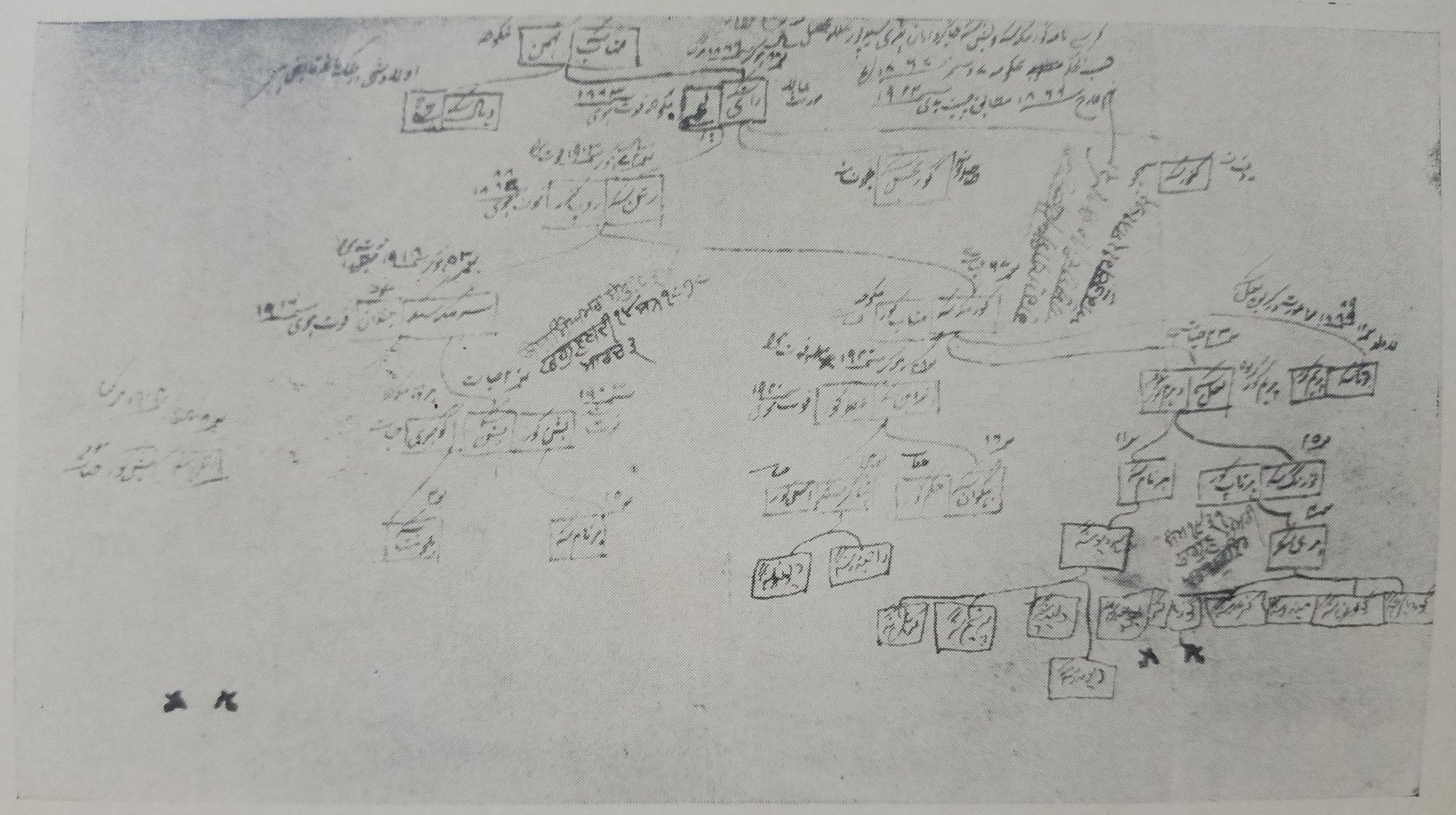
Bansavalinama of Ratan Singh Bhangu, this family-tree of Bhangu was created by him, accompanying a Panth Prakash manuscript in Perso-Arabic script

A Kursinama, also known as a Bansavalinama, is a type of genealogical-pedigree or family-tree found in the Indian subcontinent. (Note: Also spelt as 'Kursee Nama', 'Kurseenama', or 'Kursee-e-nama'.) Kursinamas can be described as an extended-genealogy of a family. The term can also be used to describe the religious lineage of a particular sect. Shajra documents often contain kursinamas to track the patrilineal descent of land-owners of a particular area. Kursinamas are also compiled by Adivasi groups, such as the Munda.
