= Sham Singh of Narli =

Sikh commander of the 18th century

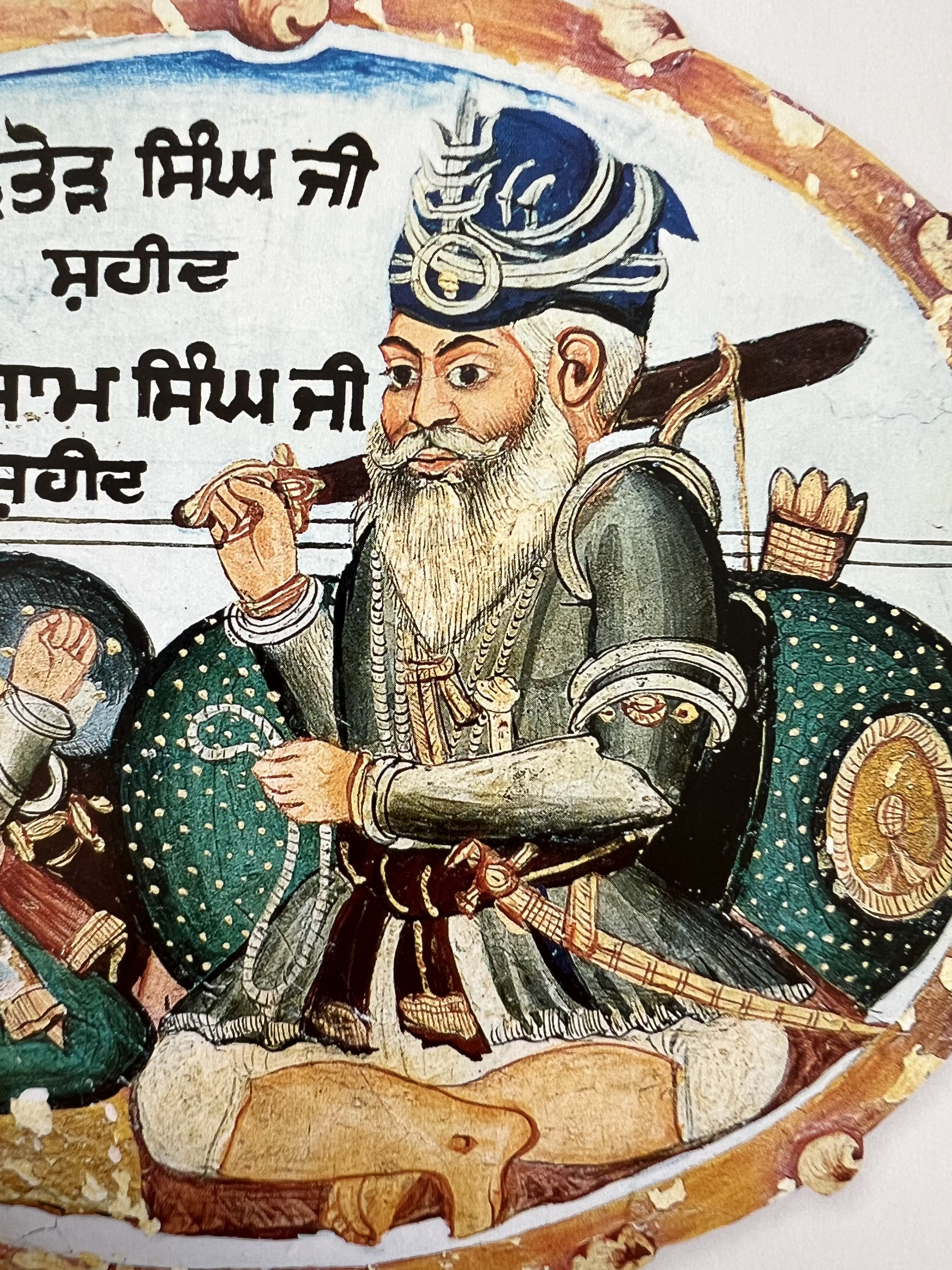
Painting of Sham Singh of Narli, detail of a fresco from Gurdwara Baba Atal Rai, Amritsar, circa late-19th century

Sham Singh of Narli (fl. 18th century) was a Sikh warrior, also known by the titles Sardaran Sirdar and Panth Thanedar. He was a Jat of Narli village (also spelt Narla) and associated with the early origins of Karorsinghia Misl of the Sikh Confederacy.

== Early life ==
He was born into either a Sandhu or Dhillon family and left his native village due to feeling upset over the treatment of his parents, He joined the dera of Nawab Kapur Singh. He became baptized as a Khalsa Sikh under Kapur Singh. Another mentor of Sham Singh was Darbara Singh.

== Career ==
He may have played a role in the decision to split the Sikh military forces into two factions from 1720 to 1783. According to Hari Ram Gupta, he became a leader of a jatha under the Buddha Dal in 1734. As per one account, he was killed during the invasion of Nader Shah in 1739, but as per Shamsher Singh Majhail, this was a misunderstanding, because his grandson Rattan Singh Bhangu claims Sham Singh fought in the Vadda Ghalughara in 1762. He died in early 1783 according to the historian Karam Singh in his work Amar Khalsa. Sham Singh was succeeded as leader of his band by Karam Singh, an Uppal Khatri of Paijgarh village. The jatha band Sham Singh started would later formulated an independent misl. Sham Singh's adopted son was Sukha Singh, who became one of the two assassins of Massa Ranghar. His grandson was Rattan Singh Bhangu.
