= Vadda Ghallughara =

1762 massacre of Sikhs by the Durranis

- Part of Afghan-Sikh Wars and Indian campaign of Ahmad Shah Durrani
- Native name: ਵੱਡਾ ਘੱਲੂਘਾਰਾ ("Greater Massacre")
- Location: 45–50 kilometre stretch of a route from Kup-Rahira to Barnala, passing through the villages of Kup, Rahira, Kutba, Bahmania, Gehal and Hathur
- Date: 5–6 February 1762
- Deaths: 10,000 to 50,000 Sikh men, women, and children
- Victim: Sikh non-combatants
- Perpetrators: Afghan Durrani Empire, Malerkotla State
- Assailants: Ahmad Shah Abdali, Zain Khan, Bikhan Khan, Kasim Khan, Tahmas Khan Miskin, Wazir Shah Wali Khan, Dewan Lachhmi Narayan
- Defenders: Eleven Misldars, including Jassa Singh Ahluwalia and Charat Singh Sukerchakia

Vadda Ghallughara (Punjabi: ਵੱਡਾ ਘੱਲੂਘਾਰਾ Punjabi pronunciation: [ʋəɖɖäː kəl˨luːkäː˨ɾäː]; alternatively spelt as Wadda Ghallughara) was a massacre of Sikhs by the Afghan forces of the Durrani Empire during the years of Afghan influence in the Punjab region of the Indian subcontinent owing to the repeated incursions of Ahmad Shah Durrani in February 1762. It is distinguished from the Chhota Ghalughara (the Smaller Massacre). Mostly non-combatants were killed in the event, and an estimated that 5,000 to 50,000 Sikhs were killed on 5–6 February 1762. The massacre occurred in what is present-day Ludhiana district. The killings began in Kup-Rohira and ended at Gehal, as the invader's forces passed through village Kutba. Much of the killings occurred in a dense-jungle environment.

The Vadda Ghalūghārā was a dramatic and bloody massacre during the campaign of Afghanistan's (Durrani Empire) provincial government based at Lahore to wipe out the Sikhs, an offensive that had begun with the Mughals and lasted several decades. The Sikhs extracting tribute from the Sirhind region due to the ineffectiveness of Zain Khan Sirhindi, attacking the diwan Lakshami Narain and stealing the funds from the revenue-collection, and the killing of Khwaja Obed at Lahore were all immediate contributing factors that motivated Ahmad Shah Abdali to embark on a punitive expedition against the Sikhs.

== Background ==
=== Persecution of the Sikhs (1746–1762) ===
Through much of the early eighteenth century, the Khalsa were outlawed by the government and survived in the safety of remote forests, deserts, and swamplands of the Punjab region and neighbouring Kashmir and Rajasthan. In the 18 years following the Chhota Ghalughara, Punjab was roiled with five invasions and had several years of rebellions and civil war. Under these unsettled circumstances, it was difficult for any authority to carry on a campaign of oppression against the Sikhs; instead the Sikhs were often sought and valued as useful allies in the various struggles for power.

In these times of relative calm, however, Shah Nawaz, the governor at Lahore in 1747 and his Afghan allies resumed their brutal campaigns against the Sikhs. This period was characterised by the desecration of Sikh places of worship and the organised capture, torture and merciless execution of tens of thousands of Sikh men, women and children.

=== The governorship of Mir Mannu ===
Mir Mannu (Mu'in ul-Mulk) became governor of Lahore and the surrounding provinces in 1748 and, continued to hold that position for the next five years until 1753 through his exploits in battle against the Afghan army. His first act as governor was to take control of Ram Rauni, the Sikh fort at Amritsar, where 500 Sikhs had taken shelter. To take control of the fort and defeat the Sikhs, Mir sent word to Adina Beg, the commander of the army of Jalandhar. Both the armies of Lahore and Jalandhar eventually laid siege to the fort, and despite much resistance from the Sikhs, it eventually fell to them. Mir Mannu then stationed detachments of troops in all parts of Punjab with any Sikh inhabitants with orders to capture them and shave their heads and beards. His oppression was such that large numbers of Sikhs moved to relatively inaccessible mountains and forests. The governor ordered the apprehending of Sikhs who were sent in irons to Lahore. Hundreds were thus taken to Lahore and executed in the horse market before crowds of onlookers. According to the historian Nur Ahmed Chishti, Mir Mannu ordered the execution of more than 1,100 Sikhs at the horse market of Shahidganj during Eid.

Partly through the influence of his Hindu minister, Kaura Mall, who was sympathetic to the Sikhs, and partly because of the threat of another Afghan invasion, Mir Mannu made peace with the Sikhs the next year. They were granted a piece of land near Patti. This truce did not last long as in the next Afghan invasion the artillery of Lahore attacked the Sikhs of Dal Khalsa under Sukha Singh. The Sikh army left promptly after this attack, which led to the eventual defeat and fall of Lahore to Durrani. Kaura Mall was also eventually murdered by Adina Beg at the hands of a Pathan in the battle against the Afghans in 1752. Lahore was soon surrendered to the invader Ahmad Shah Durrani. The land given to the Sikhs was also seized back from them.

In his new role as governor for the Afghans, Mir Mannu was able to resume his persecution of the Sikhs. Moreover, he had arranged for new artillery to be forged and a unit of 900 men assigned especially to the hunting down of the "infidels". In the words of an eyewitness: "Muin appointed most of the gunmen to the task of chastising the Sikhs. They ran after these wretches up to 67 kilometers (42 mi) a day and slew them wherever they stood up to oppose them. Anybody who brought a Sikh head received a reward of ten rupees per head."

According to that same account: "The Sikhs who were captured alive were sent to hell by being beaten with wooden mallets. At times, Adina Beg Khan sent 40 to 50 Sikh captives from the Doab. They were as a rule killed with the strokes of wooden hammers."

Illustration of Sikh women and children toiling away grinding flour at Mir Mannu's death camp, by Gian Singh Naqqash, ca.1930. The event depicted likely occurred between 1748-1753.

Mir Mannu explicitly ordered his troops to seize and torture the Sikh women and children. The women were seized from their homes and forced to grind grain in prison with the detainees forced to grind about 1.25 maunds of grain (46 kilograms of grain) to grind in a day. According to a Sikh account, "Many of the women were given merciless lashing, working all day exhausted from thirst and hunger, they plied their stone-mills and while they plied their stone-mills they sang their Guru's hymns. The Hindu or the Muslim, or in fact anyone who saw them and listened to their songs was utterly astonished. As their children, hungry and thirsty, wailed and writhed on the ground for a morsel, the helpless prisoners in the hands of the prisoners could do little except solace them with their affection until wearied from crying the hungry children would go to sleep."

Mir Mannu's cruel reign, however, did not stop the spread of Sikhism. According to a popular saying of that time "Mannu is our sickle, We the fodder for him to mow. The more he cuts, the more we grow." The continued harassment by Mir Mannu only helped strengthen the numbers and faith of the Sikhs.

=== Baba Deep Singh ===
In 1756 Ahmad Shah Durrani started his fourth raid on India for plunder. He managed to successfully raid the city of Delhi and captured gold, jewellery and thousands of Hindu women as slaves. But on his way back his baggage train was repetitively ambushed and attacked by the Sikh forces, who liberated the slaves and returned the plunder. Durrani managed to escape and vowed to take revenge against the Sikhs. Because Durrani could not lay his hands on the elusive bands of Sikhs, he determined to attack their holy city Amritsar, the Harimandir Sahib was blown up, and the surrounding pool filled with the entrails of slaughtered cows.

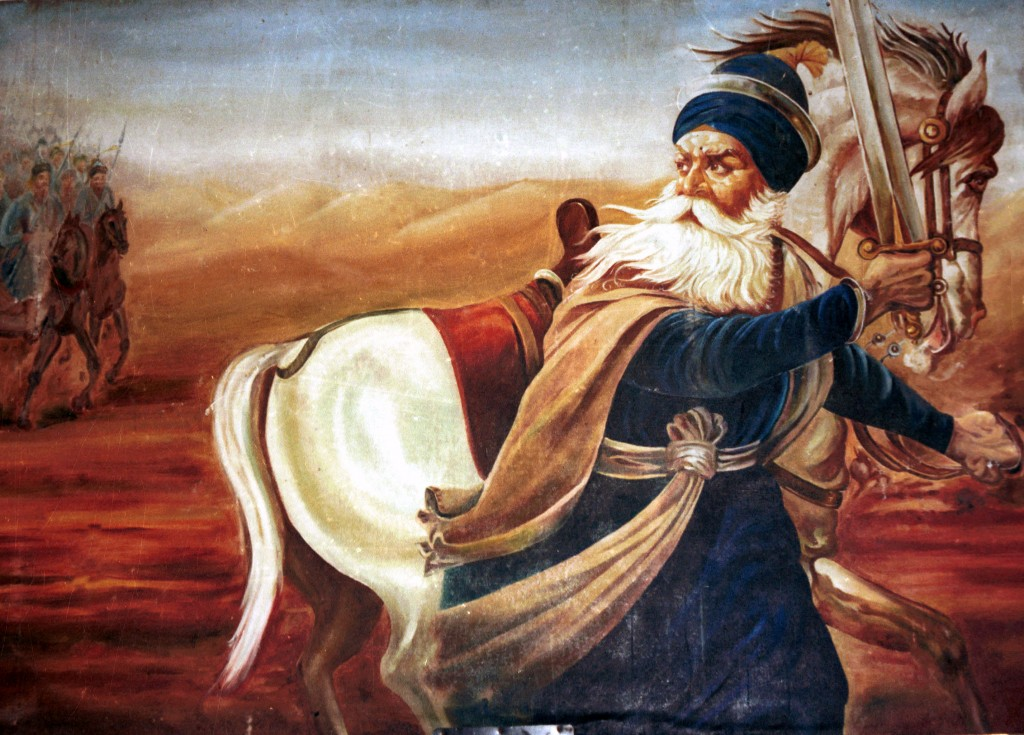
Baba Deep Singh a prominent Sikh Sant

Hearing of this event Baba Deep Singh, an elderly scholar of the Sikhs living at Damdama Sahib, 160 kilometres (99 mi) south of Amritsar, was stirred to action. As the leader of one of the Sikh divisions entrusted with the care of the temple, he felt responsible for the damage that had been done to it and announced his intention of rebuilding the Harmandir Sahib. He set out his forces Sikhs toward the Amritsar and along the way, many other Sikhs joined, eventually numbering about 5,000 when they reached the outskirts of Amritsar. In the nearby town of Tarn Taran Sahib they prepared themselves for martyrdom by sprinkling saffron on each other's turbans.

When word reached Lahore that a large body of Sikhs had arrived near Amritsar a Janam Khan mobilised an army of 20,000 soldiers. Two large forces were sent. Approaching Amritsar, Baba Deep Singh and his companions encountered them and a fierce battle ensued. The Sikh forces battled valiantly but the superior numbers of the enemies and continuous reinforcements led to their eventual defeat.

Wielding his khanda (double-edged sword), the 75-year-old Sikh sustained many wounds but managed to kill the general Janam Khan beheading him in the process. Deep Singh was also mortally wounded with a blow to the neck, but not completely decapitated. After receiving this blow, a Sikh reminded Baba Deep Singh, "You had resolved to reach the periphery of the pool." On hearing the talk of the Sikh, he held his head with his left hand and removing the enemies from his way with the strokes of his 15 kg (33 lb) khanda "with his right hand, reached the periphery of Harmandir Sahib where he breathed his last. The Singhs celebrated the Bandi Chhor Divas of 1757 in Harmandir Sahib".

== The massacre of 1762 ==
=== Lead-up ===
The Sikhs had suffered a large massacre in 1746, with the Mughals officially restarting their anti-Sikh campaign with the appointment of Shah Nawaz as subahdar in 1747. Between 1748–53, Mir Mannu had conducted his own persecution of the Sikhs and captured 500 Sikhs at Ram Rauni through the assistance of Adina Beg. These Sikhs were tortured and executed at a place now known as Shahidganj in Lahore on the occasion of Eid.

The Afghan ruler, Ahmad Shah Abdali, who came to power in 1747, had invaded the Indian subcontinent at-least nine times between the years 1747–69, with him targeting Sikhs in five of his invasions when his army passed through the Punjab. On 14 January 1761, in the aftermath of the Third Battle of Panipat, the Afghans were returning to their native country with the spoils of war, including 2,200 imprisoned unwed Hindu Marathi girls and women. Whilst the Afghans were crossing the Sutlej River, suddenly Sikh forces fell upon them and rescued the captured Marathi women, saving them from their captors, and returning them to their parents and families. The act of valour made Abdali consider the Sikhs as a greater threat than he had previously and he began thinking that he needed to wipe out the Sikhs from Punjab in-order to firmly establish Afghani control over the territory.

From June to September 1761, the Sikhs had routed the forces of the faujdar of Jalandhar. The Sikhs proceeded to loot Sirhind and Malerkotla. After routing Afghan forces, they also briefly captured and occupied the city of Lahore.

The annual Diwali convening of the Sarbat Khalsa at Amritsar on 27 October 1761 had passed a gurmatta that supporters of the Durranis must be eliminated, beginning with Aqil Das (based in Jandiala), to prepare to establish independence of the region from invading and occupying Afghan forces. After coming to know about this judgement made against him, Aqil Das sought out the help of Abdali. Another decision passed in the gurmatta was that Sikhs should take Lahore and occupy it.

Sikhs shortly after would attack Lahore. During this attack the local ruler of Lahore, Ubaid Khan, locked himself in the fort of the city to avoid the Sikhs. This allowed the Sikh forces to take control of the outer areas of the city. Nawab Kapur Singh then placed Jassa Singh Ahluwalia on the throne at Lahore, proclaiming him as the emperor. Thereafter, Sikhs began to refer to him as a king. Sikhs also gained control of the local Lahori mint and issued their own coinage. The Sikhs could not establish an enduring occupation of the city so they decided to leave and attack Jandiala next.

In January 1762, Sikh fighters then converged onto Jandiala, 18 kilometres (11 mi) east of Amritsar. The Sikh forces were laying siege against the stronghold of the heretical Hindali sect led by Aqil Das. The place was the home of Aqil Das, the head of the heretical Nirinjania (Hindali) sect, an ally of the Afghans, and an inveterate enemy of the Sikhs. He was a known informant for the Islamic governments working against the Sikhs. Due to his past actions, many Sikhs had been killed.

Aqil sent messengers to Durrani pleading for his help against the Sikhs. The envoys of Aqil met with Abdali at Rohtas when the latter was advancing to begin his sixth invasion, with the goal of annihilating the Sikhs. After coming to learn of the trouble his ally was in, Abdali's forces hurried to Lahore and the next day reached Jandiala to relieve the siege, but by the time they arrived the siege had been lifted and the Sikh besiegers were already gone.

The Sikh fighters had retreated with the view of taking their families to safety in the Malwa desert before returning to confront the invader. Another reason for the Sikh retreat is they left to avenge the recent death of Dyal Singh Brar at the hands of Zain Khan of Sirhind. The Sikhs began to encamp at the villages of Raipur and Gujjarawal. At this time, the Sikhs were encamped at Kup, Rahira, Dehlon, and Gurm villages, with all of them just a short distance from Malerkotla. This region was known as the juh (uncultivated, waste or open land used as a pasture). Dehlon was a Sikh-populated village at that time and the surrounding area consisted of a landscape of sand dunes and heavy forrestation. There was a large and dense jungle located near Gurm in-which the Sikhs took shelter within.

Bikhan Khan, ruler of Malerkotla State, discovered that Sikh forces and their families were taking shelter in villages surrounding his city, to which he alerted Abdali about and reached out to Zain Khan for a joint-operation against the Sikhs. Jahan Khan, commander of Sirhind, was also present at Malerkotla at this time. When the Afghan leader came to know of the whereabouts of the Sikhs he sent word ahead to his allies, Zain Khan (faujdar of Sirhind) and Bikhan Khan (chief or nawab of Malerkotla) to stop their advance. Abdali instructed Zain Khan to attack the Sikhs with his forces from the front whilst Abdali would attack them from the rear. The attacks of Zain and Bikhan against the Sikhs were ineffective but the main force of Abdali was yet to arrive on the scene. Abdali further gave orders to Zain Khan that his troops, who were local Indians, should hang green leaves from their turbans to distinguish themselves from the Sikhs to prevent friendly-fire.

Durrani departed on 3 February from Lahore to reach the Malwa region, he set about on a rapid march, covering the distance of 240 kilometres (150 mi) and including two river crossings in less than 48 hours. On 4 February, he sent word to Zain Khan that he would arrive tomorrow with his forces and that their two forces should launch a joint attack on the Sikhs in the early morning the following day. At that time, an estimated 150,000 Sikhs had set up bivouac in the rohi (uncultivated land) of the Sirhind region. They consisted of 50,000–60,000 able-bodied fighting men (both infantry and cavalry), with the larger remainder being their accompanying families. At Malerkotla, Zain Khan camped out with a force of 10,000–15,000 men, of both infantry and mounted-types, under his command.

Eventually Abdali was only within 15–20 kilometres from the main Sikh body. When his army embarked away from the dock on the Sutlej, they were immediately attacked by Sikhs and a battle ensued. Zain Khan also agitated to attack the SIkhs on early 5 February. The Sikhs came to learn of this design and therefore started marching towards the Sutlej. Zain Khan dispatched a scouting party to follow the Sikhs, consisting of Kasim Khan and Tahmas Khan Miskin, the latter giving this account in his writing:

"I was also in the contingent of Kasim Khan. When we went in front of the Sikhs they ran away. We followed them for half a koh (2 kms). All of a sudden the Sikhs who were running stopped quickly and returned towards us and attacked us. Kasim Khan could not counter them and ran away, although I asked him not to run away. He did not accept my suggestion. Taking his army along with him he ran away towards Malerkotla and encamped there. I (Miskeen) alone went towards the village Kup. In the meantime those Sikhs had disappeared".

— Tahmas Khan Miskin, Tahmasnama

The forces of Miskin were ineffective in battle against the Sikhs in the early hours of 5 February and Kasim Khan had abandoned the mission for now and camped at Malerkotla. Abdali caught up with the encamped Sikhs at Kup-Rahira, approximately twelve kilometres north of Malerkotla.

=== Massacre ===
In the twilight of 5 February 1762, Durrani and his allies surprised the Sikhs who numbered about 30,000 at Kup village alone, with most of them noncombatants being women, children, and elderly men. Also present in the group of Sikhs were 11 Misldars (leader of a Misl) of the Sikh Confederacy, including Jassa Singh Ahluwalia of the Ahluwalia Misl and Charat Singh of the Sukerchakia Misl. The officials of the Sikh chiefdoms of the Malwa region were also present. Abdali gave the order to his forces to slaughter anyone found wearing "Indian clothing". Abdali split his army into two factions: one commanded by him and the other commanded by Shah Wali Khan. The army of Shah Wali Khan was ordered to attack the encamped Sikh families. The first person to attack the Sikhs was Qasim Khan. At Kup village alone, several thousand Sikhs were killed, with most of the fatalities being women and children. Abdali then ordered two other generals of his forces, Jahan Khan and Buland Khan, to attack the Sikhs. The army of Shah Wali Khan slew a lot of Sikh non-combatants, with many women and children being taken as prisoners.

At-first, a pitched battle ensued in the first phase of hostilities between the Sikh army and Abdali's army near the banks of the Sutlej, whilst the vāhir convoy, consisting of Sikh non-combatants, had distanced themselves 10–12 kilometres from the battlefield and were passing through the villages of Kup and Rahira (these two localities are distanced apart from each-other by around 4 km and were both Muslim-dominated demographically in this period of time). Suddenly whilst the convoy were passing through this area, the two armies of Zain Khan Sirhindi and Bhikhan Khan of Malerkotla fell upon them unexpectedly. Many Sikh children and women were slaughtered in the ensuing drama. The Dal Khalsa forces, whom were engaging Abdali's army in a pitched battle, came to learn of the carnage enacted upon their kin and decided to send a jatha under the command of Sham Singh Karorsinghia, Karo Singh, Karam Singh, Nahar Singh, and some other sardars to assist the vāhir. The jatha was able to repel the armies of Zain Khan Sirhindi and Bikhan Khan temporarily and the convoy continued its journey to Barnala. They also managed to free the captured Sikh women and children abducted by the army of Shah Wali Khan. Shah Wali Khan decided to give-up on capturing the Sikh women and children and the faction of the army he commanded re-joined the main Afghan army. The main Dal Khalsa forced withdrew from the pitched battle near the Sutlej as they now knew their women, children, and elderly were vulnerable to further attacks so they reunited with the vāhir convoy in the region of Kup-Rahira. Whilst withdrawing from the battlefield near the Sutlej to reunite with the vahir convoy, the Sikh army continued attacking the main force of Abdali even when in retreat, whilst Zain Khan and Bikhan Khan attempted to attack the vahir convoy from the frontward direction. Sukhdial Singh described the actions of the Sikh forces as follows: "... the Dal Khalsa had drifted away Abdali's forces as if they were a dry stalk of grass". Charat Singh managed to wound Buland Khan in the ensuing fight. After doing so, Jahan Khan managed to wound Charat Singh but then Jassa Singh Ahluwalia managed to strike a wound on Jahan Khan.

Bhangu recounts that many enemy cavalrymen were killed but their mounts remained living, so these horses were captured and used by the Sikhs in their defence. Wazir Shah Wali Khan wielded an army of 4,000 cavalry warriors whilst Zain Khan Sirhindi had a force of 4,000 mounted archers. Zain Khan was also accompanied by Dewan Lachhmi Narayan. Some Sikhs surrendered during the hostilities in the Kup-Rahira region and were subsequently arrested.

The reunited vahir convoy and their Dal Khalsa protectors held their ground more-or-less for an hour and a half from the harassing forces of their nemeses. However, Abdali then sent two armed contingents of his army to attack the convoy and the Sikhs began to slip up in their defence and exposure points opened. Sukhdial Singh describes that when the Sikh armies engaged their enemy one-on-one, they discovered the advancing vahir had left them behind, which made the convoy vulnerable, so they had to catch-up with the convoy and were unable to stay stationary. Eventually, after one hour of heavy combat, the Sikhs were able to repel even the two armed contingents sent by Abdali so the Afghan king decided to engage the convoy directly with his own reserve army and be directly present in the carnage. Abdali's army consisted of four contingents, which included 12,000 armed men in total. This attack by Abdali managed to separate the main defending body of Sikh warriors from the vahir convoy, which left it exposed.

The Sikhs were outnumbered four-to-one, facing three hostile armies, and the Afghans brought heavy artillery with them, which the Sikhs completely lacked. It was decided by the Sikhs that they should fight even if they would all perish as a result. The tactic devised was that the Sikh fighters would form a cordon around the slow-moving baggage train (vāhir) consisting of women, children and old men. The vāhir began in the villages of Dehlon and Gurm and would travel to Barnala. The Sikh leaders decided to traverse in the direction of Barnala because Barnala was Sikh-dominated in population and they would assist in repelling the Afghans. Three Sikhs who were Malwa chieftains, them namely being Bhai Sangu Singh Vakil of Bhai Ke Daraj, Bhai Sekhu Singh of Humblke Waas Wala (official of Ala Singh) and Bhai Buddha Singh, were chosen to lead the vāhir from the front through the use of large cloths, called a chaadra, at the top of their spears. This was to provide a sense of direction and order to the convoy of Sikh families behind them.

19th century depictions of carriages used by Sikhs

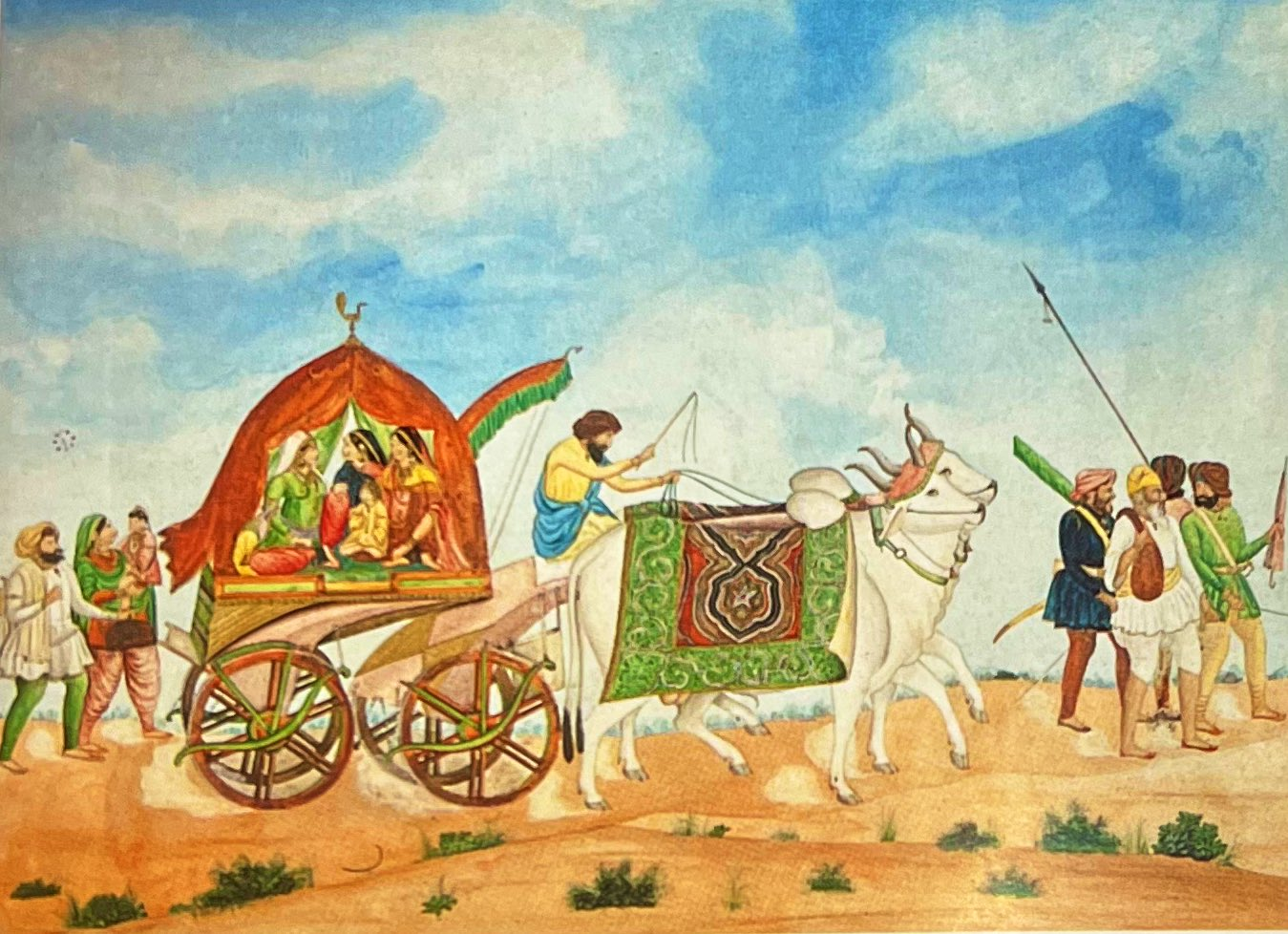

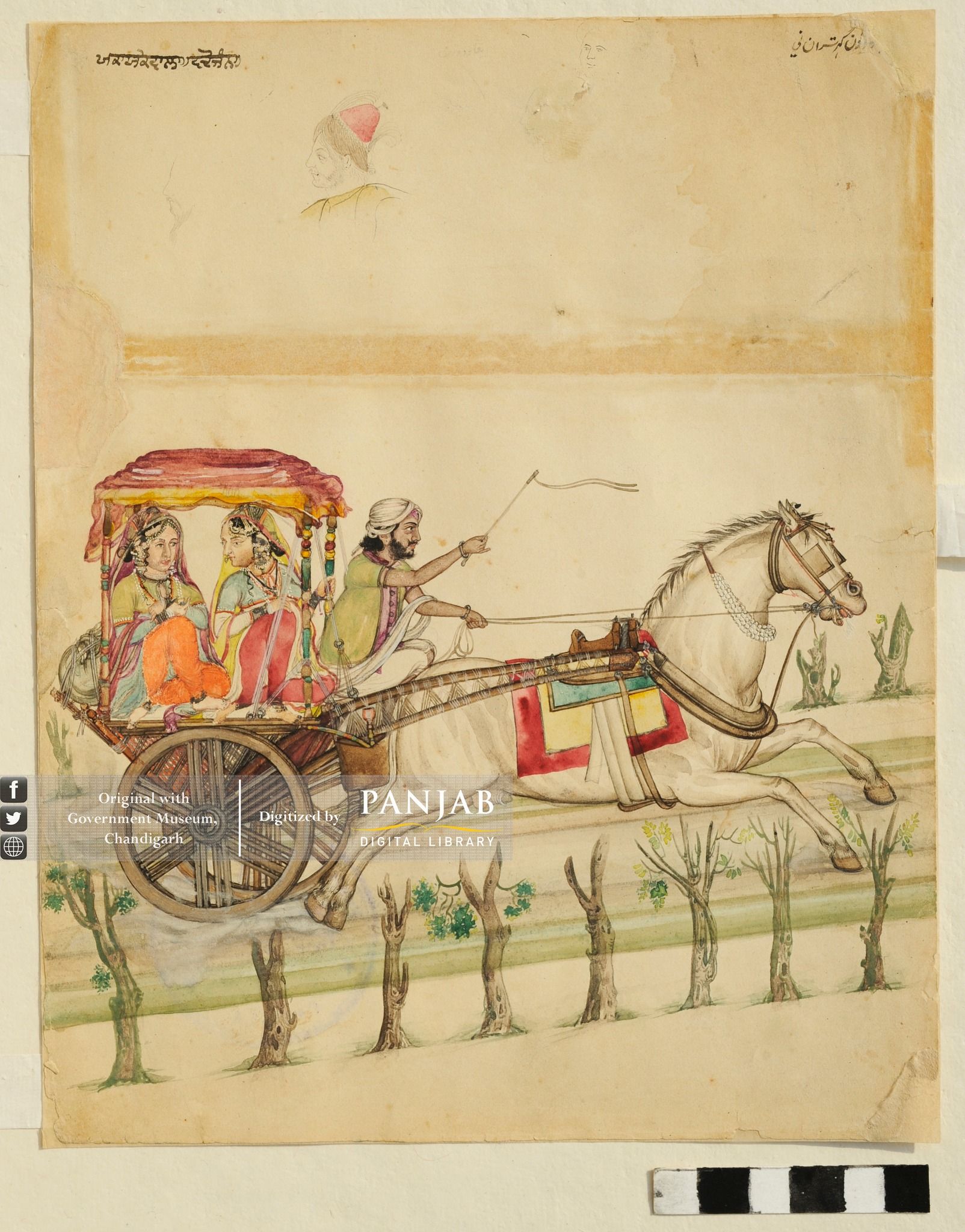

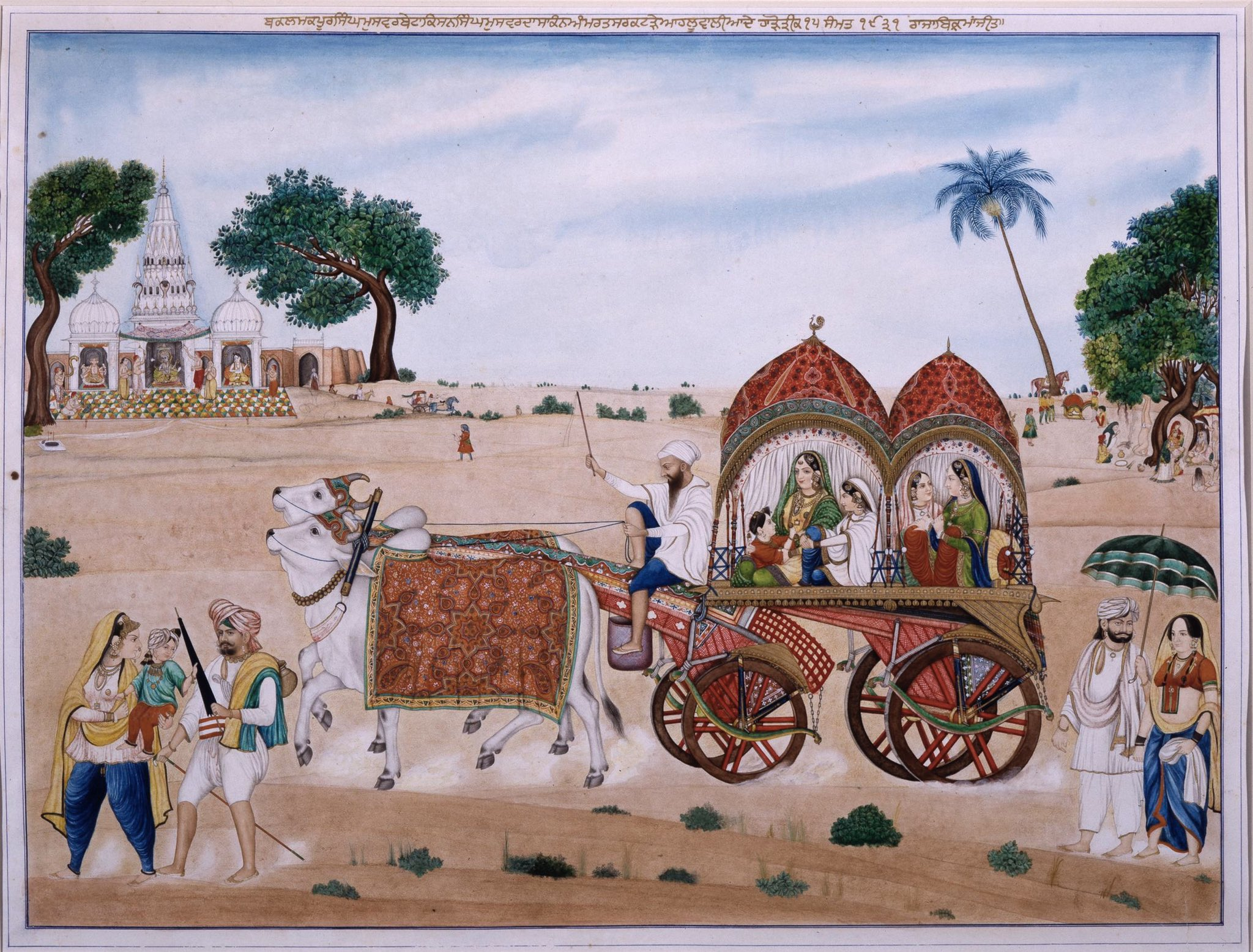

The Sikh forces could not make use of their usual guerilla hit-and-run tactics due to the presence of their non-combatants amongst them, which made them vulnerable. A stationary battle would be suicidal for the Sikhs as they were vastly outnumbered and out-equipped. Charat Singh suggested that the Sikhs form a square formation, with forces of four misls facing the front directly in line with the enemy whilst the forces of two misls would protect the flanks of the convoy and the remainder acting as reserve. Jassa Singh Ahluwalia turned down Charat's suggestion and thought it was better if all the misls united as a single, mobile fighting body against the enemy, with the Sikh warriors cordoned around the vāhir convoy to protect it from enemy attack, and head in the direction of Barnala, which was forty kilometres southwest of their current location. They expected their ally Ala Singh and the guides of his Phulkian Misl to come to their rescue once they arrived near their intended destination. If that failed, they expected to lose their enemy in the parched, waterless, arid areas of Bathinda.

As per Tahmas Khan Miskin's account, the Dal Khalsa forces decided to enact the same methods used in the earlier Chotta Ghalughara, where 2½ gash steps were used to tackle the army. The tactic is as follows: first gash attacks the opposing force quickly when the hostile forces are under full control, second gash consists of a quick withdrawal, and the half gash was essentially to die in battle rather than being captured by your opponent.

Sukhdial Singh surreally describes the sort of landscape the mobile slaughter and battle occurred in: sandy mounds, little or no bodies of water to re-hydrate oneself, Sikh stragglers who fell behind were abandoned. If a Sikh fell down in battle, he would be trampled by the hoofs of horses. When the Sikh warriors witnessed their women, children, and elders being mercilessly slaughtered when the convoy's defence was breached, it reinvigorated their fighting spirit to protect the survivors from the same fate. Abdali is said to have been surprised by how gravely and mortally injured Sikhs, who were drenched in blood, would continue to fight-on.

As per Bhangu, Abdali then reprimanded Zain Khan Sirhindi for his failure at breaching the convoy from the front:

"... as yet you have not done what you had promised. You have not been able to besiege the Singhs from the front. You have 20,000 horse riders. Have the Singhs decreased this number by killing them? You also have the army of Malle Riya pathans of Lachchmi Narayan. Even then you have not been able to encircle these kafirs [non-believers in God or Islam]. If you can hold them out only for four gharian (two hours) I will finish them all. Without surrounding them, it is not possible to kill them'.

— Rattan Singh Bhangu quoting Abdali, Panth Prakash

Zain Khan then responded: "it is not possible to besiege them from the front. To look at they seem very few but I don't know why during the fight they seem too many". Zain Khan then advised Abdali to also attack the vahir convoy from the frontward direction, which the latter started doing. Abdali would attack the Sikh convoy from the front whilst the vahir traversed a distance of six kilometres. Charat Singh Sukerchakia was managing the defence of the convoy from the frontward direction and came face-to-face with the army of Abdali. At some point, Jassa Singh Ahluwalia's own horse was slain by the enemy so he had to take the horse of another fellow Sikh. This led to Sikh warriors going backward to protect the life of Jassa Singh Ahluwalia, who was in a vulnerable position.

Abdali wanted to halt the Sikh mobility and fight them in a pitched battle but the Sikhs did not relent their moving convoy towards Barnala, fighting village-to-village along the way.

Early 19th century Sikh writer, Rattan Singh Bhangu, records eyewitness testimonies on the events of that day, sourced from his father and uncle who partook in the defence against the Afghans:

"... fighting while moving and moving while fighting ... they kept the vahir marching, covering it as a hen covers its chickens under its wings."

— Rattan Singh Bhangu, Prachin Panth Prakash

More than once, the troops of the invader broke the cordon and mercilessly butchered the women, children and elderly inside, but each time the Sikh warriors regrouped and managed to push back the attackers.

At some point during the trek, a major breakthrough of the cordon was achieved by the Afghan forces, where they proceeded to slaughter thousands upon thousands of Sikhs.

The slaughter of Sikhs by the Afghans started in the twilight hours and continued until the afternoon.

=== Hostility of local Muslim villagers ===
After the incident involving the death of Jassa Singh Ahluwalia's horse, the Sikhs reached the villages of Kutba and Bahmania (both villages are approximately 1½ km apart from each-other), whose local Hindu and Sikh residents had long vacated the localities and only Muslim residents were remaining. The Muslim residents of these places fiercely attacked the Sikhs who sought help and shelter from them to escape their slaughter, with the Muslim residents killing many of these pleading Sikhs in the process.

Local residents from many villages along the route, such as Qutab-Bahmani and Gahal, attacked the Sikhs who attempted to seek shelter with them as the locals fear retaliation by the Afghans and becoming a target themselves. All the local residents of the villages (Kup, Rahira, Kutba, Bahmania, and Hathur) the Sikhs sought help and shelter from were populated by Muslims at that time, aside from Gehal village.

Some Sikh women, children, and elders tried to escape their certain doom by hiding out in the minarets of cow dung, jawar (sorghum), millet, and corn located outside these villages. The hostile forces and Muslim locals set these minarets on fire whilst the Sikhs were inside them to burn them alive.

In retaliation for the local residents slaughtering pleading Sikhs, some Sikh warriors killed some residents of Kutba and Bahmania villages. After Charat Singh Sukerchakia learnt that the local villagers of Kutba were ruthlessly slaughtering fleeing Sikhs in this manner, he departed with a jatha of warriors who proceeded to kill the local residents. He razed to the ground the houses of the local people who murdered Sikhs and destroyed all of their agricultural production. This led the local Muslims to plead to the Afghan army for protection. However, the Afghans could do little to help as they were already focused on attacking the main Sikh convoy.

=== Cessation of hostilities ===
By early afternoon, the fighting cavalcade reached a large pond, known in the local vernacular as a dhab, at Hathur (as per Gian Singh) or Kutba (as per Rattan Singh Bhangu), the first they had come across since morning. Suddenly the bloodshed ceased as the two forces went to the water to quench their thirst and relax their tired limbs. The Afghans and their horses rested at the banks of the pond.

Abdali ceased hostilities at Kutba and Bahmania villages. As per local lore, cries (jaikaras) of 'Bole So Nihal - Sat Sri Akal' could be heard being yelled from the Malwa, which were Malwai Sikh reinforcements. The Afghans retreated on hearing these battle cries of fresh bodies of Sikhs. Another reason for their withdrawal was that the Durranis were warned by the local populace that the upcoming area of Punjab they would have to traverse through to continue assailing the Sikhs was heavily dominated by Sikh-populated villages with few bodies of water to be found. It is also said that some Afghans tried attacking the re-hydrated Sikhs but were repelled.

From that point on the two forces went their separate ways. The Afghan forces had inflicted great losses on the Sikh nation and had in turn many of them killed and wounded; they were exhausted having not had any rest in two days. Abdali was also wary of following them in the little-ventured, semi-arid lands of the Malwa region. The Malwai jathas then assisted the surviving Sikhs and led them to safety to the Malwai villages. The remainder of the Sikhs proceeded into the semi-desert toward Barnala. From there on, the surviving Sikhs took advantage of the cover of night and proceeded to Bathinda, Kotkapura, and Faridkot. The local Malwai Sikhs provided the survivors with varied foods and milk and allowed them to rest at their localities. Some writers postulate that the fighting continued all the way until Gehal village in Barnala district.

Even just after being slaughtered, the Sikhs remained in high-spirits (chardi kala) after the hostilities ceased, with a Nihang proclaiming in the evening of the same day:

"... the fake [referring to the slaughtered Sikhs] has been shed. The true Khalsa remains intact."

— Rattan Singh Bhangu, Prachin Panth Prakash

Jassa Singh Ahluwalia personally suffered 22 wounds on his body from this day whilst Charat Singh sustained 16 wounds. Both survived, however.

The massacre was not only a physical loss of life for the Sikhs but also a religious and cultural loss since the original manuscript of the Damdami Bir of the Guru Granth Sahib, which had been compiled by Guru Gobind Singh and Bhai Mani Singh themselves, was lost during the carnage of this day.

The roads of the route were littered with dead Sikh bodies after the massacre. Abdali instructed his forces to dismember the heads of the corpses and load them onto carts to take back to Lahore.

Abdali returned to Lahore on 3 March 1762 with 50 carts full of Sikh heads obtained from the massacre to invoke fear into the local Sikh inhabitants of the city. Many Sikh captives were also brought with him. Pyramids of the severed Sikh heads were erected outside Delhi Gate and the blood of Sikhs was used to "wash" the walls of mosques in the city to "cleanse" them. Ahmad Shah Durrani's army returned to the capital of Lahore with hundreds of Sikhs in chains. From the capital, Durrani returned to Amritsar and blew up the Harmandir Sahib on 10 April 1762 on the day of the Vaisakhi festival, which since 1757 the Sikhs had rebuilt. As a deliberate act of sacrilege, the pool around it was filled with cow carcasses. However, when Abdali blew up the temple this time around, a flying brick from the explosion is said to have struck him on his nose and he received an injury he would never recover from.

=== Neutrality of Ala Singh ===
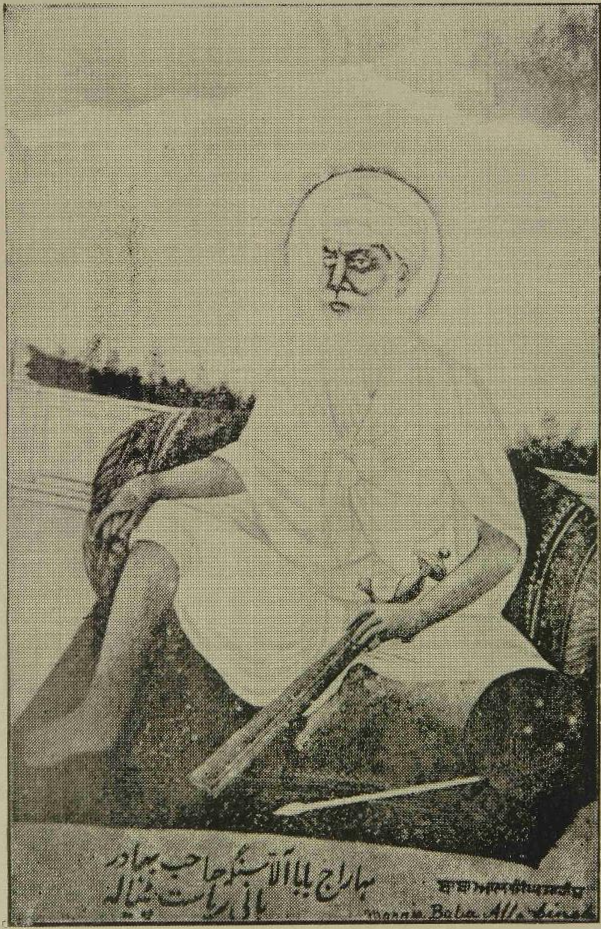
Painting depicting Ala Singh of the Phulkian Misl, founder of Patiala State, inscribed below in Perso-Arabic script.

Ala Singh failed to assist his religious kin. He stayed neutral during the events and did not initiate hostilities against the Durranis. However, this neutrality would not save Ala Singh as Abdali, whom had been told that Ala Singh was a "secret ally of the Majhi Sikhs" by Zain Khan and Bikhan Khan, would later burn down Barnala and advanced upon Bhawanigarh, where Ala Singh was holed up. Ala Singh sought out the help of Najib-ud-Daula and was forced to pay a humiliating fee of "five lakhs of rupees as tribute and a hundred and twenty-five thousand rupees more for permission to appear before him with his long hair intact" to placate Abdali. After this, Ala Singh was detained for a short-while but was released on the promise that his polity would pay an annual tribute to the Durranis.

Kirpal Singh argues that Ala Singh did assist his co-religionists during the massacre. He states that the vakil of Ala Singh, named Sekhu Singh Hambalka, was with the surrounded Sikhs during the massacre at Kup. He claims that Sekhu Singh and Sangu Singh were ordered to lead the Sikh women and children to Barnala and Thikriwala for safety, which were within Ala Singh's territory. This is evidenced in the Khazana-i-Amara, which states that a report of 200,000 fleeing Sikhs sought safety in Sirhind and near the territory of "Ala Singh Jat" was made when Abdali reached Lahore. By the time Abdali reached Barnala, Ala Singh had already managed to escape. This damaged Ala Singh's relations with Abadali, whom was already being told negativities about Ala Singh by the diwan Lakhshami Narain. Thus, Ala Singh was arrested and nearly had his kesh (uncut hair of Sikhs) cut-off but managed to pay a fee instead.

== Estimate of total Sikh dead ==
Estimates for the number of Sikh dead range from a lower estimate of 5,000 to a higher figure of 50,000.

A contemporary Muslim chronicler named Tahmas Khan Miskin, who was a commander of a contingent in Abdali's army, estimated that 25,000 Sikhs were killed, which The Encyclopedia of Sikhism believes is more reliable. Ratan Singh Bhangu gives a higher figure of 30,000. Jadunath Sarkar gives a much smaller estimate of 10,000, a figure which Teja Singh and Ganda Singh affirm. Kirpal Singh stated that 12,000–15,000 Sikh men were killed during the event. Kahn Singh Nabha believed 15,000–20,000 Sikhs were killed but also stated an equal number of enemy forces (including hostile local villagers) had suffered the same number of dead. Beant Singh Bajwa gave a figure of 25,000–30,000 Sikh dead and 10,000 injured Sikhs. Trilochan Singh claims 35,000-40,000 Sikhs had died. Amrit Kaur states a figure of 40,000. Ratan Singh Jaggi estimates 20,000 Sikhs were killed. Rattan Singh Bhangu gave a figure of 50,000 Sikhs killed in his Panth Prakash, whilst his uncle (firsthand witness) claimed 30,000 Sikhs were killed. Muhammad Latif Ansari gives an estimate range between 12,000–30,000 for the number of Sikh dead. Joseph Davey Cunningham gave an estimate between 12,000–20,000. N. K. Sinha states 25,000 Sikh deaths whilst H. R. Gupta believes 12,000 Sikhs died. A local Gurdwara, built in memory of the day, published a booklet which asserted that "approximately 35,000 Singhs [Sikh men], Singhnia [Sikh women] and Bhujangis ['little snakes', referring to Sikh children]" had been killed that day. J. S. Grewal gave a lower figure of 5,000 Sikh men (referred to him as Singhs) dying during the carnage.

== Aftermath ==
After two months Sikh again assembled and defeated Afghans in Battle of Harnaulgarh. Within three months of the massacre, the Sikhs attacked Zain Khan, who had participated in the slaughter. Zain Khan ended up bribing the Sikhs with a 50,000 ruppee payment in May. The Sikhs lay wreck on the Lahore region and Jalandhar Doab during July and August of the same year (1762), Ahmad Shah Abdali was powerless to stop them. The Sikhs were victorious in the 17 October 1762.

The Sikh warriors did not forget the local residents of the villages of Kup, Rahira, Kutba, and Bahmania turning away and even slaughtering pleading Sikhs seeking shelter with them. In revenge, they would raze these villages to the ground. There remains ruins of the former structures of Rahira to this day, near Gurdwara Shaheed Ganj Vadda Ghuallughara Sahib. Later, a 125-foot high Nishan Sahib was erected on-top of the ruins.

== Historiography ==
A first-hand account of the Vadda Ghalughara is presented in the Tahmasnama, written by Tahmas Khan Miskin, a Turkic commander of Zain Khan of Sirhind's army and a scholar who was present during the massacre. A Sikh account of the genocide can be found in Rattan Singh Bhangu's 19th century work Panth Prakash, specifically in the episode Sakhi Ghallughare au Malerahi au Kuparhirai ki ("Eye-witness account of Kup-Rahira-Malerkotla Ghallughara") found in the work. Rattan Singh had a number of eyewitnesses within his social-circle he consulted in-order to prepare his account of the event.

== Legacy ==
For a long time, no memorial was constructed commemorating the massacre due to the local population of Kup, Rahira, Kutba, and Bahmania villages being heavily dominated by Muslims originally, descendants of the same villagers who slaughtered Sikhs who sought shelter from them during the massacre. After the 1947 partition of Punjab, a monument was constructed and several gurdwaras were built along the route of the massacre, such as two named 'Gurdwara Shahid Ganj Vadda Ghallughara Sahib' at Rahira village with a monument constructed nearby commemorating the event. A local railway station was renamed 'Ghallughara Rahira Railway Station' in-memory of the history of the area. At Kutba village, a gurdwara named 'Gurdwara Att Vadda Ghallughara Sahib' was established and a Nishan Sahib (Sikh religious flag) was erected on the bank of the historical dhab (body of water) that both forces stopped and rested at to replenish their thirst in-midst of the action of that day. However, in 1970–1971, the historical dhab was filled with earth admixed with ploughable soil and was distributed as agricultural land to local farmers, so the historical body of water no longer exists. A gurdwara named 'Gurdwara Dhab Sahib' was constructed on the former location of the dhab. At Gehal village, a gurdwara commemorating the event was erected within the complex of the local 'Gurdwara Sri Guru Har Rai Sahib'. A memorial was inaugurated by Parkash Singh Badal in 2011 at Kup-Rahira in Sangrur district but it faces mismanagement and neglect, receiving few visitors. The Kutba Ghallughara Yadgari Gurdwara Committee operates in Kutba.

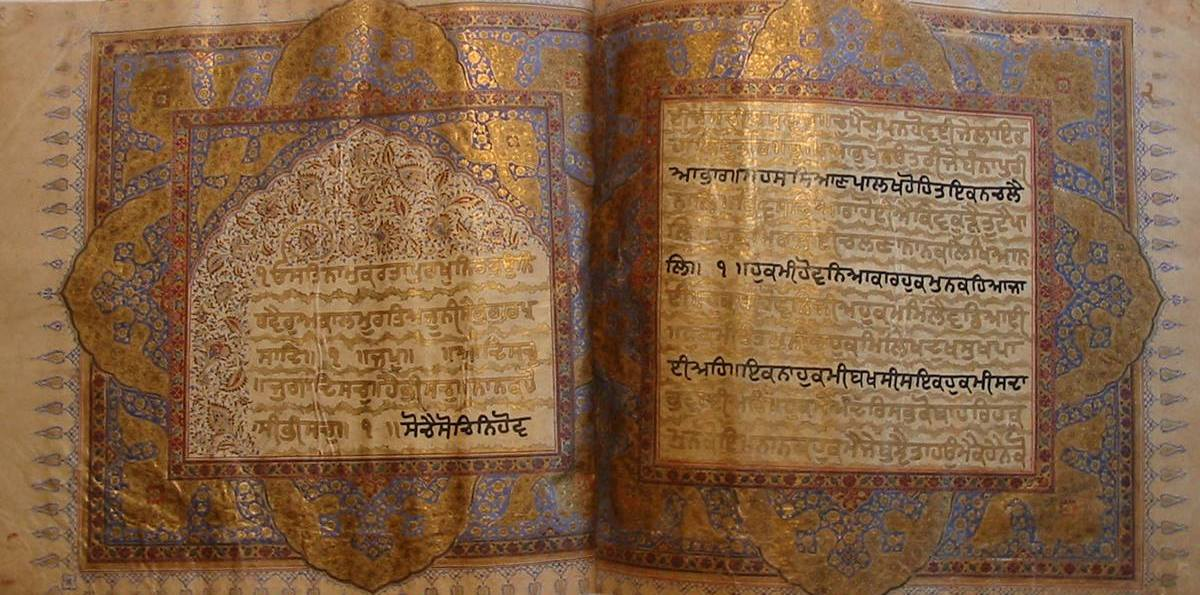
Folios of a claimed master-copy of the Damdami Bir recension rescued during the Vadda Ghallughara, kept at Gurdwara Shaheed Baba Sudha Singh Ji in Kuthala, Punjab

There is a handwritten bir (Sikh scriptural manuscript), supposedly one of five master copies of the Damdama Bir recension, present at Gurdwara Shaheed Baba Sudha Singh Ji in Kuthala that was saved by Baba Sudha Singh during the massacre, who had lost all nineteen of his followers during the killings. A painting depicting the massacre was made by Kirpal Singh in 1965.

== See also ==
- Chhota Ghallughara
- Jallianwala Bagh massacre
- Patharighat massacre
- List of massacres in India
- Battle of Kup
