= Battle of Kup =

1762 battle

- Part of Afghan–Sikh Wars, Indian Campaign of Ahmad Shah Durrani and Vadda Ghalughara
Date	5 February 1762
Location	Kup
Result	Afghan victory

Belligerents
Durrani Empire	Sikh Confederacy

Commanders and leaders
Ahmad Shah Durrani; Jahan Khan; Shah Wali Khan; Zain Khan Sirhindi; Bhikhan Khan; Murtaza Khan Baraich; Qasim Khan Marhal; Lachhmi Narayan	Jassa Singh Ahluwalia (WIA); Charat Singh (WIA); Jassa Singh Ramgarhia; Baghel Singh; Hari Singh Dhillon

Strength
Unknown, but believed to be larger (According to Khuswant Singh) Many Ranghar Villagers	30,000 Soldiers and Non Combatants (According to Tom Landsford) 50,000 Soldiers and 5,000 Non Combatants (According to Hari Ram Gupta)

Casualties and losses
Unknown	5,000 to 30,000

The Battle of Kup (part of the Vadda Ghalughara, meaning "greater massacre") was fought on 5 February 1762, between the Afghan forces of Ahmad Shah Durrani and the Sikhs, under the command of Jassa Singh Ahluwalia and Charat Singh. Ahmad Shah Durrani and the Afghan forces reached Malerkotla, west of Sirhind. They were met by between 30,000 and 50,000 Sikhs. Abdali's forces outnumbered the Sikhs in hand-to-hand combat and the Sikhs couldn't use their usual tactics of hit and run, but had to engage in battle while protecting the civilians at the same time. The Sikhs created a human ring around civilians as protection and fought the battle as they advanced towards Barnala. Abdali was able to break the ring and carried out a full scale massacre of the Sikh civilians. Ahmad Shah's forces killed several thousand Sikhs, and the surviving Sikhs fled to Barnala. According to various different estimates, as many as 5,000 to 30,000 Sikh men, women, elderly and children were killed in what is known as the second Sikh genocide (Vadda Ghalughara).

== Background ==
In 1758, Sikh Misls, Adina Beg and the Marathas, conquered Lahore and captured Afghan soldiers who were responsible for filling the Amritsar Sarovar with debris a few months earlier. They were brought to Amritsar and made to clean the Sarovar (holy tank). Ahmed Shah Abdali came again in October 1759 to crush the Maratha Empire. The Sikhs gave him a good fight and killed more than 2,000 of his soldiers. Instead of getting involved with the Sikhs, he made a rapid advance to Delhi. The Dal Khalsa decided to collect revenues from Lahore to prove to the people that the Sikhs were the rulers of the state. The Governor of Lahore closed the gates of the city and did not come out to fight against them. The Sikhs laid siege to the city. After a week, the Governor agreed to pay 30,000 rupees to the Sikhs.

Ahmed Shah Abdali returned from Delhi in March 1761 after defeating Marathas in Third Battle of Panipat with much gold and more than 22,000 girls as prisoners who were to be sold to the Afghans in Kabul. When Abdali was crossing the river Beas, the Sikhs swiftly fell upon the withdrawing force. They freed around 2,000 of the women prisoners and escorted them back to their homes. The Sikhs seized Lahore in September 1761, after Abdali returned to Kabul.

The Khalsa minted their coins in the name of Guru Nanak Dev. Sikhs, as rulers of the city, received full cooperation from the people. After becoming the Governor of Lahore, Punjab Jassa Singh Ahluwalia was given the title of Sultan-ul-Kaum (Authority of the Nation).

== Battle ==
When Ahmad Shah Durrani returned for his sixth campaign of conquest (his fifth being in 1759–1761), Sikh fighters were residing in the town of Jandiala, 18 kilometres (11 mi) east of Amritsar. The place was the home of Aqil, the head of the Nirinjania sect, a friend of the Afghans, and an inveterate enemy of the Sikhs.

Aqil sent messengers to Durrani pleading for his help against the marauding Sikhs. The Afghan forces hurried to Jandiala, but by the time they arrived the siege had been lifted and the besiegers were gone.

The Sikh fighters had retreated with the view of taking their families to safety in the Haryana desert east of their location before returning to confront the Afghan invaders. When the Afghan leader came to know of the whereabouts of the Sikhs he sent word ahead to his allies in Malerkotla and Sirhind to stop their advance. Durrani then in less than 48 hours set about on a rapid march, covering the distance of 240 kilometres (150 mi) and including two river crossings.

In twilight Durrani and his allies surprised the Sikhs who numbered between 30,000 and 50,000. Lansford states that most of them were non combatants, while Gupta states that most were soldiers, and that only 5,000 were non combatants encamped at Pind Garma. With the Durrani forces outnumbering the Sikhs, the Sikh fighters decided that they would form an armed cordon around the slow-moving baggage train consisting of women, children and old men. Then they would make their way to the desert in the south-west by the town of Barnala, where they expected their ally Ala Singh of Patiala to come to their rescue. Several Durrani fighters were killed by the Sikhs while trying to protect the cordon where Qasim Khan fled the battle with his troops to Malerkotla. Many non-combatants upon reaching the village of Gahal, pleaded for shelter but the villagers in fear of the repercussion from the Durranis, did not open their door and so the non-combatants rushed to the villages of Qutba and Bahmani to seek shelter but the occupants of these villages were the hostile Ranghars. On the order of their leader, the Ranghar villagers surrounded and attacked the Sikh non-combatants, plundering and massacring them and then moved on to attack the non-combatants outside of their villages but Charat Singh immediately rushed back to protect the remaining non-combatants and drive away the Ranghars.

A secondhand account by the son and nephew of two eyewitnesses describes the Sikhs. "Fighting while moving and moving while fighting, they kept the baggage train marching, covering it as a hen covers its chicks under its wings." More than once, the troops of the Afghan invader broke the cordon and mercilessly butchered the women, children and elderly inside, but each time the Sikh warriors regrouped and managed to push back the attackers.

By early afternoon, the fighting cavalcade reached a large pond, the first they had come across since morning. Suddenly the bloodshed ceased as the two forces went to the water to quench their thirst and relax their tired limbs.

== Aftermath ==
From that point on the two forces went their separate ways. The Sikhs suffered great losses where many of them were killed and wounded as they were exhausted having not had any rest in two days. The remainder of the Sikhs proceeded into the semi-desert toward Barnala. From the capital Lahore, Durrani returned to Amritsar and blew up the Harmandir Sahib which since 1757 the Sikhs had rebuilt. As a deliberate act of sacrilege, the pool around it was filled with cow carcasses. It was estimated that 5,000 to 30,000 Sikhs were killed on 5 February 1762.
