= Tahmas Khan Miskin =

Turkish slave and writer in Mughal India (c. 1730s–40s – 1802)

Tahmas Khan Miskin (c. 1730s–40s – 1802) was an 18th-century Turkish slave, soldier, and writer, being the author of the Persian work Kitāb-i Qiṣṣa-i Tahmās Miskīn, often simply called Tahmās Nāma, which recorded historical details relevant to Punjab and Delhi. Some personalities and events he was an eyewitness of and wrote about include Mughlani Begum, the Vadda Ghallughara, and Abdul Ahad's Patiala campaign.

== Name ==
His full name was Muhkam al-Daula, Itiqad-i Jang, Tahmas Beg Khan Bahadur but his nom de plume was Miskin.

== Biography ==
Miskin was originally from Turkey but was abducted in the 1740s at the age of around five, being enslaved subsequently. He was later kept as a slave in Iran and Multan. Miskin claimed to have been brought to India originally as a slave of an Uzbek. Eventually, he was gifted to Moin-ul-Mulk, the Mughal subahdar of Lahore, with him being a soldier. After his master died in 1753, he became the possession of his widow, Mughlani Begum, who would later free him from the bondage of slavery. He wrote a historical work in either 1780 or 1782, recording events that he recounted from throughout his life, some of which he experienced first-hand. He died in 1802, with the details of his later life not being well-known.

== Legacy ==
His work, containing claimed, first-hand accounts of historical events, has been analyzed and partially translated by scholars, namely Jadunath Sarkar for his work The Fall of the Mughal Empire and by Setumadhavarao Pagadi and Muhammad Aslam. However, Neelam Khoja cautions against taking his work at face-value and that a more careful approach is required, stating:

While this auto/biography does provide some insights on the eighteenth-century political history of the Punjab and Mughal Hindustan, it—more importantly, I would maintain—sheds light on the ethnic, religious, social, economic and gendered ‘lives’ of the author himself, and the people whom he includes in his narrative.

— Neelam Khoja, Historical Mistranslations: Identity, Slavery, and Genre in Eighteenth-Century India

His account of Mughlani Begum has been described as misogynistic, which may be rooted in the exploitation he suffered as a slave from his female master.

== Works ==
- Kitāb-i Qiṣṣa-i Tahmās Miskīn, also called, Tahmās Nāma ("Book of Tahmas Miskin's Story", or the "Tahmas Treatise", 1780 or 1782)
