= Ghallughara (Sikhism) =

Term for genocide in Sikhism

Ghallughara (Punjabi: ਘੱਲੂਘਾਰਾ, romanized: ghallūghārā Punjabi pronunciation: [kəl˨luːkäː˨ɾäː]) is a historical Punjabi concept in Sikhism for a holocaust, massacre, or genocide. This term refers to many historical massacres and genocides of Sikhs and it is deeply significant in Sikh history and consciousness, primarily with reference to three major events i.e. Chhota Ghallughara, the Vadda Ghallughara and the 1984 Ghallughara. The word Ghallughara first occurs in Ratan Singh Bhangu's Panth Prakash, specifically in an episode in the work titled Sakhi Ghallughare Ki (lit. 'eyewitness account of Ghallughara'). Much information of the two historical Ghallugharas of the 18th century are sourced from Bhangu's works, as he had eyewitness accounts to glean information from due to his family-background. The 1984 military operation at the Golden Temple in Amritsar, known as Operation Blue Star, is known by Sikhs as Tija Ghallughara (lit. 'third holocaust'), Ghallughara Dihara, or Ghallughara Diwas (lit. 'day of the genocide').
