= Ratan Singh Bhangu =

Sikh historian and warrior (1785–1846)

Akali Rattan Singh Bhangu Nihang
- Born: c. 1785
- Died: 10 February 1846
- Occupation: Historian
- Writing career
- Notable work: Panth Parkash

Ratan Singh Bhangu (c. 1785 – 10 February 1846) was a Sikh historian and Nihang who wrote about the Sikhs' struggles and rise to power in North India, in his book Prachin Panth Prakash. This work describes how the Sikh people came to dominate Punjab in the 1700s and remains one of the few historical accounts of the era.

== Life ==
Rattan Singh was likely born in 1785 and passed in 1846. According to G. S. Mann, it is more likely that Rattan Singh was born " in the middle years of the third quarter of the eighteenth century". His paternal grandfather was Mehtab Singh Mirankotia whilst his maternal grandfather was Sham Singh of Narli.

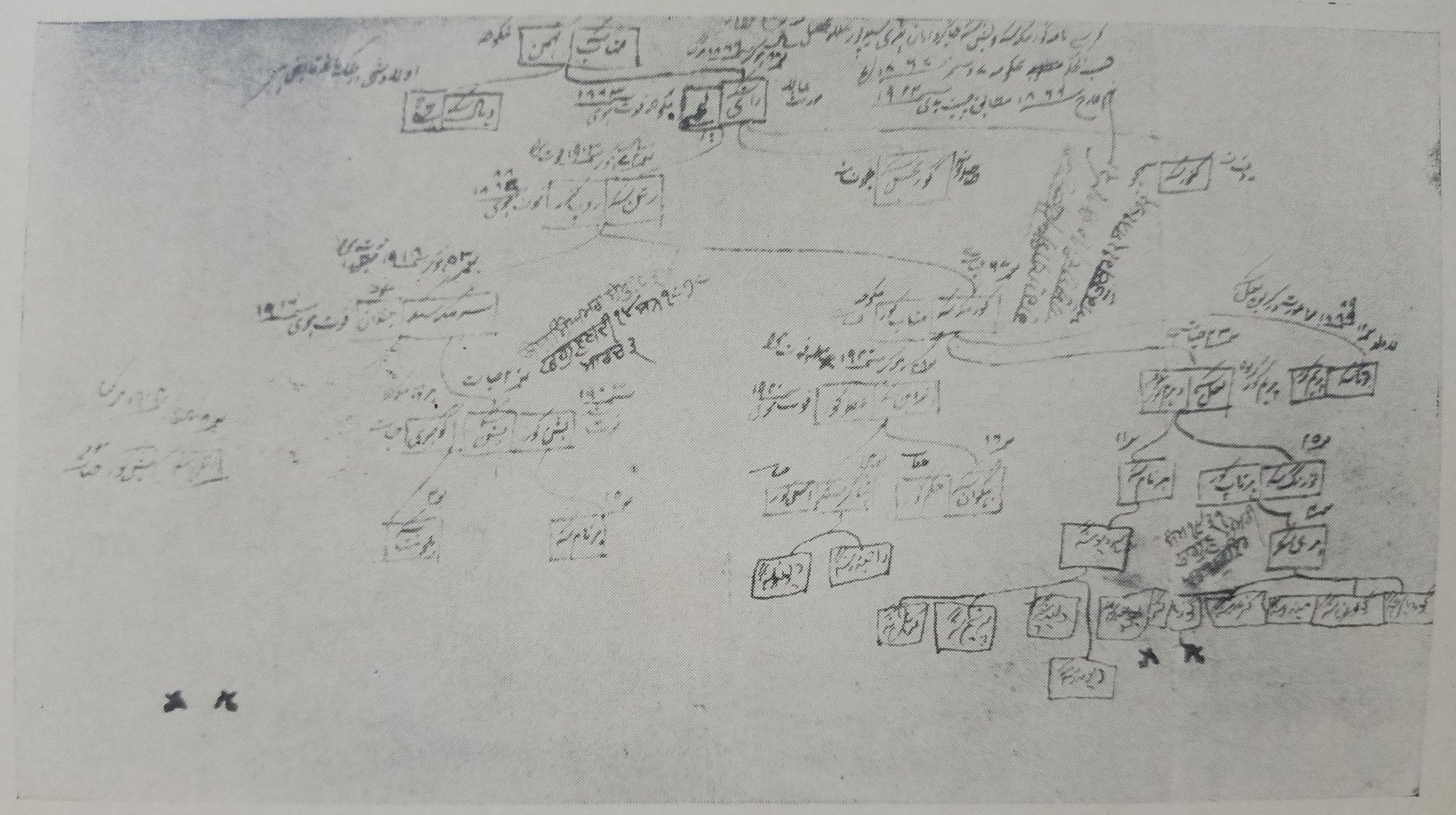
Genealogy (bansavalinama) of Ratan Singh Bhangu, this family tree of Bhangu was created by him, accompanying a Panth Prakash manuscript in Perso-Arabic script

His paternal grandfather, Mehtab Singh Bhangu, was a famous Sikh warrior who assassinated Massa Ranghar for defiling the Darbar Sahib (Golden Temple) in Amritsar. He began his work as a historian in 1809, and died in 1846 at the Battle of Sobraon. Rattan Singh's father, Rai Singh (d. 1810), had married the daughter of Sham Singh (d. 1739), who was the founder of Karor Singhnia Misal. Rattan Singh was one of four sons born to the couple, with Rattan being the third-born son.

Rattan Singh likely had background knowledge and access to Sikh works such as the Puratan Janam Sakhi (1580's), Bhai Gurdas' Vaaran (pre‑1630), Sainapati’s Sri Gur Sobha (pre-1710), and Sukha Singh’s Sri Gur Bilas (1797). He also had access to non-Sikh sources written in Sanskrit, Bhakha, and Persian. Rattan Singh had a four-village estate (jagir) centered at Bharhi, located near Ludhiana. Whilst travelling to his estate, Rattan came to learn that a local Ludhiana munshi named Bute Shah had been employed by the British East India Company to write reports for them on Sikh history. Rattan Singh was very critical about the decision to rely on Bute Shah to provide writings on Sikh history, as he found Bute Shah to be unknowledgeable, without resources, and without sympathies regarding the subject matter to carry-out the task adequately. Thus, Rattan Singh pleaded to Captain William Murray (1791–1831; public face of the regional army head, Colonel David Ochterlony) to hear-out his own accounts of Sikh history. Rattan and William likely met several times starting in 1809 to discuss the issue.

== Panth Prakash ==
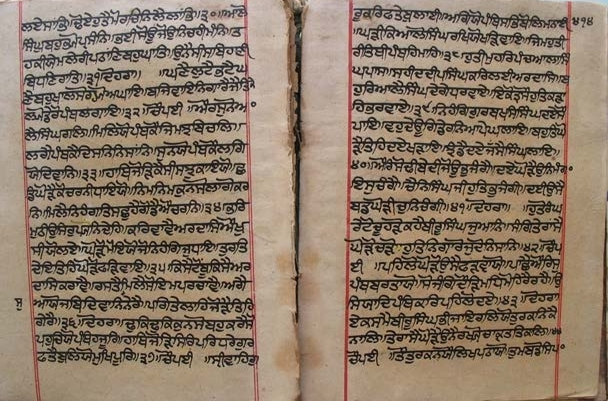
MS 1 of the Panth Prakash of Rattan Singh Bhangu, ca.1810–13 (folios 413 v. – 414 r.). According to G. S. Mann, this manuscript is possibly the original one, authored by the original author himself.

Bhangu is primarily known for his historical text, (Pracheen) Panth Prakash (Gurmukhi: ਪ੍ਰਾਚੀਨ ਪੰਥ ਪ੍ਰਕਾਸ਼). (Note: The original title of the work was 'Panth Prakash', it is not to be confused with a later work with a similar name by Giani Gian Singh, in-which it is differentiated from it by the addition of the word 'Prachin' meaning "old" before the title.) He was approached by the British East India Company who wished to know how the Sikhs rose to power in the Punjab Region. Vir Singh believes the text was completed in 1841. However, Gurinder Mann suggests the work was completed in the early 1810's. Vir Singh is believed to the first to publish the text in 1914. In 2004, Balwant Singh Dhillon published a revised larger version of the text utilising manuscripts, including the material that was excised in Vir Singh's version. Scholars like Fenech and Harinder Singh have documented the various edits by Vir Singh (writer) in their scholarship, see Bhai Vir Singh’s Editing of Panth Prakāsh by Rattan Singh Bhangu.

Bhangu was a member of the ruling Sikh aristocracy and had first-hand knowledge of the struggle and success of the Khalsa. Due to lack of written records at the time, the work was primarily compiled from oral histories, including interviews, family history, and information collected from British and French officers in Punjab. The work describes how the Sikh people successfully came to rule over Punjab. Some of the persons Bhangu consulted to write the work includes his father, maternal grandfather, two uncles, Sukha Singh and perhaps some others who had participated in the battles. This work remains to this day one of the only historical accounts of the Sikh people during this era. Dhavan writes that Rattan Singh's account "has become one of the foundational sources for Sikh history." His coverage of the two ghallugharas of the 18th century are especially helpful due to the resources he had to acquire information.

== See also ==
- Suraj Parkash
- Kavi Santokh Singh
- Pundit Tara Singh Narotam
- Giani Gian Singh
