= Aqil Das =

Aqil Das (fl. 18th century), also known as Harbhagat Niranjania, was the head (guru) of the unorthodox Hindali sect of Sikhism based out of Jandiala. According to Sikh sources, he acted as a spy against the Sikhs for the Mughal and Durrani administrations, and provided information on the whereabouts of prominent Sikhs, such as Mehtab Singh and Taru Singh.

== Relations with Sikhs ==
The Sikhs strongly disliked Aqil Das due to him being seen as a traitor who spied on the Sikhs, leading to the deaths of prominent Sikh figures. The annual Diwali convening of the Sarbat Khalsa at Amritsar on 27 October 1761 had passed a gurmatta that supporters of the Durranis must be eliminated, beginning with Aqil Das (based in Jandiala), to prepare to establish independence of the region from invading and occupying Afghan forces. After coming to know about this judgement made against him, Aqil Das sought out the help of Abdali. Another decision passed in the gurmatta was that Sikhs should take Lahore and occupy it.

In January 1762, Sikh fighters then converged onto Jandiala, 18 kilometres (11 mi) east of Amritsar. The Sikh forces were laying siege against the stronghold of the heretical Hindali sect led by Aqil Das. The place was the home of Aqil Das, the head of the heretical Nirinjania (Hindali) sect, an ally of the Afghans, and an inveterate enemy of the Sikhs. He was a known informant for the Islamic governments working against the Sikhs. Due to his past actions, many Sikhs had been killed.

Aqil sent messengers to Durrani pleading for his help against the Sikhs. The envoys of Aqil met with Abdali at Rohtas when the latter was advancing to begin his sixth invasion, with the goal of annihilating the Sikhs. After coming to learn of the trouble his ally was in, Abdali's forces hurried to Lahore and the next day reached Jandiala to relieve the siege, but by the time they arrived the siege had been lifted and the Sikh besiegers were already gone.
