= Bhanguri =

- Village
- Location in Punjab, India Bhanguri (India)
- Coordinates: 32.3885252°N 75.8143154°E
- Country: India
- State: Punjab
- District: Pathankot
- Tehsil: Dhar Kalan

Government
  - Type: Panchayat raj
  - Body: Gram panchayat

Area
  - Total: 808 ha (2,000 acres)
- Elevation: 524 m (1,719 ft)

Population (2011)
  - Total: 1,695
  - Density: 210/km^{2} (543/sq mi)
  - Total Households: 336
- Sex ratio 846/849 ♂/♀

Languages
  - Official: Punjabi, Hindi
- Time zone: UTC+5:30 (IST)
- PIN: 145022
- Telephone: 01870
- ISO 3166 code: IN-PB
- Vehicle registration: PB-06
- Website: pathankot.nic.in

Bhanguri is a village in Dhar Kalan tehsil in Pathankot district of Punjab State, India. It is located 5 kilometres (3.1 mi) from Pathankot City, the district headquarters and 265 kilometres (165 mi) from state capital Chandigarh. The village is administrated by Sarpanch an elected representative of the village.

== Demography ==
As of 2011, the village has a total number of 336 houses and a population of 1695 of which 846 are males while 849 are females according to the report published by Census India in 2011. The literacy rate of the village is 86.41%, highest than the state average of 75.84%. The population of children under the age of 6 years is 201 which is 11.86% of total population of the village, and child sex ratio is approximately 718 lower than the state average of 846.

Most of the people are from Schedule Caste which constitutes 19.53% of total population in the village. The town does not have any Schedule Tribe population so far.

As per census 2011, 485 people were engaged in work activities out of the total population of the village which includes 397 males and 88 females. According to census survey report 2011, 88.45% workers describe their work as main work and 11.55% workers are involved in marginal activity providing the livelihood for less than 6 months.

== Transport ==
The nearest train station is located 22 kilometres (14 mi) away in Dalhousie road and Sri Guru Ram Dass Jee International Airport is 162 kilometres (101 mi) away from the village.

== See also ==
- List of villages in India
