= Sukha Singh =

Sikh warrior

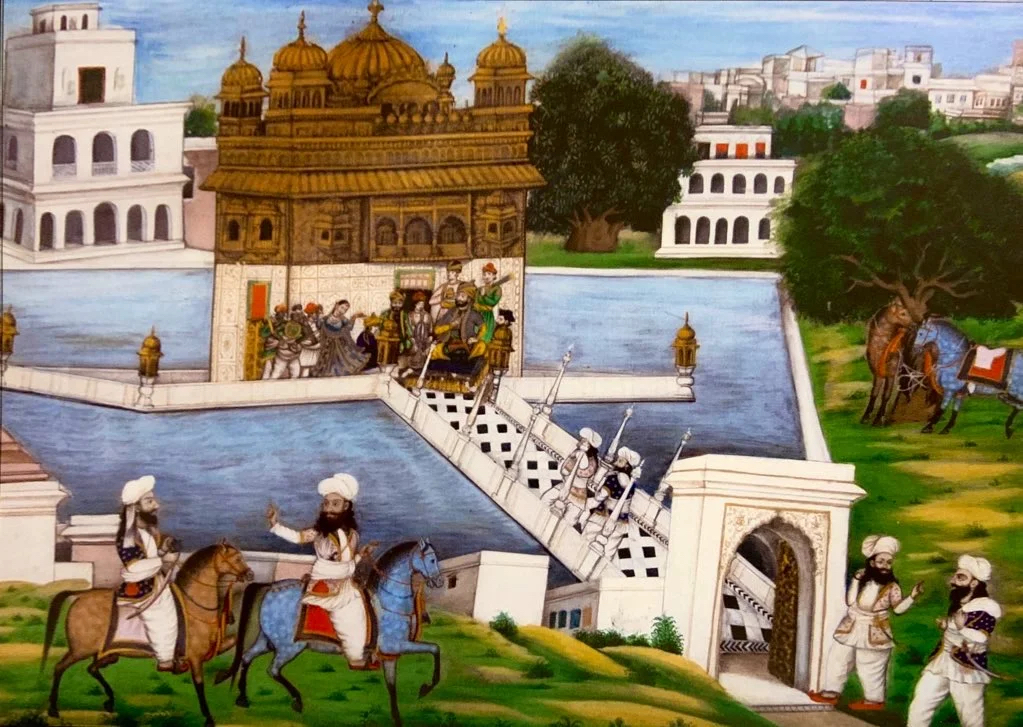
Depiction of a disguised Sukha Singh and Mehtab Singh confronting Massa Ranghar at Harmandir Sahib

Sukha Singh was a Sikh warrior from present-day Punjab, India. Kamboki near Amritsar. He was born to mother Bibi Haro and father Bhai Ladha. He is remembered for being one of the two assassins of Massa Ranghar, alongside Mehtab Singh. Sukha Singh was the adopted son of Sham Singh of Narli.

== Revenge at Harmandir Sahib ==
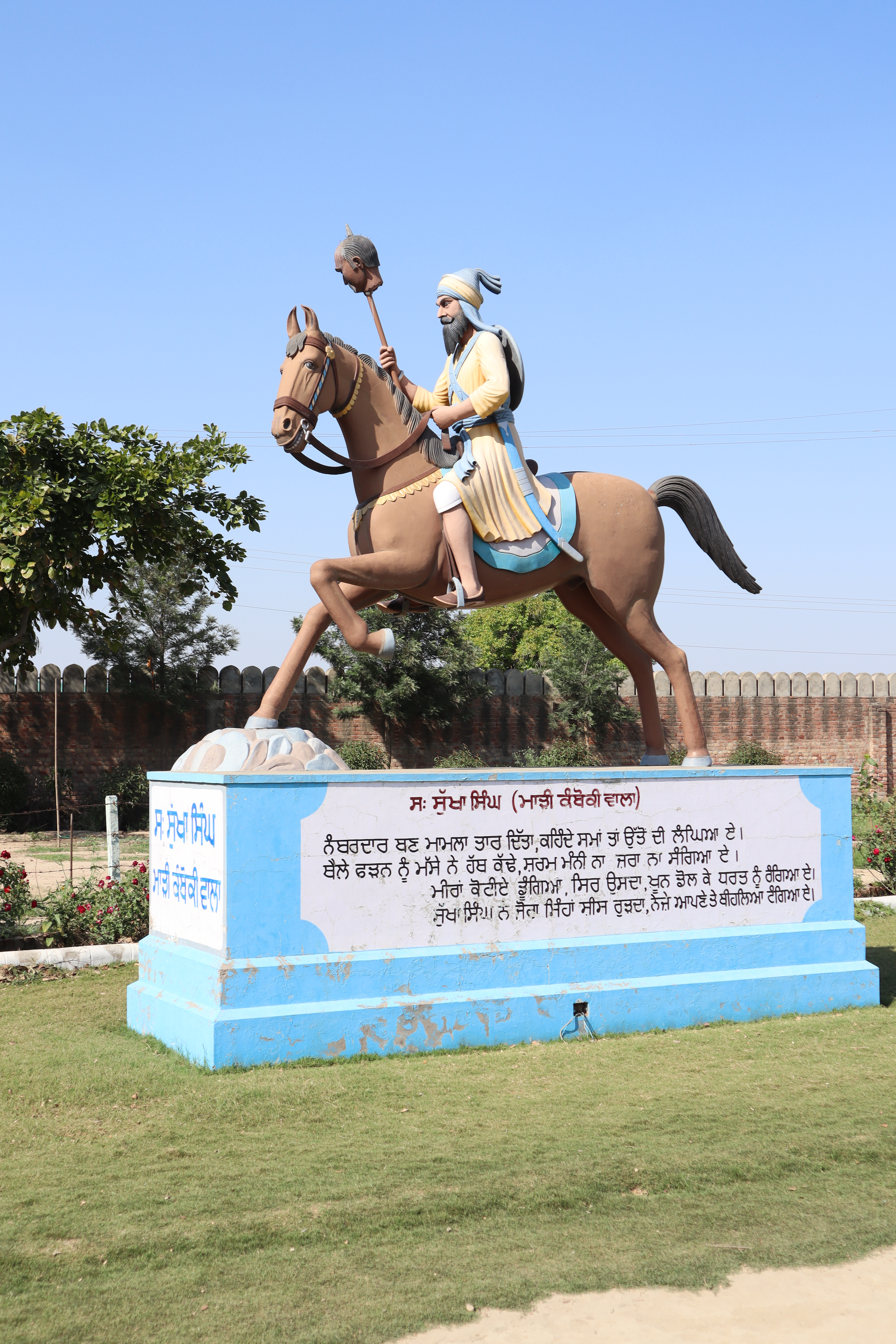
Equestrian statue of Sukha Singh of Mari Kamboki at Gurdwara Mehdiana Sahib, Mehdiana, Ludhiana district, Punjab, India, 9 April 2023

On 11 August 1740, they dressed up as landlords from Patti and entered the city of Amritsar. They reached Harmandir Sahib and then tied their horses to the berry tree and went inside the Harmandir Sahib carrying bags. Massa Ranghar was smoking shisha and watching dancing girls. The Sikhs threw the bags under Massa's bed and said that they had come to pay the revenue. Massa bent downwards to have a look at the bags. Mehtab Singh took his sword and slashed it at Massa's neck and cut off his head. Sukha Singh killed the guards of Massa Ranghar. They put Massa's head in a bag and rode their horses back to Talwandi Sabo the same evening. The next day they reached Bikaner and presented Massa Ranghar's head on a spear to the congregation (Dal) of Sikhs.

== See also ==
- Mehtab Singh Bhangu
