= Massa Ranghar =

Ranghar choudhary of Mandiala

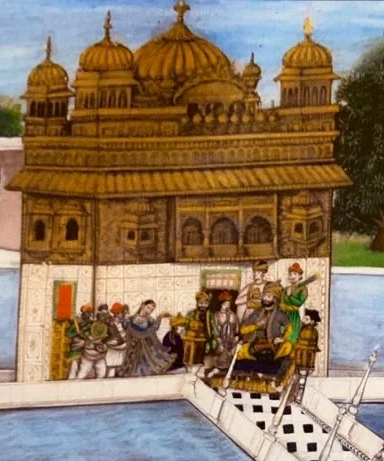
- Massa Ranghar being entertained by Nautch dancers at the Golden Temple in Amritsar
- Born: Musalal Khan
- Died: 11 August 1740 (aged 40); Amritsar, Punjab
- Religion: Islam

Massa Ranghar, formally Ranghar, also known by his birth name Musalal Khan was the Ranghar choudhary of Mandiala. In 1738, Qazi Abdul Razzaq was killed in an encounter with the Sikhs under Nawab Kapur Singh. The Subahdar (Governor) of Lahore Zakariya Khan Bahadur, appointed Massa Ranghar as the Commandant of Amritsar. He used the precincts of the Golden Temple for amusement with dancing girls. According to Ratan Singh Bhangu, he was assassinated by Mehtab Singh and Sukha Singh.

== Assassination ==
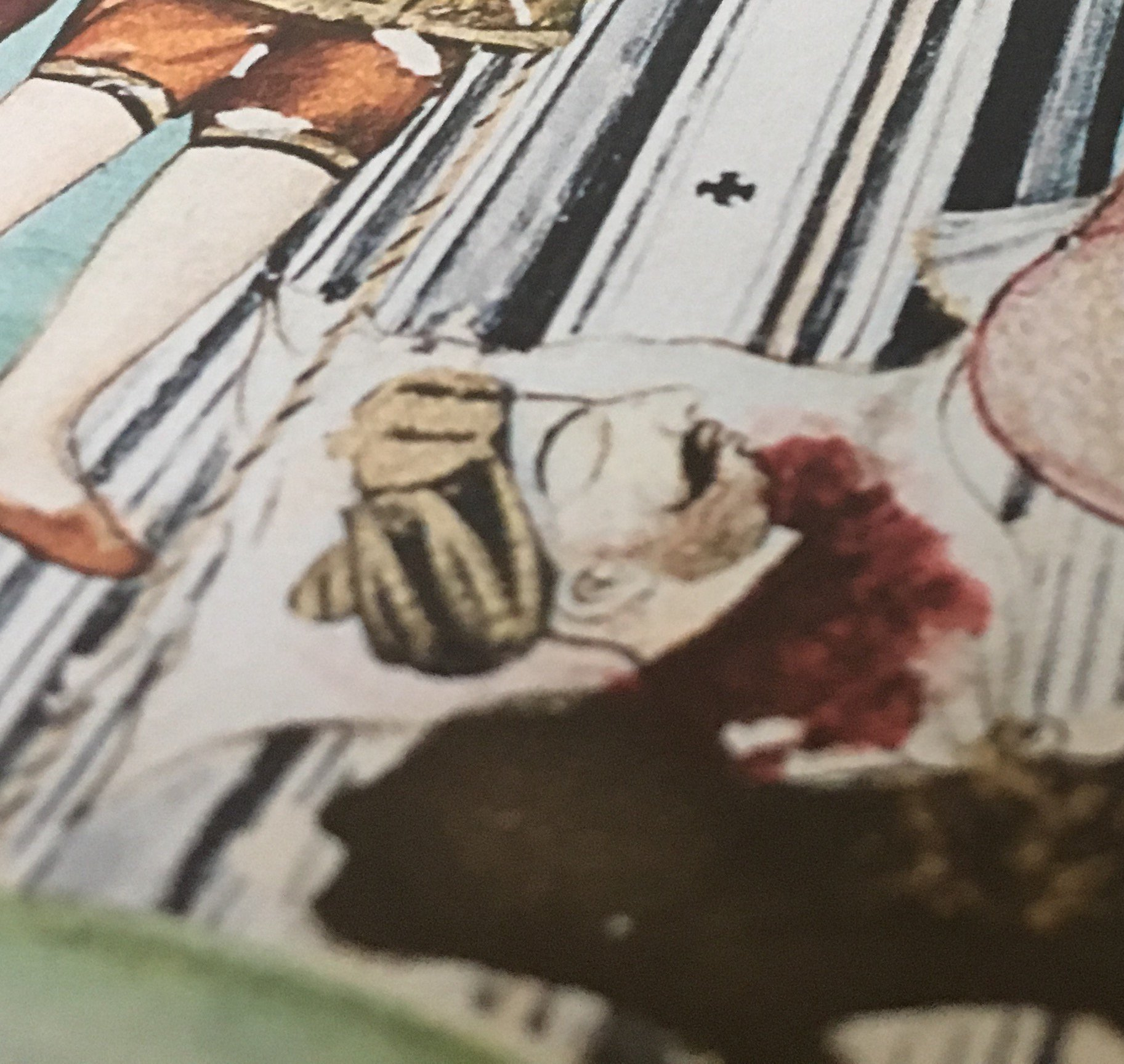
Severed head of Massa Ranghar, detail from a painting of Sukha Singh and Mehtab Singh returning with the severed head of Massa Ranghar, ca.1875

The news of this sacrilegious use of the gurdwara spread to the remote areas. According to Ratan Singh Bhangu, two Sikhs, Sukha Singh and Mehtab Singh, decided to kill Massa Ranghar. They disguised themselves as lambardars, entered the gurdwara and beheaded Massa Ranghar while he was enjoying the dance. Massa Ranghar was killed by Mehtab Singh, specifically.
