= Sri Gur Sobha =

Sikh text

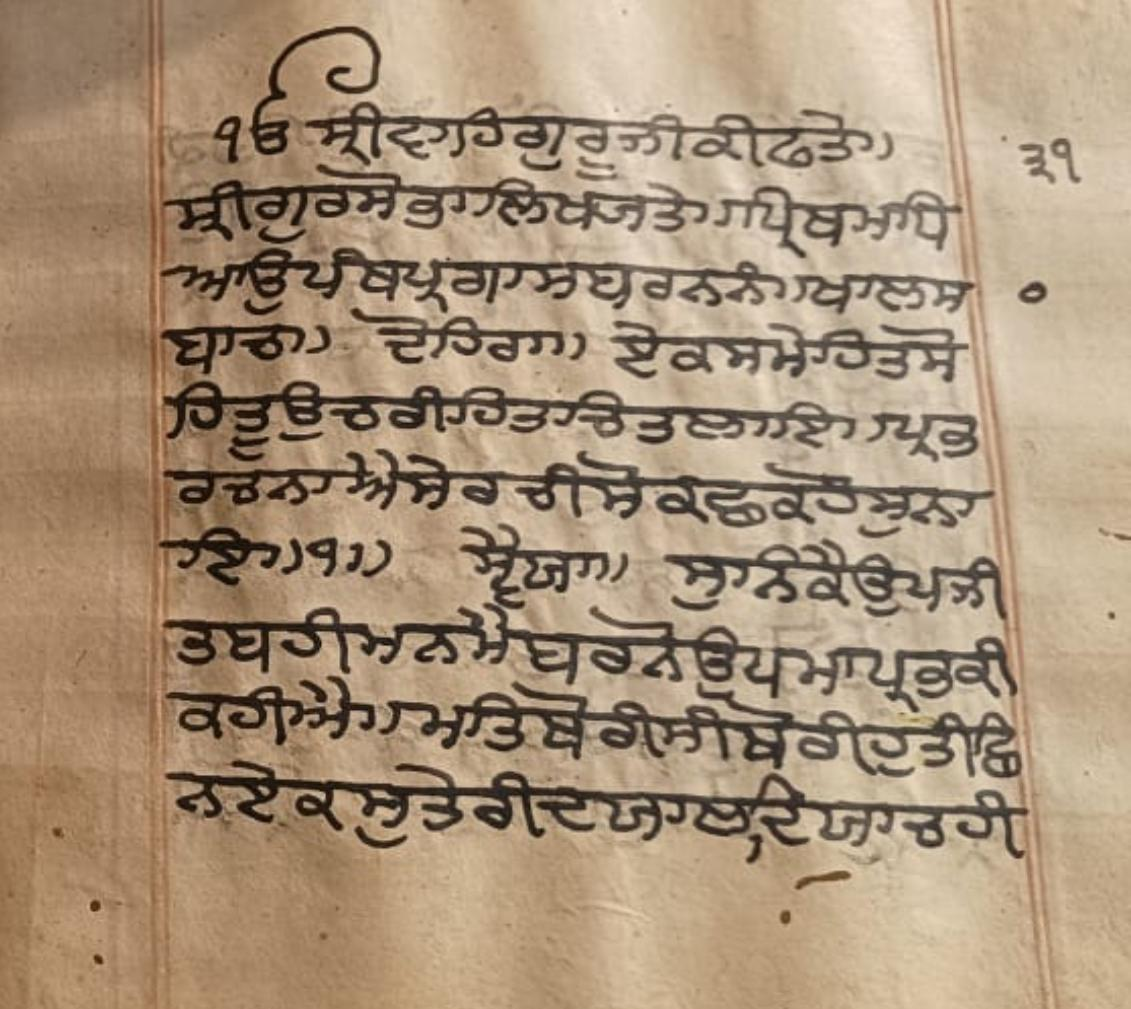
- Folio of a Sri Gur Sobha manuscript, circa 19th century
- Author: Sainapati
- Genre: Sikhism
- Publication date: 1711

Sri Gur Sobha, also known as Sri Gur Sobha Granth, is a poetic literary work written by the court-poet Sainapati that covers the life of Guru Gobind Singh and the establishment of the Khalsa order. It is one of the Gurbilases. The overarching motif of the work consists of praise of the tenth guru.

== Description ==
The title of the text translates to "radiance of the guru". It was the first text of the Gurbilas genre and it narrates the life of Guru Gobind Singh and the establishment of the Khalsa order. The text was written in Gurmukhi in a language that is described as a mixture of Braj and eastern Punjabi that is Sanskritized. Its content has been described as partly eulogizing and partly historical. According to Sikh scholar J. S. Grewal, the Sri Gur Sobha is based "partly on personal observation and partly on hearsay and poetic imagination." Within the work, certain historical events are described through poetry, such as specific battles that the Sikhs fought, Mughal in-fighting, diplomacy between the Sikhs and the Mughals, and the assassination attempt on the guru's life at Nanded in the Deccan. Thus, the work has historiographical significance. The work contains references to particular terms, such as misl, which it uses to describe a military unit, which helps our understanding of the meaning particular vocabulary held at the time.

=== Chapters ===
The work is divided into twenty chapters or cantos. Six out of twenty of the cantos directly eulogizes the Sikh guru or the Khalsa, with many of the rest of the cantos also containing laudatory lines. The name of each chapter and its general contents being as follows:

1. Panth Pragās Barnan – opens with introductory stanzas, gives a list of the ten Sikh gurus, and states that the reason Guru Gobind Singh established the Khalsa Panth was based upon a divine order.
2. Teg Pragās – describes the Battle of Bhangani.
3. Rājan Het Saṅgrām – describes the Battle of Nadaun.
4. battles with Khanzada and Hussain Khan
5. Bachan Pragās – end of the masand system and establishment of the Khalsa order.
6. Bachan Bichār – describing the paragon Khalsa.
7. Rahit Pragās – explaining the modus vivendi of the Khalsa, known as rehat.
8. First battle of Anandpur
9. Battle of Nirmohgarh
10. Battles of Basoli and Kalmot
11. Second battle of Anandpur
12. battle of Chamkaur
13. Kalā Pragās – covering the Guru Gobind Singh Marg, when the tenth guru escaped from Chamkaur and is travelling through the Malwa region, containing the battle of Muktsar and the Zafarnama epistle.
14. Kīchak Mār – journey toward the south and the battle of Baghaur.
15. Zikr Bādshāhī – Mughal war of succession (1707–1709)
16. Mulāqāt Bādshāh Kī – meeting with Mughal emperor Bahadur Shah.
17. Sāhibzādā kā Judh ar Zikr Rāh Kā – travels through Rajasthan and a skirmish at Chittorgarh.
18. Jotī Jot Samāvaṇā – death of Guru Gobind Singh
19. Agam Pragās – author's opinion on the future of the Khalsa
20. Sarb Upamā – obeisance to the all-pervading divine

== History ==
This text was completed by the court poet Sainapati in 1711. Sainapati was a patron poet of the Sikh guru. Whilst the author does not give his actual name or his pen-name in the work, the author can be identified through comparative analysis with works such as Chanakya Niti and Sri Sain Sukh, which were written by Sainapati.

Two manuscripts of the work were kept in the collection of the Sikh Reference Library at the Golden Temple complex in Amritsar but were lost in the events of Operation Blue Star in 1984.

=== Dating ===
The text itself claiming it was written on Bhadon sudi 15, 1758 Bk., corresponding to 6 September 1701 in the Gregorian calendar. However, since the work contains stories of Guru Gobind Singh's life from after 1701 and until his death in 1708, it is believed that 1701 is when the first draft of the Sri Gur Sobha was prepared by Sainapati, with the author working on it overtime until it was finished in 1711. According to Gurmukh Singh, Sainapati was enlarging the initial draft overtime in-order to produce the final work. As per Karamjit K. Malhotra, the work began being composed in 1701 and it was completed shortly after Guru Gobind Singh’s death in October 1708.

=== Publishing ===
The text fell into obscurity until it was rediscovered by Akali Kaur Singh and published by Bhai Nanak Singh Kirpal Singh Hazuria, Amritsar, in December 1925. Ganda Singh brought out another edition of the text that was published by the Punjabi University, Patiala in 1967.

== Translation ==
The text was translated into English by Kulwant Singh in 2014.
