= Mehtab Singh Bhangu =

Sikh warrior

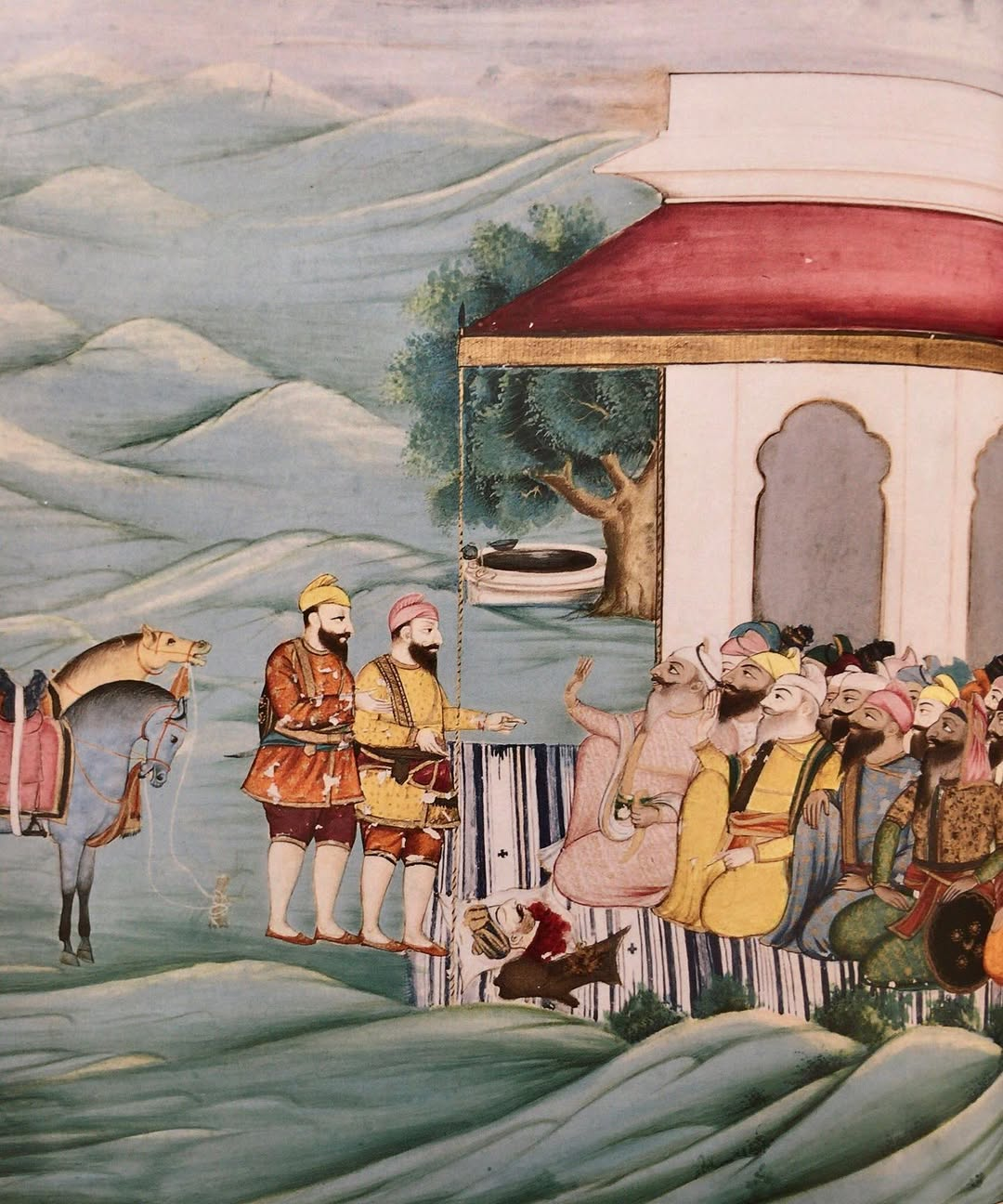
- Mehtab Singh and Sukha Singh return with severed head of Massa Ranghar
- Died: 1745
- Cause of death: Execution by being crushed to death on the spikes of a charkhari wheel

Mehtab Singh (died 1745), also known as Mahtab Singh Mirankotia, was a Sikh warrior and martyr. He is remembered by Sikhs for being one of the two assassins of Massa Ranghar, alongside Sukha Singh and as one of the notable Sikh martyrs of the 18th century.

== Background ==
Mehtab Singh was a Jat Sikh of the Bhangu clan hailing from Mirankot.

== Revenge at Harmandir Sahib ==
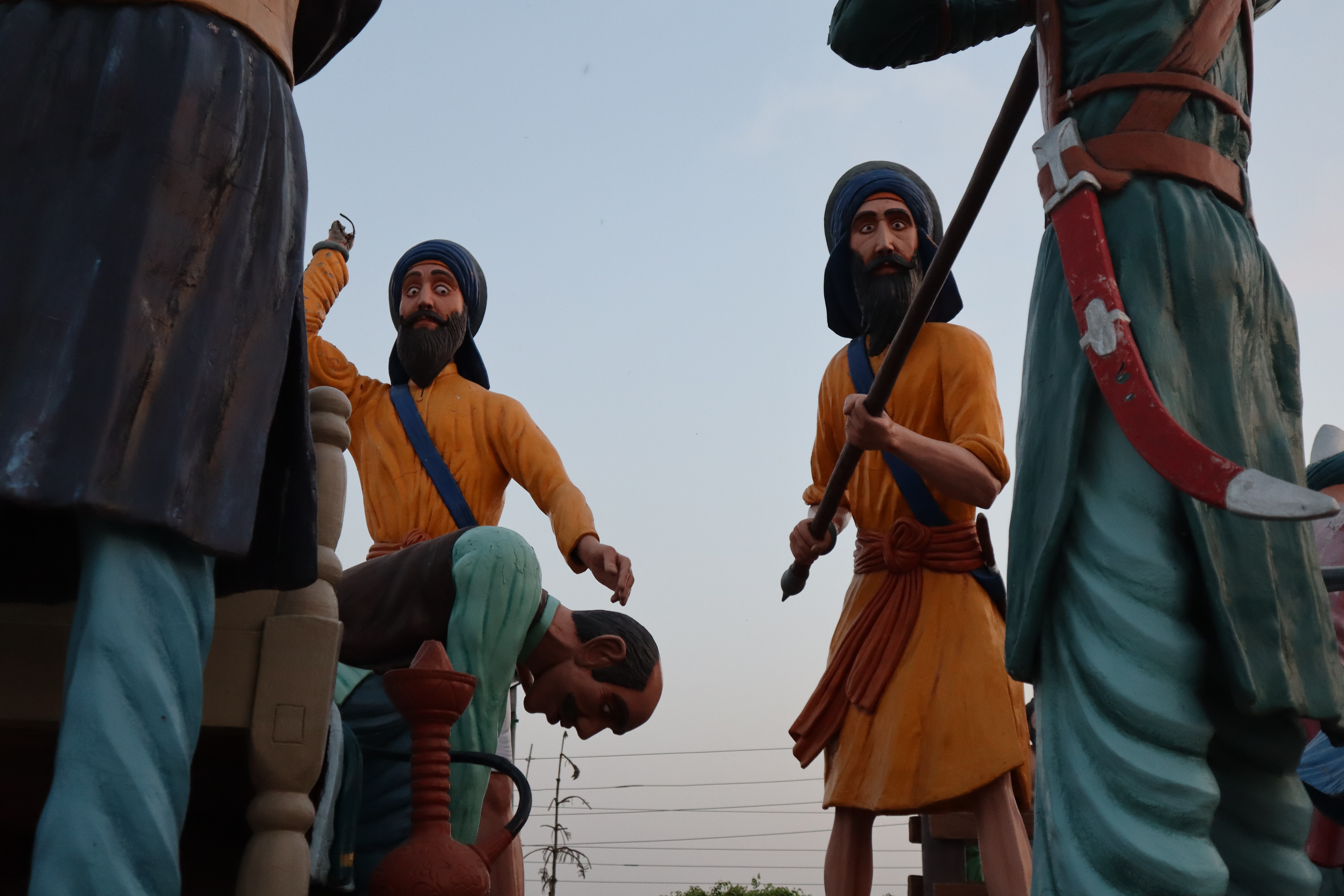
Diorama sculptural monument of Bhai Sukha Singh & Bhai Mehtab Singh assassinating Massa Ranghar during a Nautch dance at Gurdwara Shaheed Baba Tega Singh, Chand Purana, Bagha Purana tehsil, Moga district, Punjab, India, April 2023

On 11 August 1740 A.D. they dressed up as landlords from Patti and entered the city of Amritsar. They reached Harmandir Sahib and then tied their horses to the berry tree and went inside Harmandir Sahib carrying the bags. Massa Ranghar was smoking shisha and watching dancing girls. The Sikhs threw the bags under Massa's bed and said that they had come to pay the revenue. Massa bent downwards to have a look at the bags. Mehtab Singh immediately took his sword and slashed it at Massa's neck and instantly severed his head. Sukha Singh finished off the guards of Massa Ranghar. They put Massa's head in a bag and rode their horses back to Talwandi Sabo the same evening. The next day they reached Bikaner and presented Massa Ranghar's head on a spear to the congregation (Dal) of Sikhs.

== Death ==
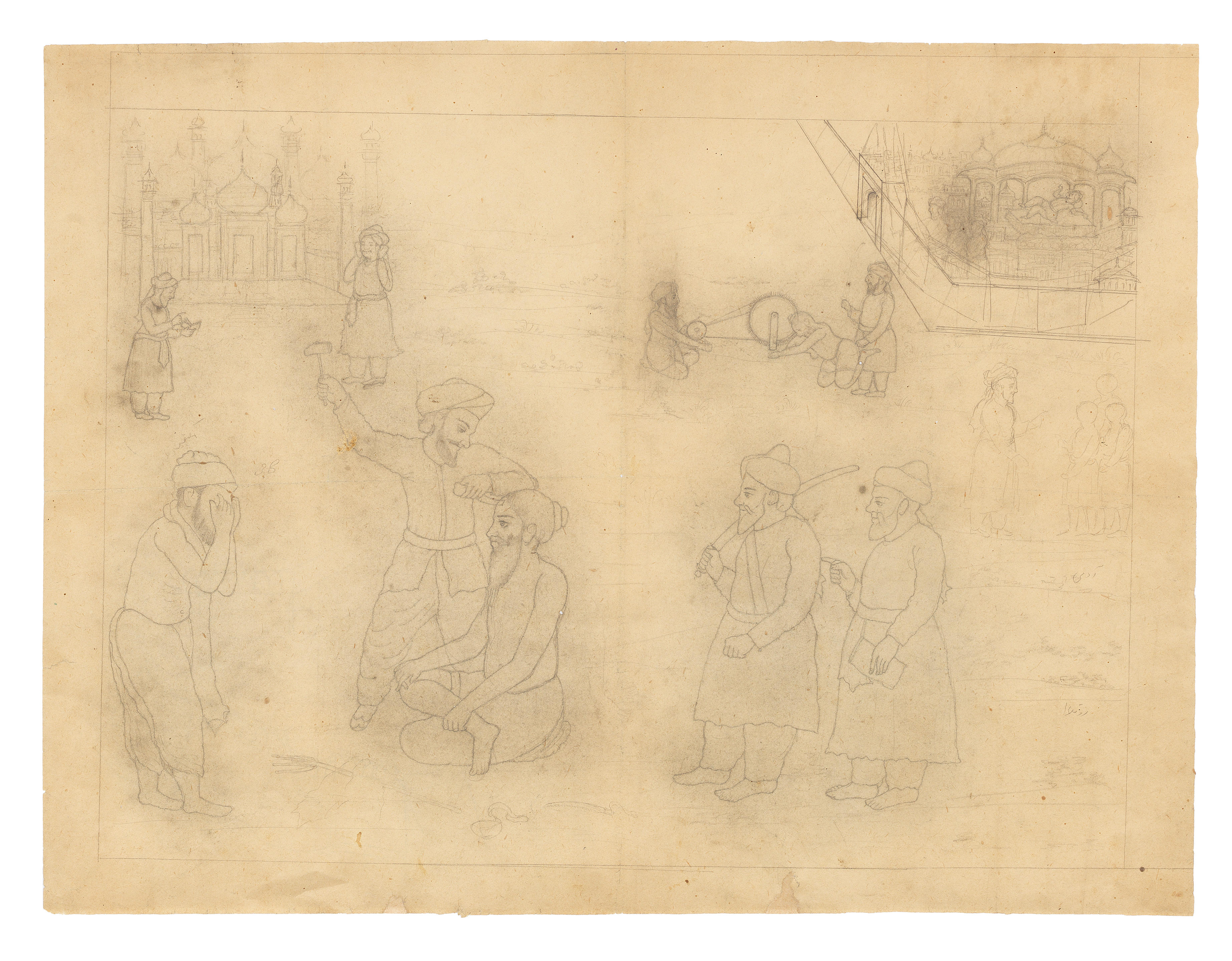
19th century drawing depicting the martyrdom of Taru Singh and Mehtab Singh Bhangu. Taru Singh is being scalped in the foreground whilst Mehtab Singh is being killed by a 'charkhari' (death wheel) in the background on the right-side.

In 1745, Mehtab Singh was captured by the Mughals after being pursued by them for five years after being given intel on his whereabouts by a spy named Harbhagat Niranjania. Bhangu was crushed to death on the spikes of wheel (charkhari) at Lahore in 1745 on the orders of Zakaria Khan. He was martyred alongside Taru Singh, who was scalped alive.

== Legacy ==
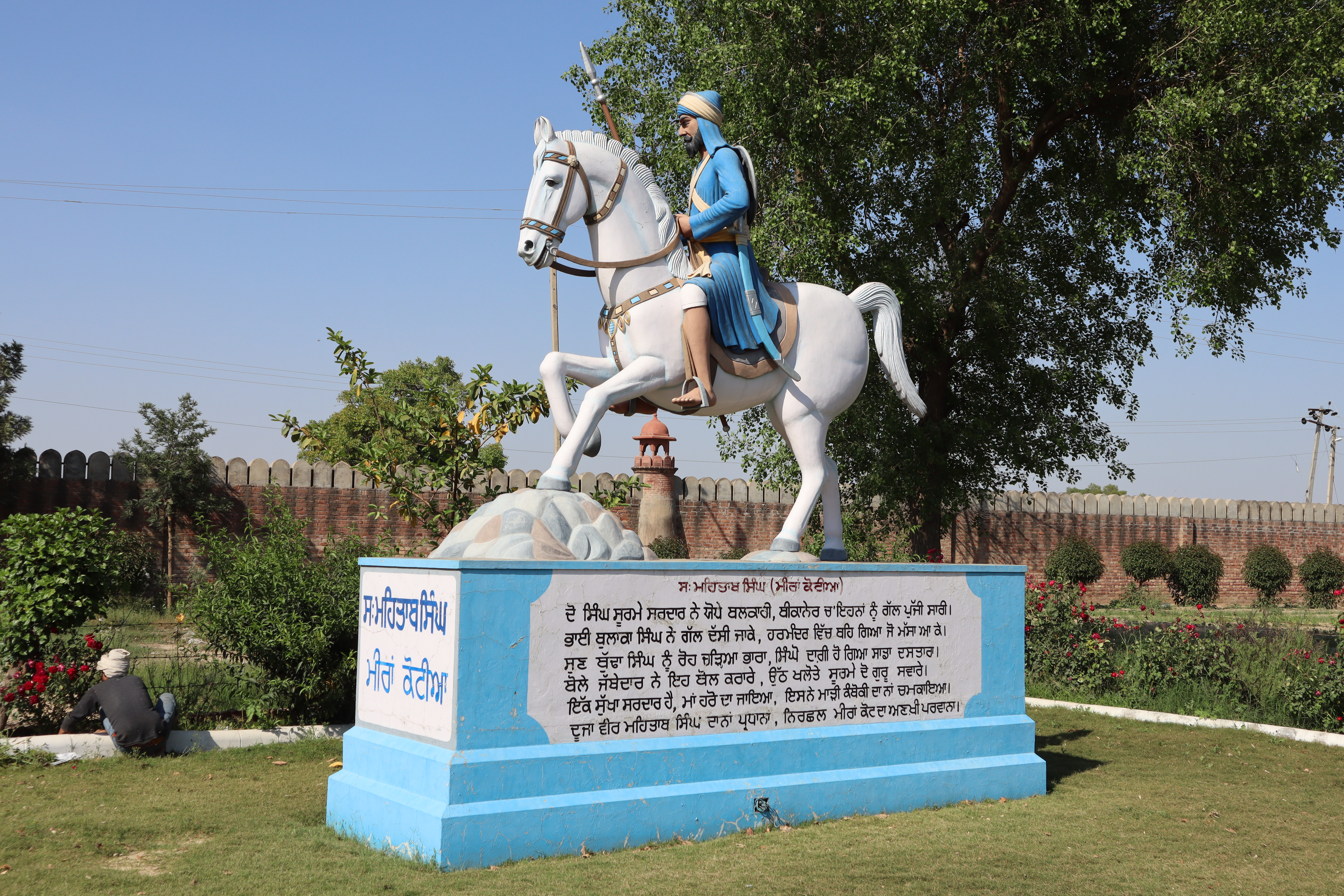
Equestrian statue of Mehtab Singh of Mirankot at Gurdwara Mehdiana Sahib, Mehdiana, Ludhiana district, Punjab, India, 9 April 2023

Rattan Singh Bhangu, author of the Sikh historiographical text 'Prachin Panth Parkash', was his grandson.

== See also ==
- Sukha Singh
- Rattan Singh Bhangu
- Udham Singh
- Massa Ranghar
