= Chhota Ghallughara =

1746 massacre of Sikhs by the Mughals

Chhota Ghalughara
- Part of Mughal–Sikh wars and Hill States–Sikh wars
- Native name: ਛੋਟਾ ਘੱਲੂਘਾਰਾ ("Lesser Massacre")
- Location: Across the Punjab (concentrated killings at Lahore, Amritsar, Kahnuwan, Parol, Kathua, Mandi, Kullu)
- Date: March – May 1746
- Deaths: 10,000 Sikh men, women, and children
- Victim: Sikhs
- Perpetrators: Mughal Empire and Hill States
- Assailants: Yahya Khan, Lakhpat Rai, Hill Rajas of the Shivalik Range

Chhota Ghallughara (Punjabi: ਛੋਟਾ ਘੱਲੂਘਾਰਾ [tʃʰoːʈäː kəl˨luːkäː˨ɾäː], "Smaller Massacre"), also known as the Nikka Ghallughara, was a significant massacre of the Sikh population by the Mughal Empire and Hill States in 1746 (1803 Sammat). The Mughal Army, headed by Yahya Khan, the Subahdar of Lahore, and Diwan Lakhpat Rai, killed an estimated 7,000 Sikhs in the mass killings while an additional 3,000 Sikhs were taken captive and later executed.

Chhōtā Ghallūghārā is distinguished from the Vaddā Ghallūghārā, the greater massacre of 1762. The Chhōṭā Ghallūghārā took place in 1746, much of the killings occurred in the Kahnuwan Chhamb (marshlands) near the Beas River in present-day Gurdaspur district. The killings lasted from March to May 1746. The killings first began in Lahore, with then focus being placed on the Sikhs in Amritsar, which led Sikh leaders to encamp in the Kahnuwan jungle for their followers' safety.

The immediate reason for the genocide was Lakhpat Rai, a revenue minister of the local Mughal administration, wanting revenge against the Sikhs in the aftermath of the death of his brother, Jaspat Rai, at Sikh hands. Lakhpat Rai had permission from the Mughal governor of Lahore province, Yahya Khan, to conduct the massacres.

== Background ==
=== Origins of Sikhism ===
Sikhism began in the days of Guru Nanak (1469–1539) and grew to be a distinctive social force, especially after the formation of the Order of Khalsa in 1699. Since the martyrdom of the fifth Sikh Guru, Guru Arjan Dev Ji in 1606, Sikhs have known the use of arms and the need of self-defense. The Khalsa was designated to oppose the tyranny of the Mughal Empire and any other form of injustice. Through much of the early eighteenth century, the Khalsa was outlawed by the government and survived in the safety of remote forests, deserts, and swamplands of the Punjab region and neighbouring Kashmir and Rajasthan.

=== Persecution of the Sikhs (1739–46) ===
Zakariya Khan Bahadur, the Governor of Lahore, offered lucrative rewards for the discovery and killing of Sikhs. A substantial monetary reward was offered for information on the whereabouts of a Sikh. A blanket was offered to anyone who managed to cut off the distinctive mane of a Sikh or Khalsa and a larger sum for the delivery of a Sikh skull. The plunder of Sikh homes was made lawful and anyone giving shelter to or withholding information about the movements of the Sikhs was liable to themselves being executed. Zakaria Khan's police scoured the countryside and brought back hundreds of Sikhs in chains. They were publicly executed at the horse market of Lahore, since renamed Shahidganj ("place of the martyred").

==== Bhai Bota Singh and Bhai Garja Singh ====
During the days of persecution, Bhai Bota Singh who lived in the forest would come out in search of food from sympathizers and occasionally would visit Amritsar by night and take a dip in the holy pool around Harimandir Sahib. One day he was noticed by some people who thought he was a Sikh but a member of their party objected saying he could not have been a Sikh, for had he been one, he would not have concealed himself so. Other versions of the story say that Mughal guards were passing the forest when one said that the Sikhs were all deceased and there were none left.

Vexed by the observer's remark, Bhai Bota Singh set on a plan whereby he and his companion Bhai Garja Singh took up a position on the main highway near Tarn Taran. There, they proclaimed the sovereignty of Khalsa and collected a small toll tax from each passerby. They also sent a notice with a traveller for the governor to get his attention. After seven days 1000 soldiers with 100 horsemen came to apprehend the two Sikhs who then died fighting.

==== The martydom of Mani Singh Shaheed ====
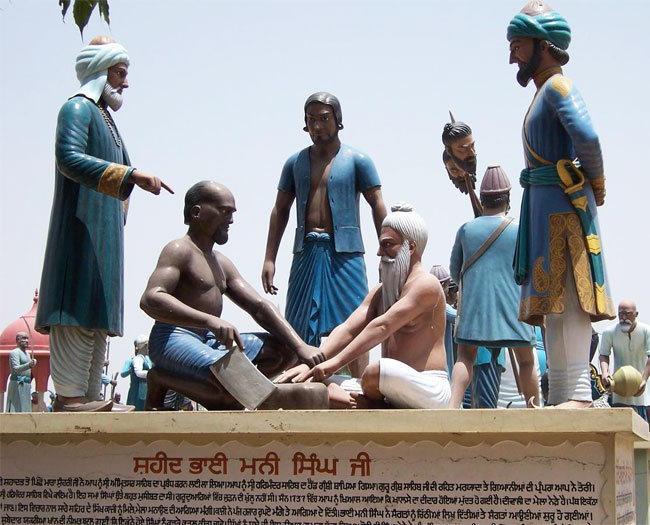
Bhai Mani Singh being tortured by dismemberment

Bhai Mani Singh was a prominent Sikh scholar and teacher who lived in the city of Amritsar, founded by Guru Ram Das. For many years, Sikhs had customarily gathered at Amritsar in the spring and fall for the holidays of Vaisakhi and Diwali. Under the persecution of the Mughals, these festivals had been disrupted.

Bhai Mani Singh sought and obtained Zakaria Khan's permission to hold the Diwali celebration in Amritsar on payment of a tax of 5000 rupees. When Mani Singh found out that the governor had dispatched a large number of soldiers to annihilate the Sikhs gathered at Amritsar, he sent word out to the Sikhs in their forest and desert hideouts, forbidding them from coming. In consequence, no money was collected and Bhai Mani Singh was prosecuted for not paying the stipulated sum. After a summary trial, he was given the choice of embracing Islam or facing death. Bhai Mani Singh chose the latter and as his punishment, was cut to pieces, joint by joint.

=== Darbar Sahib and Massa Ranghar ===
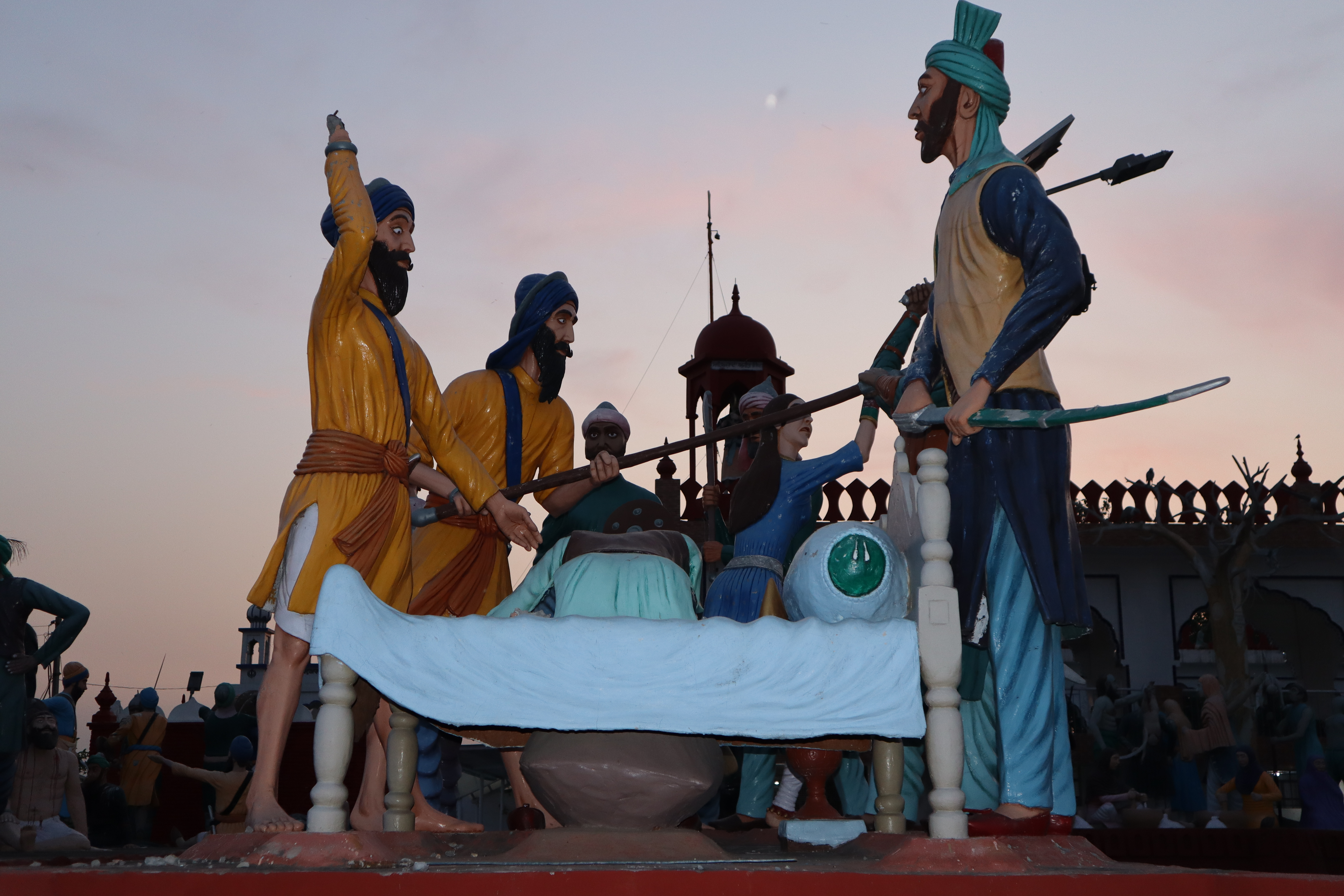
Diorama sculptural monument of Bhai Sukha Singh & Bhai Mehtab Singh assassinating Massa Ranghar during a Nautch dance at Gurdwara Shaheed Baba Tega Singh, Chand Purana, Bagha Purana tehsil, Moga district, Punjab, India, April 2023

To prevent the Sikhs from accessing the holy shrine "Darbar Sahib", or the "Golden Temple", at Amritsar a Mughal military officer named Massa Ranghar was stationed there. Massa Ranghar was physically strong, fit and tall. Ranghar not only occupied the holy place, but committed sacrilege by carousing with dancing girls and consuming meat and alcohol in the Sanctum Sanctorum situated in the midst of the sacred pool.

This offence continued until news of it reached an isolated band of Sikhs in Rajasthan. Of them, Mehtab Singh and Sukkha Singh set off to cross the distance to Amritsar. Finding the city strongly guarded, the two disguised themselves as revenue officials. In this guise, they entered the Harmandir Sahib, and decapitated Massa Ranghar and escaped before the Mughal soldiers could realise what had happened. This took place on 11 August 1740.

Sukkha Singh'a popularity soared among the Khalsa after this act and he eventually became the leader of a separate Jatha. Sukkha Singh was wounded in the defensive action involving the first Sikh massacre and later died in battle with the invading Afghan army of Ahmed Shah Durrani in 1752.

==== The martyrdom of Bhai Taru Singh ====
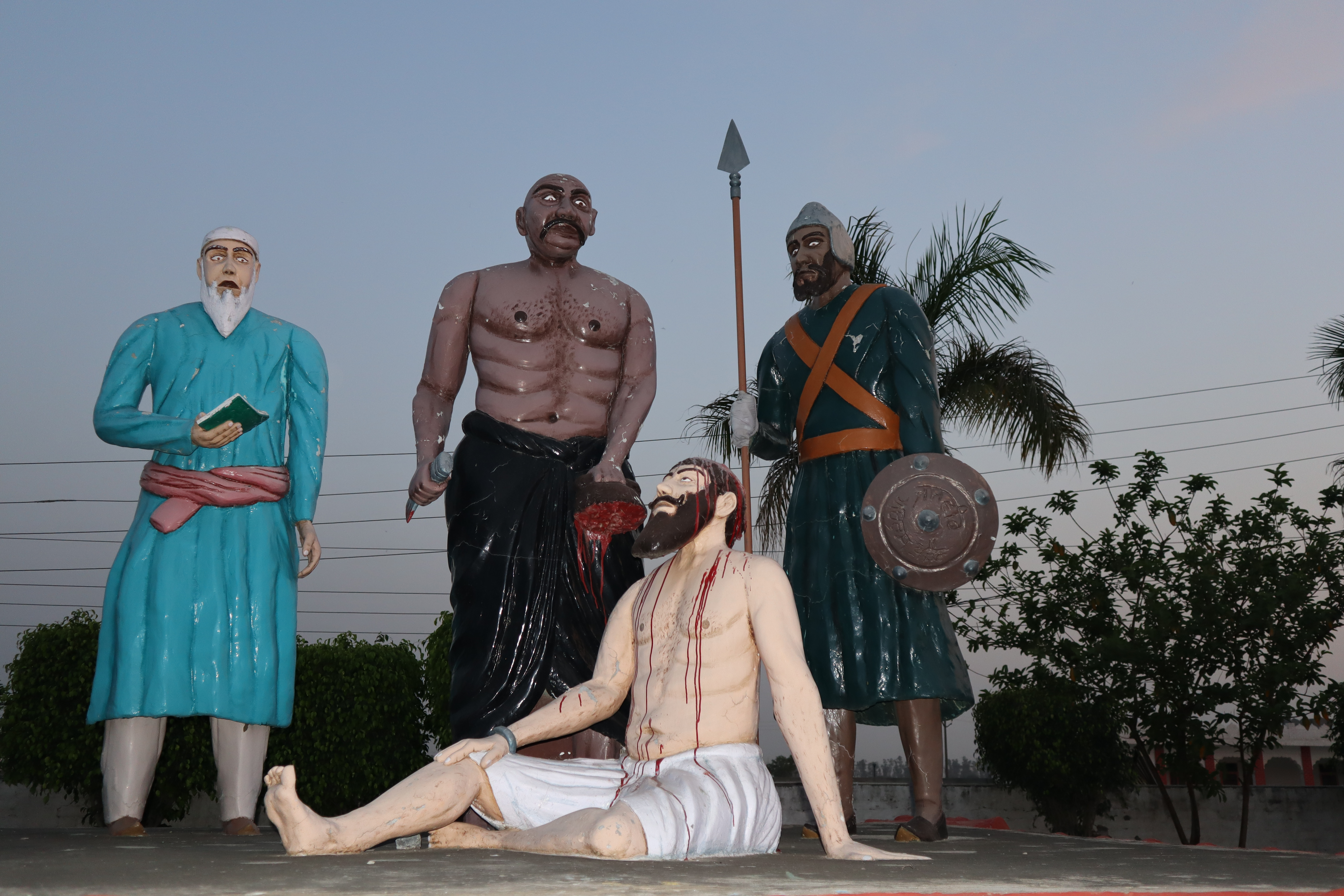
Diorama sculptural monument of the de-scalping of Bhai Taru Singh at Gurdwara Shaheed Baba Tega Singh Ji, Chand Purana, Bagha Purana tehsil, Moga district, Punjab, India, April 2023

Zakaria Khan, the governor of Lahore, experienced great frustration in his effort to decimate the Sikhs. He once asked his men, "From where do the Sikhs obtain their nourishment? I have debarred them from all occupations. They realize no taxes, they do not farm, nor are they allowed to do business or join public employment. I have stopped all offerings to their Gurdwaras. No provisions or supplies are accessible to them. Why do they not die of sheer starvation?"

An informant directed the governor to the village of Puhla where lived a 25-year-old Sikh named Taru Singh who according to the informant would supply food and resources to the Khalsa who were in the forest. Taru Singh's mother and sister both toil and grind grain to make a living, together they earned little but sent what they got.

On hearing this the governor sent a detachment of soldiers to Bhai Taru Singh's village to arrest him and bring him to the provincial capital of Lahore. The year was 1745. When the Sikh heard of their approach, he came out of the village wishing to spare his village any sort of hardship and surrendered to the governor's men. When he refused to convert, his distinctive long hair was scraped from his scalp and the young Sikh left to die. Afterwards Taru Singh was given over to a Sikh family who tended to him for his remaining days.

== The massacre of 1746 ==
=== Lead-up to the massacre ===
In 1721, Zakariya Khan was appointed governor of Lahore by the Mughal court and embarked on a campaign to eradicate the Sikhs. In 1737, Bhai Mani Singh was executed by the Mughal administration after the Mughals demanded the Sikhs pay a 5,000 rupee tax and Mani Singh warned Sikhs about a planned killing of Sikhs if they gathered at Amritsar during Diwali that year. In 1739, hundred of Sikhs were rounded-up and executed at Lahore at a horse-market that later became known as Shahidganj. Furthermore, anyone caught helping Sikhs would be punished and those who cut the hair of Sikhs, provided a Sikh head, or gave intel on Sikhs were rewarded. In July 1739, Bhai Bota Singh and Bhai Garja Singh defied Mughal authority and a force was sent to exterminate them. The next year in 1740, the Darbar Sahib in Amritsar was not able to be accessed by the Sikhs for worship-purposes and a Mughal official named Massa Ranghar had turned the sacred site into a place of his leisure and entertainment. In-response to this perceived offence, two Sikhs named Sukha Singh and Mehtab Singh infiltred the shrine complex and assassinated Massa. In 1745, Zakaria Khan sent a force to Phula village to arrest Bhai Taru Singh, as he had been providing assistance to Sikhs. Bhai Taru Singh was subsequently executed at Lahore. In the same year in 1745, Zakaria Khan died and was succeeded as subahdar of Lahore province by his son Yahya Khan, who continued his father's anti-Sikh persecution. Zakaria Khan had appointed two brothers from the village of Kalanaur (Gurdaspur), Lakhpat Rai and Jaspat Rai, as the Diwan of Lahore and the Faujdar (military commander) of Eminabad, respectively.

==== Death of Jaspat Rai ====
Early in that year, Sukha Singh joined hands with Sardar Jassa Singh Ahluwalia who was the supreme leader of the Dal Khalsa pushing towards the Eminabad territory of Gujranwala district. Jaspat Rai, the local faujdar was killed in an encounter with the roving band of Sikhs. When news reached Diwan Lakhpat Rai that a group (jatha) of Sikhs had arrived at Gurdwara Rori Sahib, Eminabad near Eminabad, he sent his brother, Jaspat Rai, with an army to drive them away. In the ensuing skirmish, Jaspat Rai was killed by a Sikh named Nibahu Singh.

=== Killings begin in Lahore and Amritsar ===
Jaspat's brother, Lakhpat Rai, who was a dewan (revenue minister) at Lahore, vowed his revenge. Lakhpat Rai removed his turban in Yahiya Khan's court and swore that he would not wear it again until he had wiped out every Sikh. With the help of the new governor, Yahiya Khan, Lakhpat Rai mobilised the Lahore troops, summoned reinforcements, gathered auxiliary reinforcements from across the country, alerted the dependent rulers of the kingdoms in the Himalayan foothills, and roused the population for a massacre of the "infidel" Sikhs. The Sikh inhabitants of Lahore were first rounded up, then executed on 10 March 1746. Hundreds of Sikhs living in Lahore were rounded up and executed. Lakhpat Rai went so far as to fill the holy sarovar at Golden temple with sand. The reading of gurbani (Sikh hymns) was also banned by Lakhpat Rai. Diwan Kaura Mall tried to stop Lakhpat Rai to no success. After Lahore, Lakhpat Rai set his eyes on the Sikh population of Amritsar.

=== Sikh retreat to the jungles of Kahnuwan and subsequent killings ===
In the face of these ongoing campaigns against Sikhs, prominent Sikh figures, such as Baba Deep Singh, Nawab Kapur Singh, and Sardar Jassa Singh Ahluwalia ordered the community to gather in the dense marshlands of Kahnuwan. Thousands of Sikhs, led by various jathas (bands) including those of Gurdial Singh Dallewalia, Hari Singh Bhangi, Bhai Sukha Singh Mari Kamboke, and Naudh Singh, took refuge there with their followers. Historians estimate the number of Sikhs in the marsh to be between 15,000 and 40,000. Harinder Singh estimates that the Mughal army that surrounded them in the jungle was 50,000-strong and consisted of both cavalry and infantry. The Kahnuwan marsh was roughly 20–25 miles long and 5–6 miles wide. Upon discovering their location, Yahiya Khan and Lakhpat Rai besieged the area with their armies. The jungles in the area were a dense thicket and reed-covered.

Lakhpat Rai next set out for the swampy forest of Kahnuwan, near the town of Gurdaspur, about 130 kilometres (81 mi) to the north-east of Lahore, where Sikhs were reported to have concentrated. Lakhpat had with him with a large force of mostly cavalry, supported by cannons, with which he surrounded the forest and began a systematic search for the Sikhs. The Mughal forces cut paths through the jungle to create routes for their troops and artillery. 10 March 1746, a large number of Sikhs were massacred by Mughals and their allies when the Sikhs were encamped in the jungle-swamps of Kahnuwan. The Mughal forces initially used artillery against the Sikhs in the jungles but this was ineffective so they eventually resorted to setting the jungle on-fire. After a battle, the Mughal forces eventually set the forest on fire on 30 May 1746 to drive the Sikh hold-outs out of their jungle hiding. The Sikh forces were unable to repel the Mughals due to limited food and water provisions, depleting ammunition, exhaustion from the prolonged conflict, and being outnumbered. To escape, the Sikhs faced a difficult predicament as they had a steep mountains in the front of them, the Ravi River to their right, and the pursuing army behind them. The Sikhs retreated toward Parol and Kathua.

=== Retreat to the hills ===
The Sikhs held out for some time and struck back whenever they could. Heavily outnumbered and under-equipped, they decided to escape to the foothills of the Himalayas to the north. Many Sikhs were killed while they trekked on the mountains. Due to limited supplies, some of their weakened horses stumbled and fell into the mountain ravines and gorges. The Sikhs attempted an escape to the Basohli Hills. The Sikhs crossed the River Ravi and came in sight of the foothills, a 65-kilometre (40 mi) trek with the enemy in pursuit, only to find the armies of the hill rajas arrayed to oppose them. The Sikhs had assumed that the Hindu population of the hills would support them, which was not the case, leading to many deaths. The Hill State forces and tribes were antagonistic to the Sikhs on Yahya Khan's orders, shooting bullets and throwing stones at them. Some Sikhs were captured at Parol and jailed at Basohli. Caught between these two armies and running out of food, the Sikhs suffered heavy casualties. The Sikhs decided to turn-around and head back toward the Majha region but they had to cross the Ravi, which had flooded. Two brothers of Gurdial Singh attempted to test-cross the flooded Ravi River but were swept away and disappeared. Therefore, it was decided that the Sikhs on-foot should head into the mountains whilst the Sikhs that were mounted would fight toward the plains. Many of those Sikhs who went toward the mountains managed to survive the Pahari opposition for six months in various parts of the Mandi and Kullu regions before eventually reaching the Sikh stronghold of Kiratpur Sahib for safety. The mounted Sikhs, whom were encircled by their enemy in a forest, attempted to force a break away by forming a body to combat their opponent straight-on, being led by Sukha Singh. Sukha Singh's group had around 2,000–3,000 survivors but few horses. In the fight between Sukha Singh's forces and the Mughals, the Mughals lost Harbhaj Rai, Nahar Khan, the Faujdar Karam Bakhsh Rasoolnagria, and Makhmur Khan, whilst Sukha Singh sustained a leg injury. Some local villagers were recruited by the Mughals to join the fight but these new recruits were easily defeatable for the Sikhs in-comparison to the professional soldiers, thus the Sikhs were able to take their horses and weapons on 1 June 1746.

=== Sikh break through Mughal encirclement and escape to Malwa ===
At last, they managed to break through the encirclement and to recross the River Ravi in a desperate attempt to reach the safety of the Lakhi Jungle, near Bathinda, some 240 kilometres (150 mi) to the south. In the river crossing, many of the weakened Sikhs were swept away by the current. Around 2,000 Sikh survivors managed to cross the Ravi on-horseback and by makeshift rafts to enter the Riarki region of Gurdaspur. With Lakhpat Rai's forces still in hot pursuit, they crossed two more rivers, the Beas and Sutlej, before finally arriving at the sanctuary of the Lakhi Jungle. The surviving Sikhs crossed the Beas River near Sri Hargobindpur during the high heat of the month of Jeth (May/June in the Gregorian calendar) and the heated sands. Due to their scortched skin touching the hot sand, they became unable to walk and re-purposed torn strips from their remaining clothing into bandages to wrap their feet in. Their dhal shields were heated in the sand as hot-plates to bake rotis. While the remaining Sikhs were camped near Yahyapur, a group of local Pathans attacked them and they learned that Lakhpat Rai's forces were attempting to cross the river to pursue them so they left for the Sutlej River. They clashed with the forces of Adina Beg but successfully crossed the Sutlej River at Aliwal to enter into the Malwa region, eventually dispersing into various villages. Lakhpat Rai's forced decided to not pursue the remaining Sikhs further into Malwa and returned to Lahore.

=== Torture and execution of captured Sikhs at Lahore ===
An estimated 7,000 Sikhs were killed and 3,000 captured during this operation. The captives were marched back to Lahore, paraded in the streets and publicly beheaded. For months, they were held and paraded atop of donkeys in Lahore. The captured Sikhs were ultimately killed specifically at Nakhas Chowk in Lahore. The heads of thousands of Sikhs were carried on carts and hung at the gates of Lahore as trophies. Minarets were constructed out of piles of dismembered Sikh heads and their decapidated and mangled bodies were buried within the walls of a mosque.

== Estimate of total Sikh dead ==
Most estimates of the number of Sikh deaths from the massacre range from 7,000 to 11,000. A popular estimate is a figure of 7,000 Sikhs being killed at-site and an additional 3,000 were captured whom were later executed, with around 10,000 dead in-total. Sulakhan Sarhaddi in the book Agan Gatha Dastan Chhota Ghallughara cites 15,000 Sikhs were killed. Harinder Singh of the Sikh Research Institute estimates between 10,000 and 15,000 Sikhs were killed in the incident. Given the small numbers of the Sikhs in those days of persecution, the losses will have been a very substantial proportion of their population. The Mughals also faced losses during the conflict. Purnima Dhavan states that around 400 Sikhs were killed in the massacre, a much smaller figure than other guesstimates. The traditional account of Rattan Singh Bhangu claims 40,000 Sikhs were killed and 6,000–7,000 survived the onslaught, with Bhangu also claiming 40,000–50,000 Mughals being killed.

== Aftermath ==
The Chhota Ghallughara was the largest killing of Sikhs in their history up until that point. During the campaign, Harbhaj Rai (Lakhpat Rai's son) and Nahar Khan (Yahiya Khan's son) were killed, the faujdar Karam Baksh and several other commanders were also killed by the Sikhs. Lakhpat Rai went on to order Sikh places of worship destroyed and their scriptures burnt. He went so far as to decree that anyone uttering the word "Guru" be put to death and even saying the Punjabi word for sugar, "gur", which sounded like "Guru", could be cause for the death penalty.

In the aftermath of the massacre, on Vaisakhi 1747, the Sarbat Khalsa passed a Gurmata injunction for a fortress called Ram Rauni to be built at Amritsar. Furthermore, a gurmata commanded that the sixty-five groupings of the Sikhs be streamlined into eleven groups (misls) under the leadership of Jassa Singh Ahluwalia. By 1765, the Sikhs had conquered Lahore.

== Historiography ==
Much of the information about the genocide originates from Rattan Singh Bhangu's 19th century work, Panth Prakash. Rattan Singh consulted a few eyewitnesses to record his narration of the massacre, specifically his father, maternal grandfather, two uncles, Sukha Singh, and perhaps some others who had participated in the battles. Within Bhangu's work Panth Prakash, the tale of the genocide is told in the episode in the work titled Sakhi Ghallughare ki ("Eye-witness account of Ghallughara"). In his work, Bhangu refers to the enemy as Turks whilst the Sikhs are referred to as Singhs.

== Legacy ==
A memorial for the massacre was in-augurated in Kahnuwan, Gurdaspur district, Punjab, India in 2011 by Parkash Singh Badal. A gurdwara dedicated to the event can also be found in Kahnuwan, named Gurdwara Chhota Ghallughara Sahib. At the site, a Ber tree marks the location where Nawab Kapur Singh strategized the battle of the massacre. A Nishan-e-Khalsa Academy has also been constructed in the area. A painting depicting the massacre was made by Master Gurdit Singh in 1966.

== See also ==
- Vadda Ghalughara
- Jallianwala Bagh massacre
- Patharighat massacre
- List of massacres in India
