= Ala Singh's war against Bhattis =

Ala Singh's war with the Bhattis
- Part of Mughal-Sikh wars
Date	1755–1758
Location	Cis-Sutlej territory, modern day Punjab and Haryana
Result	Victory of Ala Singh and the Dal Khalsa
Territorial changes	Budhlada, Boha, Tohana, Jamalpur, Dharsul and Kheri annexed by Ala Singh; Sunam and Samana also passed into Phulkian possession by the end of 1758

Belligerents
Patiala Kingdom; Dal Khalsa	Bhatti Chieftains; Faujdari of Hisar; Durranis of Sirhind

Commanders and leaders
Ala Singh; Bhai Gurbaksh Singh; Kanwar Lal Singh; Deep Singh Shahid	Muhammad Amin Khan Bhatti; Inayat Khan †; Walayat Khan †; Muhammad Hasan Khan Bhatti; Abdul Samad Khan Muhammadzai; Nawab Nasir Khan †

Strength
10,000 Dal Khalsa troops 2,000 men of Ala Singh	About 20,000 Rohillas, Bhattis and Pachadas

Casualties and losses
About 2,500 killed	About 16,000 killed

Ala Singh's war against the Bhattis was a series of conflicts in the mid-1750s between Ala Singh and the Bhatti chiefs of Budhlada, Rania, Bhatner and neighbouring areas of the Cis-Satluj region. The conflict followed the weakening of Lahore authority after the death of Mir Mannu in 1753 and the renewed activity of Sikh forces in the region. Ala Singh relied on support from the Dal Khalsa against Bhatti chiefs who had raided his settlements and opposed his expansion south of the Sutlej.

The war began with the Sikh attack on Budhlada in 1754, where Inayat Khan, Walayat Khan were killed. Budhlada, Boha, Tohana and Jamalpur then passed under Ala Singh's control. Muhammad Amin Khan Bhatti later obtained support from the faujdar of Hisar, but was defeated at Khudal, near Akalgarh.

The final phase took place in 1757, after Muhammad Amin Khan allied with Abdul Samad Khan, the Afghan governor of Sirhind. Their forces were defeated around Rampura and Dharsul after Nawab Nasir Khan of Hisar was killed and Ala Singh attacked the Bhatti camp at night. The victory ended the immediate Bhatti advance and added Jamalpur, Dharsul, Kheri and other villages to Ala Singh's possessions.

== Background ==
The death of Mir Mannu in November 1753 ended a period of intense pressure on the Sikhs in the Lahore province. The government that followed under Mughlani Begum and her infant son was weaker, and Sikh Misls that had withdrawn to hills and jungles during Mir Mannu's rule began to reappear. In 1754 Sikh forces sacked Sirhind. Afterward, the Sikh dals moved to Thikriwala near Barnala, where Ala Singh and Bhai Gurbaksh Singh received them.

The Bhattis were Rajputs who had converted to Islam during the Sultanate period. Their main country was protected by forts at Sirsa, Bhatner, Abohar and Bhatinda, and Bhatti chieftains also held positions in the Cis-Satluj region. Ala Singh used his connection with the Dal Khalsa to offset Bhatti military strength. With Sikh support he captured Samana, about 25 km south of Patiala, from Farid Khan Bhatti.

== Battle of Budhlada (1754) ==
The Bhatti chiefs Inayat Khan and Walayat Khan of Budhlada raided Ala Singh's territory. Prominent inhabitants of Longowal, including Bigha Mal, Daulata and Hari Chand, asked Ala Singh to protect his settlements from the Bhatti incursions. Ala Singh decided to act when the Dal Khalsa was present in the area.

Bhai Gurbaksh Singh marched against Budhlada with 10,000 men from the Dal Khalsa and 2,000 of Ala Singh's men. The defenders sought help from Muhammad Amin Khan of Bhatner, but no assistance arrived. After two days of minor skirmishing, the defenders came out of the fort and fought the besiegers. The Bhattis were defeated while Inayat Khan, Walayat Khan and 700 of their men were killed, while 500 Sikhs were killed. Budhlada and Boha then passed into Ala Singh's hands.

Ala Singh later granted Budhlada and Boha to Bhai Gurbaksh Singh. Their conquest encouraged further expansion into Tohana and Jamalpur.

=== Continued expansion ===
Before Ala Singh's expansion, Tohana was a pargana headquarters under Mir Ashad Ali Khan Baloch. Jamalpur was another pargana headquarters under the brothers Shams-ul-Din and Hassan Ullah. Both parganas were under the ultimate authority of Nawab Kamgar of Farrukhnagar, whose agent Bahadur Khan collected tribute there until 1751.

After Budhlada and Boha were taken, Bhai Gurbaksh Singh led the Dal Khalsa toward Tohana and Jamalpur. The inhabitants of Jamalpur, fearing Sikh incursions, had asked Muhammad Amin Khan Bhatti of Bhatner for protection, and he had stationed troops there. The force placed there was unable to resist the Sikhs. Tribute was exacted, and Tohana and Jamalpur were annexed to Ala Singh's territory.

== Battle of Khudal (1755) ==
The deaths of Inayat Khan and Walayat Khan, together with the loss of Budhlada, Boha, Tohana and Jamalpur, led Muhammad Amin Khan to renew the struggle against Ala Singh. Ala Singh and his son, Kanwar Lal Singh, extended their raids in the same time, overrunning Sohana, Jamalpur, Dharsul and Shikarpur, which belonged to Muhammad Amin Khan and Muhammad Hasan Khan Bhatti.

Muhammad Amin Khan secured assistance from the faujdar of Hisar and advanced with a large army toward Munak. Ala Singh marched out from Munak to meet the Bhatti-Hisar force before it entered his territory. The two armies met at Khudal, also rendered Khodal, near Akalgarh and midway between Budhlada and Munak.

The battle ended in the defeat of Muhammad Amin Khan and the detachment sent from Hisar. Muhammad Amin Khan fled with heavy losses. Ala Singh gained a large tract after the victory, including Bahadurpur, Khudal, Akbarpur, Sheikhpur Khudal, Jalura, Bareta and Mander.

Khudal was the first major contest between Ala Singh and the combined Bhatti-Hisar forces. After the defeat, Muhammad Amin Khan began seeking stronger allies against Ala Singh.

== Political changes in the Cis-Satluj region ==
Between 1755 and 1758, the territory south of the Sutlej experienced repeated changes of authority. In 1755 Qutab Shah, the tax collector of Saharanpur district, invaded the region and defeated Sadiq Beg, the faujdar of Sirhind. Sadiq Beg took refuge with Adina Beg, the faujdar of the Jalandhar Doab. Qutab Shah then crossed the Sutlej and invaded the Jalandhar Doab, but Adina Beg defeated him in a defensive campaign. Jamal Khan of Malerkotla was killed while supporting Qutab Shah. After this victory, Adina Beg influenced Sirhind territory as far as Thanesar, Mustafabad, Kohram and Mansurpur.

Ala Singh remained neutral during the struggle between Adina Beg and Qutab Shah, avoiding devastation in his own territory. Adina Beg's influence in the Cis-Satluj region was short-lived. In 1756 Ahmad Shah Durrani invaded Punjab again and annexed the Punjab and Sirhind territories. Timur Shah was appointed governor of Lahore, Jahan Khan was made his wazir, and Abdul Samad Khan Muhammadzai of Hashtnagar near Peshawar was appointed governor of Sirhind.

Muhammad Amin Khan, still affected by his defeat at Khudal and by Ala Singh's gains against the Bhattis, strengthened his relations with the new Sirhind governor. He gave his daughter in marriage to Abdul Samad Khan and persuaded him to act against Ala Singh.

== Conflict with Abdul Samad Khan ==
The immediate cause of hostilities with Abdul Samad Khan was the flight of Lachhami Narain, Abdul Samad Khan's diwan. After quarrelling with his master, Lachhami Narain fled to Sanaur and took shelter with Gurbaksh Singh Kaleke, an officer of Ala Singh. Abdul Samad Khan marched to punish Ala Singh for protecting him.

Ala Singh moved his forces to Sanaur. Lachhami Narain was shifted from Sanaur to Patiala, and Ala Singh then moved to the fort of Dodan because the mud fort of Patiala was considered insecure. Abdul Samad Khan besieged Dodan, but the defenders sallied out and drove back the besiegers. Fighting continued for some time.

Adina Beg Khan then invited the Marathas to invade Sirhind. Abdul Samad Khan retired to his headquarters when he received news of the Maratha advance. The Marathas later sacked Sirhind and took Abdul Samad Khan prisoner to Lahore. Abdul Samad Khan escaped from the Maratha camp and joined Muhammad Amin Khan.

== Bhatti attempts to secure outside support ==
While Abdul Samad Khan was engaged against Ala Singh, Muhammad Amin Khan tried to obtain the support of Prince Ali Gohar. Ali Gohar visited the Baloch settlement at Jhajjar and later advanced toward Hisar. Muhammad Amin Khan met him there, but the prince was being pursued by the wazir Imad-ul-Mulk and withdrew toward Rewari and Delhi.

Imad-ul-Mulk then led Mughal forces into Muhammad Amin Khan's territory because the Bhatti chief had supported Ali Gohar. Muhammad Amin Khan fortified himself in Bhatner. The Mughal forces besieged the fort, but their camp suffered from shortages of food and water, while the Bhattis made repeated sorties and plundered men who left the camp.

Ala Singh supported the Mughal forces by supplying food. This assistance countered Muhammad Amin Khan's attempted alliance with Ali Gohar and kept the Mughal army away from Ala Singh's own territory. Imad-ul-Mulk and Emperor Alamgir II later returned to Delhi.

== Battle of Rampura (1757) ==
After Abdul Samad Khan escaped from the Maratha camp and joined Muhammad Amin Khan, the Bhatti campaign against Ala Singh resumed. Muhammad Amin Khan gathered about 20,000 Rohillas, Bhattis and Pachadas. The army moved from Fatehabad, captured Jamalpur and ravaged the outskirts of Tohana. Ala Singh marched from Munak to meet the invading force before it advanced farther into his territory.

The armies met in the Akalgarh area, with the fighting centred around Rampura and Dharsul. The first two days passed in minor skirmishes. The wider engagement lasted several days, during which the Bhattis were supported by Mughal troops from Hisar.

Nawab Nasir Khan, the governor of Hisar, was killed during the fighting. His death caused the Mughal troops to leave the field. Ala Singh then attacked the Bhatti camp at night. The attack broke the Bhatti position, and Muhammad Amin Khan and Abdul Samad Khan were defeated with heavy losses in men and material. Muhammad Amin Khan escaped to Hisar.

The battle took place in 1757 and ended the immediate Bhatti advance against Ala Singh's territory.

== Aftermath ==
The defeat at Rampura ended Bhatti encroachment on Ala Singh's territory. The fighting also resolved a dispute in Jamalpur, where one group of zamindars had favoured Ala Singh and another, led by Ramzan Ullah Khan Sheikh, had favoured Muhammad Amin Khan. After the battle, Ala Singh's control was established over Jamalpur and its neighbouring villages.

Ala Singh annexed the tappas of Dharsul and Kheri, each consisting of sixteen villages, and placed them under Hira Singh and Beka Singh Sekhon. He also conquered Narwana Kalwan, Dharaundi, Belrakhan, Kharl, Peepal Theh, Nanaudhi and Batumra. He extended the fort of Dharsul and repaired the fort of Shakarpura to consolidate the new possessions.

The battle enabled Ala Singh to occupy Sunam fort, giving him a stronger fortified base than the mud forts he had previously used. By the end of 1758, Sunam and Samana had also passed into his possession. At the end of 1760, Ala Singh held 726 villages, including many towns.

After the victory, Ala Singh honoured Deep Singh Shahid, the leader of the Dal Khalsa near Damdama, by taking pahul from him a second time.

== Bibliography ==
- Gupta, Hari Ram (1978). History of the Sikhs: The Sikh Commonwealth or Rise and Fall of Sikh Misls. History of the Sikhs. Vol. 4 (3rd, illustrated ed.). Munshiram Manoharlal Publishers. ISBN 9788121501651.
- Singh, Harbans; Barrier, Norman Gerald (1976). Punjab Past and Present: Essays in Honour of Dr. Ganda Singh. Punjabi University. ISBN 9780883869406.
- Singh, Bhagata (1993). A History of the Sikh Misals. Patiala: Publication Bureau, Punjabi University.
- Singh, Ganda (1985). The Panjab Past and Present. Vol. 19. Patiala: Department of Punjab Historical Studies, Punjabi University.
- Dilagīra, Harajindara Siṅgha (2007). Sikkha tawārīkha de ghallughāre, 1716–1765. Sikkha Yūnīwarasiṭī Praisa. ISBN 9782930247236.
- Singh, Kirpal (1954). Life of Maharaja Ala Singh of Patiala and His Times: Based on Contemporary and Original Sources. Sikh History Research Department, Khalsa College.
