= Moin-ul-Mulk's campaign against Sikhs =

Mughal-Sikh military conflict (c.1748–53)

Moin-ul-Mulk's campaign against the Sikhs
- Illustration of Sikh women and children toiling away grinding flour at Mir Mannu's death camp, by Gian Singh Naqqash, ca.1930
Date	April 1748 – 3 November 1753
Location	Punjab region (including Lahore, Amritsar, Jullundur Doab, and adjacent hill tracts)
Result	Sikh victory

Belligerents
Lahore Subah	Sikh confederacy

Commanders and leaders
Moin-ul-Mulk †; Lakhpat Rai (POW); Jaspat Rai †; Adina Beg Khan; Sadiq Beg Khan	Nawab Kapur Singh #; Jassa Singh Ahluwalia; Charat Singh Sukerchakia

Strength
Unknown	Unknown

Casualties and losses
Unknown	Unknown

Moin-ul-Mulk's campaign against the Sikhs was a series of operations in the Punjab region (1748–1753) conducted under the provincial government at Lahore led by Moin-ul-Mulk (also known as Mir Mannu). The campaign aimed to curb Sikh armed activity that had expanded during a period of political instability in the province and repeated Afghan invasions. The offensive combined field expeditions, sieges, and measures directed at Sikh settlements and families, but it did not eliminate Sikh activity before Moin-ul-Mulk's death in 1753.

== Background ==
The execution of Banda Singh Bahadur in 1716 ended the Sikh Rebellion against the Mughal Empire. Afterwards the Punjab province was successively administered by Abd al-Samad Khan, Zakariya Khan, Yahya Khan, Shahnawaz Khan and Moin-ul-Mulk. Sikh groups reorganized in the countryside and continued armed activity despite sustained campaigns against them.

After the death of Zakariya Khan in 1745, a succession dispute and civil conflict weakened provincial authority in the Punjab. During the same period, Sikh armed groups increased raids and mobility in the countryside, benefiting from the limited reach of the Lahore administration outside major towns and roads.

In 1748, Lahore was occupied during Abdali's first invasion, and fighting near Sirhind contributed to the provincial reorganization that followed. The same period saw the Lahore government attempt punitive operations against Sikh bands while also relying on local intermediaries in the Doab and hill tracts, where Sikh influence had grown.

== Appointment of Moin-ul-Mulk ==
In the immediate aftermath of the Mughal victory at the Battle of Manupur (11 March 1748), the imperial army halted on the Sutlej while arrangements were made at the centre. Prince Ahmad, son of Emperor Muhammad Shah, and Moin-ul-Mulk (Mir Mannu) remained at Sirhind until 11 April 1748. After Muhammad Shah recalled the prince to Delhi, Muin-ul-Mulk was appointed subahdar (governor) of the Punjab (Lahore subah) on 11 April 1748, and Prince Ahmad returned to the capital.

Moin-ul-Mulk proceeded to Lahore to take charge of the province and began reconstituting the administration after the disruptions of factional conflict in the Punjab and the recent Durrani invasion. Soon after entering Lahore, he ordered the arrest of Jalley Khan and Diwan Lakhpat Rai, officials associated with the preceding Afghan regime, and imposed a fine on Lakhpat Rai, Kaura Mal was appointed as his deputy (naib) and diwan. In the wider provincial establishment, Kaura Mal's appointment as diwan was accompanied by the confirmation of Adina Beg Khan in the faujdari of the Jullundur Doab.

== Campaigns ==
=== Siege of Ram Rauni (1748) ===
In April 1748 the Sikhs constructed a fortified enclosure at Amritsar, later known as Ram Rauni (subsequently associated with Ramgarh). In October 1748 Moin-ul-Mulk moved against the fort during the Diwali gathering at Amritsar and, with Adina Beg's forces joining the operation, opened a siege that continued for several months with frequent skirmishing around the enclosure. The defenders combined night sorties with harassment from outside parties, while Mughal forces attempted to maintain a close blockade. The siege was ultimately lifted after intervention by Moin-ul-Mulk's diwan, Kaura Mal, and a temporary accommodation followed in which the Sikhs received a small jagir.

=== Second Durrani invasion and Sikh raid on Lahore (1748–1750) ===
A renewed Afghan advance under Ahmad Shah Durrani entered the Punjab in late 1748/early 1749, placing additional pressure on Lahore's administration and drawing field forces away from operations against the Sikhs. During Moin-ul-Mulk's absence from Lahore for river-line operations against the Afghans, Sikh forces entered the city's outskirts and damaged or burned outer areas. In the settlement that followed, the chahar mahal (Sialkot, Pasrur, Gujrat and Aurangabad) were treated as a revenue assignment to the Durrani side, with Moin-ul-Mulk making partial payment and undertaking to remit the balance, after which the Afghan army withdrew without advancing further. With the immediate Afghan pressure reduced, the administration resumed coercive measures against Sikh bands and their rural supporters, while Sikh groups continued seasonal raiding and dispersal into hills and forests as circumstances required.

=== Multan campaign against Shah Nawaz Khan (c. 1750) ===
Political conflict within the Mughal elite in north India contributed to a confrontation in the southwest Punjab when Shah Nawaz Khan, holding Subah of Multan under Delhi's influence, expanded his forces and moved into open conflict with Subah of Lahore. Moin-ul-Mulk dispatched Kaura Mal with an army that included contingents associated with Adina Beg and a Sikh contingent under Jassa Singh Ahluwalia. The fighting culminated in Shah Nawaz Khan's defeat and death in battle near the villages named Langana and Burana, after which Kaura Mal entered Multan and re-established Lahore's authority there. Kaura Mal received the title Maharaja Bahadur and was placed in charge of Multan administration on Moin-ul-Mulk's behalf. The period following the Multan settlement is described as one in which Sikh pressure temporarily eased and Sikh religious sites at Amritsar were again publicly serviced and illuminated during Diwali celebrations.

=== Internal rebellions and continuing skirmishes (1750–1751) ===
In mid-1750 Nasir Khan, a senior officer entrusted with the chahar mahal tract, rebelled and was defeated near Sialkot, after which he withdrew toward Delhi in disgrace. Across these years, the Mughal army followed a pattern of attempting to locate and strike Sikh jathas through rapid marches and surprise attacks, while Sikh groups relied on dispersal, skirmishing, and seasonal movement to evade larger forces and to raid when opportunities arose.

=== Third Durrani invasion and the Mehmood Booty battle (Dec 1751–Mar 1752) ===
A larger Afghan invasion resumed in December 1751, with demands linked to arrears and the chahar mahal revenues. Negotiations and partial payment did not prevent the Afghan advance on Lahore. During the campaign, the Subah of Lahore sought to limit Sikh collaboration with the invader and, through Kaura Mal, offered inducements and recruited Sikh raiders for logistical tasks and foraging attacks against Afghan troops. In early 1752, fighting around Lahore culminated in the battle at Mehmood Booty, where Kaura Mal was killed and Moin-ul-Mulk entered Durrani service under a settlement that placed Lahore and Multan within the Durrani sphere while retaining Moin-ul-Mulk as governor on Ahmad Shah's behalf.

=== Renewed offensive measures and Sikh counter-actions (1752–1753) ===
With external pressure temporarily reduced after the 1752 settlement, a renewed drive against Sikh groups, including the confiscation of earlier jagir arrangements and orders for arrests and executions in Lahore took place. Sikh responses continued to include movement to the Shivalik foothills and attacks on vulnerable detachments and officials. In the rainy season of 1752, Sikh forces under Jassa Singh Ahluwalia, acting with hill allies, fought and killed a Mughal revenue-collecting official at Nadaun, after which the Mughal force withdrew. In February 1753 Adina Beg's forces attacked Sikhs gathered for Hola Mohalla at Anandpur resulted in confusion in the dispersed fair and casualties among non-combatants, followed by a compromise that enabled Sikh groups to remain in the Anandpur–Kiratpur area and in parts of the Doab and Malwa. By the cold season of 1753, Sikh raiding intensified in the Lahore region and Moin-ul-Mulk marched from Lahore and established a camp near Tilakpur on the Ravi River while sending out detachments to pursue Sikh parties in multiple directions, with rewards paid for captives, heads, and horses Moin-ul-Mulk was killed at Tilakpur on 3 November 1753, while campaiging against Sikh raiders.

== Impact and Aftermath ==
Moin-ul-Mulk's campaign left the Sikh groups militarily intact and, after his death on 3 November 1753, removed the principal provincial authority directing sustained operations against them. The resulting political vacuum in Lahore coincided with intensified contestation for control of the province. In the three years following his death (November 1753–October 1756), rapid turnover in the governorship and recurring coups and counter-coups weakened the effectiveness of provincial administration and revenue collection.

The campaign also unfolded during a shift in the Punjab’s external alignment. After the 1752 settlement with Ahmad Shah Durrani, Lahore’s subahdar held office within the Durrani imperial sphere, and authority in practice depended on confirmation from Afghanistan as much as (or more than) formal nomination from Delhi. In this context, Mughlani Begam (Moin-ul-Mulk’s widow) and leading officials sought Durrani recognition for the Lahore government in early 1754, reflecting the reduced capacity of the Mughal centre to impose stable control in the province.

Among the most significant longer-term consequences was the expansion of Sikh influence in the countryside through the rakhi (protectorate) System. Under this system, village communities paid a regular contribution to a Sikh chief or misl group in return for protection from plunder and coercion, including restraint by the protecting Sikh party and assistance against other armed groups. The spread of rakhi to large parts of multiple doabs, and the division of protected tracts among cooperating misls, provided a durable basis for Sikh organization, revenue, and territorial presence during the period of administrative instability that followed 1753.

== Bibliography ==
- Kaur, Madanjit (1972). Influence of the Sikh Activities on the Indian Society between 1761–1809 (D.Phil. thesis). Department of History, University of Allahabad.
- Gupta, Hari Ram (1999). History of the Sikhs, Vol. II: Evolution of Sikh Confederacies (1708–69). Munshiram Manoharlal Publishers Pvt. Ltd. ISBN 9788121502481.
- Singh, Ganda (1990). Sardar Jassa Singh Ahluwalia. Publication Bureau, Punjabi University, Patiala.
- Kaur, Harpreet (1988). Sikh Struggle for Sovereignty (1708–1768) (PhD thesis). Department of History, Punjabi University, Patiala.
