= Baba Gurbaksh Singh =

Sikh warrior (1688–1764)

Gurbaksh Singh
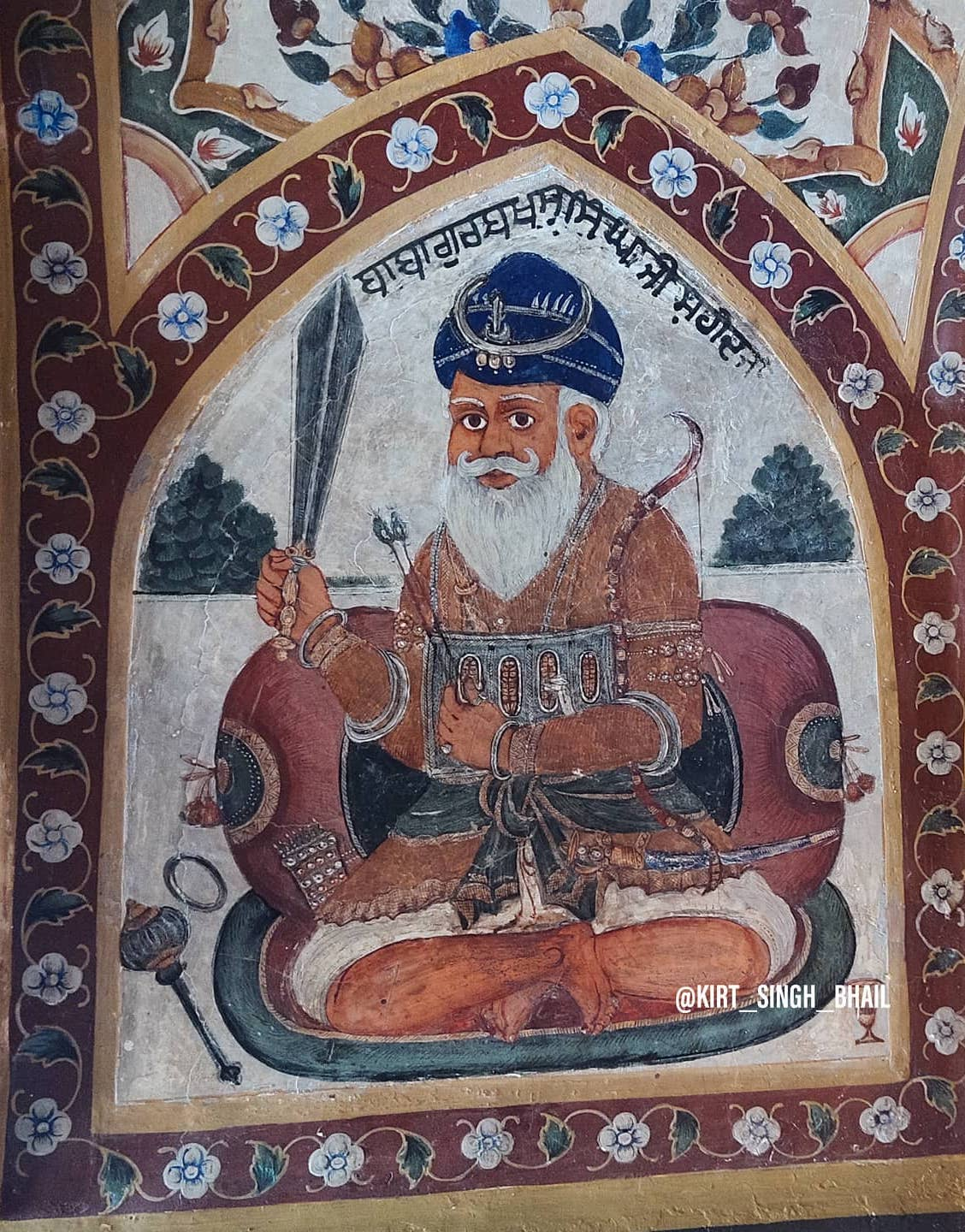
- Born: 10 April 1688; Lil, Amritsar, Lahore Subah, Mughal Empire (present-day India)
- Died: 1 December 1764 (aged 76); Shri Harmandir Sahib, Amritsar, Sikh Confederacy (present-day India)
- Cause of death: Killed in action
- Wars and battles: Mughal-Sikh wars Afghan-Sikh Wars: Battle of Darbar Sahib (1764) †
- Father: Dasaundha
- Mother: Mai Lachchhami

Baba Gurbaksh Singh (Note: Alternately spelt as Gurbax) (10 April 1688 – 1 December 1764) was a Sikh warrior from the 18th century who served under the Shaheedan Misl of the Sikh confederacy. Gurbaksh Singh along with 29 other Sikh warriors led a last stand against the Afghan and Baloch forces on 1 December 1764, at Amritsar. It was in this skirmish that Baba Gurbaksh Singh along with 29 other Sikhs were killed. He is remembered by Sikhs as one of their notable martyrs of the 18th century. He is one of two Sikh individuals who have a teġ vāhī shrine at the Golden Temple complex commemorating their martyrdom, the other being Baba Deep Singh.

== Early life ==
Gurbaksh Singh was born in the village of Lil in Amritsar district on 10 April 1688, and was the son of Dasaundha and Mai Lachchhami Gurbaksh Singh was a contemporary of the tenth Sikh guru, Guru Gobind Singh, and was initiated into the Khalsa during the Vaisakhi of 1699. He completed his religious education under Bhai Mani Singh and he would soon join the Shaheedan Misl under Baba Deep Singh. Gurbaksh Singh would lead a group of Sikh warriors who were famous for their bravery and gallantry against both Mughal and Afghan armies.

== Last stand in Amritsar (1764) ==
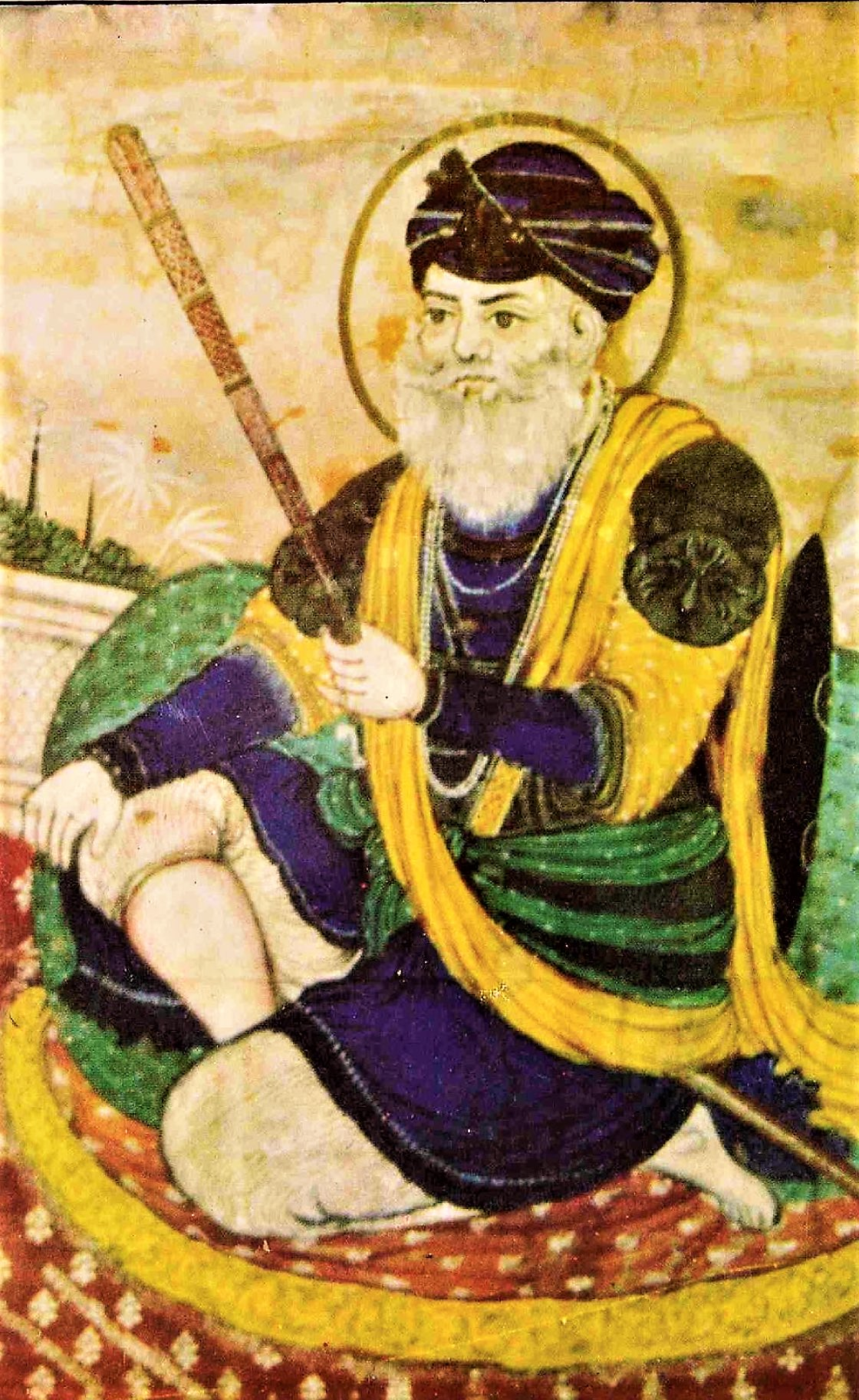
Fresco of Baba Gurbaksh Singh Shaheed from Gurdwara Baba Atal in Amritsar

From 1763 to 1764, the Sikh misls would greatly expand their territory over the region of Punjab. The Sikhs would successfully occupy Lahore and expand their territory into Multan and Derajat. This greatly weakened Afghan rule over Punjab, which caused Ahmad Shah Abdali to launch a seventh invasion into the Indian Subcontinent.

Ahmad Shah Abdali arrived in Punjab and reached Eminabad.It was at Eminabad that Ahmad Shah was Joined by his Baloch ally Nasir Khan.Ahmad Shah Abdali commanded a force numbering 18,000 while Nasir Khan commanded a force numbering 12,000. The Afghan and Baloch forces marched towards Lahore in where they got into a Skirmish with the Sikhs under the command of Charat Singh Sukerchakia.

Ahmad Shah heard news that the Sikhs had retreated towards Amritsar. Ahmad Shah arrived in Amritsar on 1 December 1764; however, the Afghan forces did not come across any large gathering of Sikhs. Baba Gurbaksh Singh, Nihal Singh, Basant Singh, Man Singh along with 26 other Sikhs had stayed in Amritsar to fight a last stand against the Afghan and Baloch forces.

The Afghans were soon attacked by 30 Sikhs led by Baba Gurbaksh Singh at Shri Harmandir Sahib. It was in this skirmish that Baba Gurbaksh Singh along with the 29 Sikh defenders were killed.

== Legacy ==
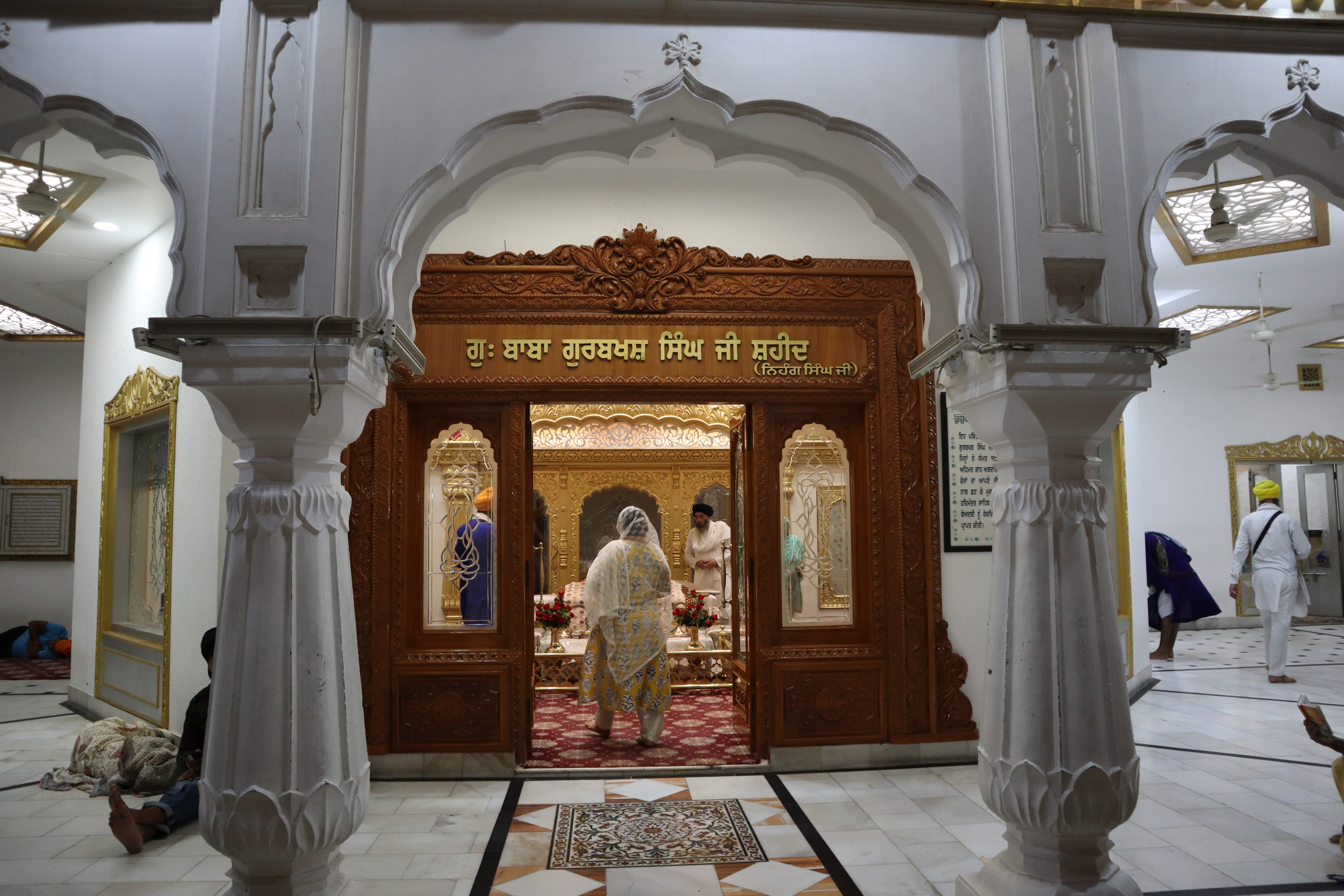
Photograph of the sanctum sanctorum of Gurdwara Sri Shaheed Ganj Baba Gurbaksh Singh within the Golden Temple complex, Amritsar, Punjab, India, April 2023

The remains of Baba Gurbaksh Singh along with the other dead Sikhs were cremated and a memorial called Shaheedganj was built to commemorate the fallen Sikhs.

== See also ==
- Nihang
- Martyrdom and Sikhism

== Sources ==
Primary Sources

- Muhammad, Noor (2020). Singh, Ganda (ed.). Jangnamah (2nd ed.). Khalsa College Amritsar.

Secondary Sources

- Gandhi, Surjit (1999). Sikhs In The Eighteenth Century. Singh Bros. ISBN 81-7205-217-0.
- Gupta, Hari (2007). History of the Sikhs Volume II. Evolution of the Sikh Confederacies (1707-1769) Munishiram Manoharlal Publishers Pvt. Ltd. ISBN 81-215-0248-9.
- Singh, Ganda (1990). Sardar Jassa Singh Ahluwalia. Publication Bureau Punjabi University, Patiala.
- Singh, Harbans (2011). The Encyclopedia of Sikhism Volume II E-L (3rd ed.). Punjabi University, Patiala. ISBN 81-7380-204-1.
- "SHAHIDGANJ BABA GURBAKSH SINGH, AMRITSAR" The Sikh Encyclopedia. Retrieved 13 January 2023.
