= Kiri Afgana =

Kiri Afghana
- Village
- Country: India
- State: Punjab
- District: Gurdaspur
- Tehsil: Kahnuwan
- Region: Majha

Government
  - Type: Panchayat raj
  - Body: Gram panchayat

Area
  - Total: 1,076 ha (2,660 acres)

Population (2019)
  - Total: 3,294; 1,720/1,574 ♂/♀
  - Scheduled Castes: 112; 55/57 ♂/♀
  - Total Households: 648

Languages
  - Official: Punjabi
- Time zone: UTC+5:30 (IST)
- Telephone: 01872
- ISO 3166 code: IN-PB
- Vehicle registration: PB-06
- Website: gurdaspur.nic.in

Kiri Afgana is a village in kahnuwan in Gurdaspur district of Punjab State, India. It is located 21 kilometres (13 mi) from sub district headquarter, 40 kilometres (25 mi) from district headquarter and 10 kilometres (6.2 mi) from Qadian. The village is administrated by Sarpanch an elected representative of the village.

== Demography ==
As of 2019, the village has a total number of 648 houses and a population of 3294 of which 1720 are males while 1574 are females. According to the report published by Census India in 2011, out of the total population of the village 112 people are from Schedule Caste and the village does not have any Schedule Tribe population so far.

== See also ==
- List of villages in India
