= Yahya Khan (governor) =

Mughal Subahdar of Lahore from 1745 to 1747

Yahyā Khān

Subahdar of Lahore
- In office 1745–1747
- Monarch: Muhammad Shah
- Preceded by: Zakariya Khan Bahadur
- Succeeded by: Shah Nawaz Khan

Personal details
- Spouse: A daughter of Itimad ad-Daula
- Children: Nahar Khan; Daud Khan

Yahya Khan, also spelt as Yahia Khan or Yahiya Khan, was the Mughal subahdar (governor) of Lahore Subah from 1745 to 1747.

== Early life ==
Yahya Khan was the son of Zakaria Khan, who preceded him as subahdar. Zakariya Khan died in 1745 and was survived by three sons: Yahya Khan, Hayatullah Khan, and Mir Baqi. Yahya Khan and Hayatullah Khan were at the imperial court at the time of the father's death whilst Mir Momin and Nimmat Khan were away on an expedition against the Hill States. The death of Zakariyah Khan further hastened the end of Mughal rule in the subah. A conflict between the emperor Muhammad Shah and his wazir, Qamruddin, led to a delay in appointing a replacement governor. Eventually, Qamruddin was made governor of both the Lahore and Multan subahs, and he nominated first Mir Momin Khan and later Yahya Khan, the son of late Zakariya Khan and his son-in-law, to deputise for him as governor in the two subahs.

== Governance of Lahore province ==
The absence of a strong administration since Zakariyah Khan's death hindered Yahya Khan. He was forced to deal with increased raiding by Sikhs and a rebellion by Hayatullah Khan, his brother and governor of Multan. In order to take revenge of his brother Jaspat Rai's death, Lakhpat Rai convinced Yahya Khan to take action against Sikhs. Yahya Khan and his allies perpetrated the Chhota Ghallughara massacre in 1746, where 7,000 Sikhs were slain and 3,000 were captured and later executed. Yahya Khan's son Nahar Khan was killed by the Sikhs during the Chhota Ghallughara campaign.

During 1746–1747, Shah Nawaz Khan was involved in a civil war with Yahya Khan. In March 1747, he entered Lahore and proclaimed himself to be the subedar, putting Yahya Khan in prison. On 21 March 1747 Hayatullah Khan successfully defeated Yayha Khan in battle. The ousting of Yahya Khan was the first instance of a legitimate appointed governor being displaced in the subah.

== Later life and death ==
Yahya Khan later became an ascetic with the name of Yahya Shah. He had married a daughter of Itimad-ad-Daula, Qamar-ud-Din Khan, the grand vizier, and their son, Khwaja Daud Khan, later settled down in Farrukhabad, where he died.
