= Battle of Amritsar (1757) =

Battle between the Afghans and Sikhs

- Part of Indian Campaign of Ahmad Shah Durrani and Afghan–Sikh Wars
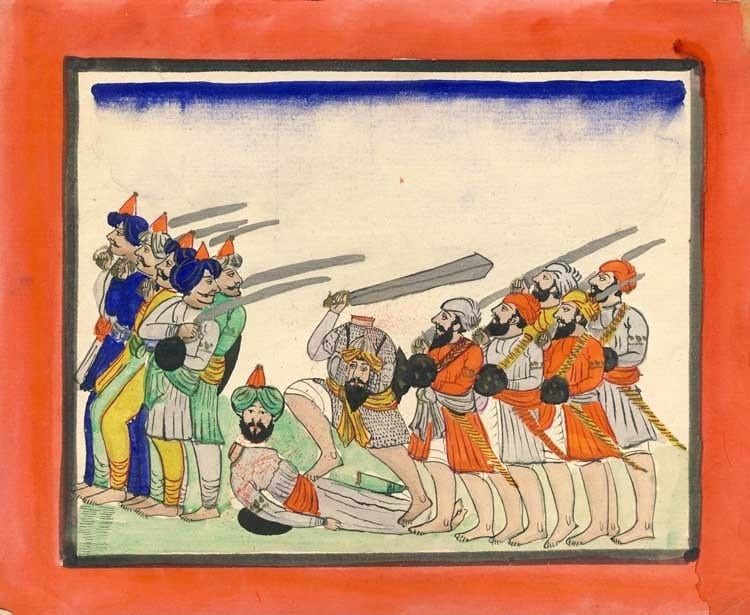
- 19th century painting of a headless Baba Deep Singh fighting the Afghan forces at the Battle of Amritsar, by Gian Singh Naqqash
Date	11 November 1757
Location	Gohalwar village near Amritsar
Result	Afghan victory

Belligerents
Durrani Empire	Shaheedan Misl

Commanders and leaders
Timur Shah Durrani; Haji Atai Khan; Jahan Khan; Jamal Shah †; Qasim Khan; Mir Nimat Khan †	Baba Deep Singh †; Ram Singh †; Sajjan Singh †; Bahadur Singh †; Agarh Singh †; Hira Singh †; Kuar Singh †; Mana Singh †; Sant Singh †

Strength
20,000 or 22,000	5,000 or 6,000

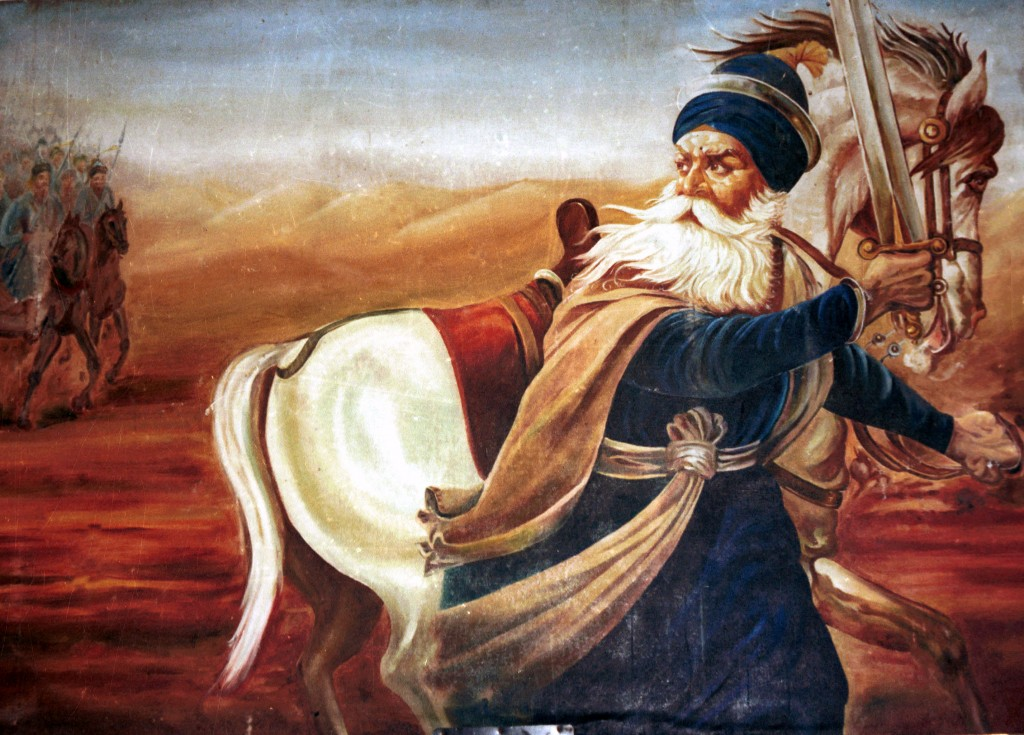
20th century portrait of Baba Deep Singh during the Battle of Amritsar

The Battle of Amritsar, also known as the Battle of Gohalwar, was fought between the Durrani Empire and Shaheedan Misl of the Dal Khalsa on 11 November 1757. Following the fourth invasion of Ahmad Shah Durrani, his army was attacked by Sikh bands under the command of Ala Singh and Baba Deep Singh. Following the attacks, Ahmad Shah desecrated the Sikh holy site known as the Shri Harmandir Sahib in Amritsar. The news of the desecration reached Baba Deep Singh who vowed to liberate the holy site from the Afghans. This resulted in a pitched battle being fought in the village of Gohalwar, near Amritsar. The battle resulted in Baba Deep Singh being killed and an Afghan victory.

== Background ==
In January 1757, Ahmad Shah Durrani was returning to Afghanistan after raiding Hindustan and sacking Delhi, when his army under Prince Timur Shah and Jahan Khan were attacked by Sikh bands under Ala Singh and Baba Deep Singh near Sirhind, seizing the treasures they were carrying. The army was again attacked, harassed and plundered at Malerkotla. When Ahmad Shah reached Lahore, he sent a military detachment to sack the town of Amritsar, which destroyed the Harmandir Sahib and massacred the Sikh population.

In May 1757, Ahmad Shah appointed Timur Shah as Governor of Lahore, with Jahan Khan as his deputy, and ordered Timur Shah to chastise the Sikhs. The Afghan government pursued the Sikhs, who sought refuge in Himalayan tracts and the Malwa Desert. News of the desecration of Shri Harmandir Sahib reached Baba Deep Singh, who was stationed at Damdama Sahib. Infuriated, he vowed to liberate Harmandir Sahib from the Afghans, and to celebrate the Diwali festival at Amritsar. Baba Deep Singh managed to gather a band of around a thousand followers from different villages before advancing towards Amritsar.

== Battle ==
Key historical locations of the November 1757 Battle of Amritsar (Gohalwar)

Having received intelligence that the Sikhs had gathered at Amritsar, Jahan Khan mobilized an Afghan force to fight them. He ordered every man in Lahore who owned a horse, whether in the service of the government or not, to join his expedition against the Sikhs. Mughlani Begum sent her personal guards to join him, and Qasim Khan also joined the expedition against the Sikhs. Jahan Khan sent word to Haji Atai Khan asking him to join him at Amritsar, and with an army of two thousand troops reached the village of Gohalwar. According to Surjit Singh Gandhi, the total number of Afghan soldiers in the battle was around 20,000, whereas Deep Singh mobilized an army of 5,000 or 6,000 soldiers.

During the battle, Jahan Khan was nearly overwhelmed by Sikh forces until reinforcements from Haji Atai Khan arrived later during the battle. The Sikhs were defeated and many were massacred, while Jahan Khan achieved both a victory and the death of Baba Deep Singh.

Baba Deep Singh dueled Jamal Shah, one of the Afghan commanders, and suffered a mortal wound to the neck, while Jamal Shah was killed. Despite the severe injury, Baba Deep Singh continued to fight until he collapsed and died. According to Tony Jacques, Baba Deep Singh was killed by Attal Khan.

Legend says that Baba Deep Singh was fully decapitated but continued to fight against the Afghans while holding his head on one hand and his sword on the other.

== Aftermath ==
Following their defeat, the Sikhs were pursued as far as Amritsar. When the Afghans entered the city, they clashed with five Sikh soldiers stationed at the main gate. During this incident Mir Nimat Khan, one of the chiefs from Lahore, was killed. The Afghans set up camp for the night and returned to Lahore a few days later. A monument was built to commemorate Baba Deep Singh along with the other Sikhs who were killed in the battle. Other Sikh soldiers and commanders who were killed in the battle include Ram Singh, Sajjan Singh, Bahadur Singh, Agarh Singh, Hira Singh, Kuar Singh, Mana Singh, and Sant Singh.

== See also ==
- Jaspat Rai
- Nihang
- Battle of Mahilpur
- Maratha conquest of North-west India

== Sources ==
- Banerjee, Himadri (2002). The Khalsa and the Punjab Studies in Sikh History, to the Nineteenth Century. Tulika Books.
- Grewal, J.S. (1990). The Sikhs of the Punjab. Cambridge University Press. p. 91. ISBN 0-521-63764-3.
- Hoernle, August Friedrich Rudolf; Stark, Herbert Alick (1906). A history of India. Orissa Mission Press. p. 113.
- Jacques, Tony (2006). Dictionary of Battles and Sieges. Greenwood Press. p. 400. ISBN 978-0-313-33536-5. Archived from the original on 2015-06-26.
- Lansford, Tom (2017). Afghanistan at War: From the 18th-Century Durrani Dynasty to the 21st Century. ABC-CLIO. ISBN 9781598847604.
- Singh, Rishi (2015). State Formation and the Establishment of Non-Muslim Hegemony: Post-Mughal 19th-century Punjab. SAGE Publications.
- Singha, H. S (2000). The encyclopedia of Sikhism (over 1000 entries). Hemkunt Press. p. 107. ISBN 978-81-7010-301-1.
- Barlow, Hugh D. (2015). Dead for Good: Martyrdom and the Rise of the Suicide Bomber. Taylor & Francis. p. 91. ISBN 9781317261575.
- Chadha, Vivek (2005). Low Intensity Conflicts in India: An Analysis. SAGE Publications. p. 171. ISBN 9780761933250.
- Singh, Bhagat (1993). A History of the Sikh Misals. Publication Bureau Punjabi University Patiala ISBN 978-8130201818
- Gupta, Hari (2007). History Of The Sikhs Vol. II Evolution Of Sikh Confederacies (1707-69). Munshiram Manoharlal Publishers Pvt. Ltd. ISBN 81-215-0248-9
- Singh, Ganda (1959). Ahmad Shah Durrani, Father of Modern Afghanistan. Asia Publishing house.
- Singh, Harbans (1995). The Encyclopedia of Sikhism Vol I A-D (2nd ed.) Patiala:Punjabi University.
- Singh, Bhagat Lakshman (1923). Sikh Martyrs. Ludhiana: Lahore Book Shop
