= Vadda Ghallughara Memorial =

Memorial in Punjab, India

Coordinates: 30°38′24″N 75°50′33″E

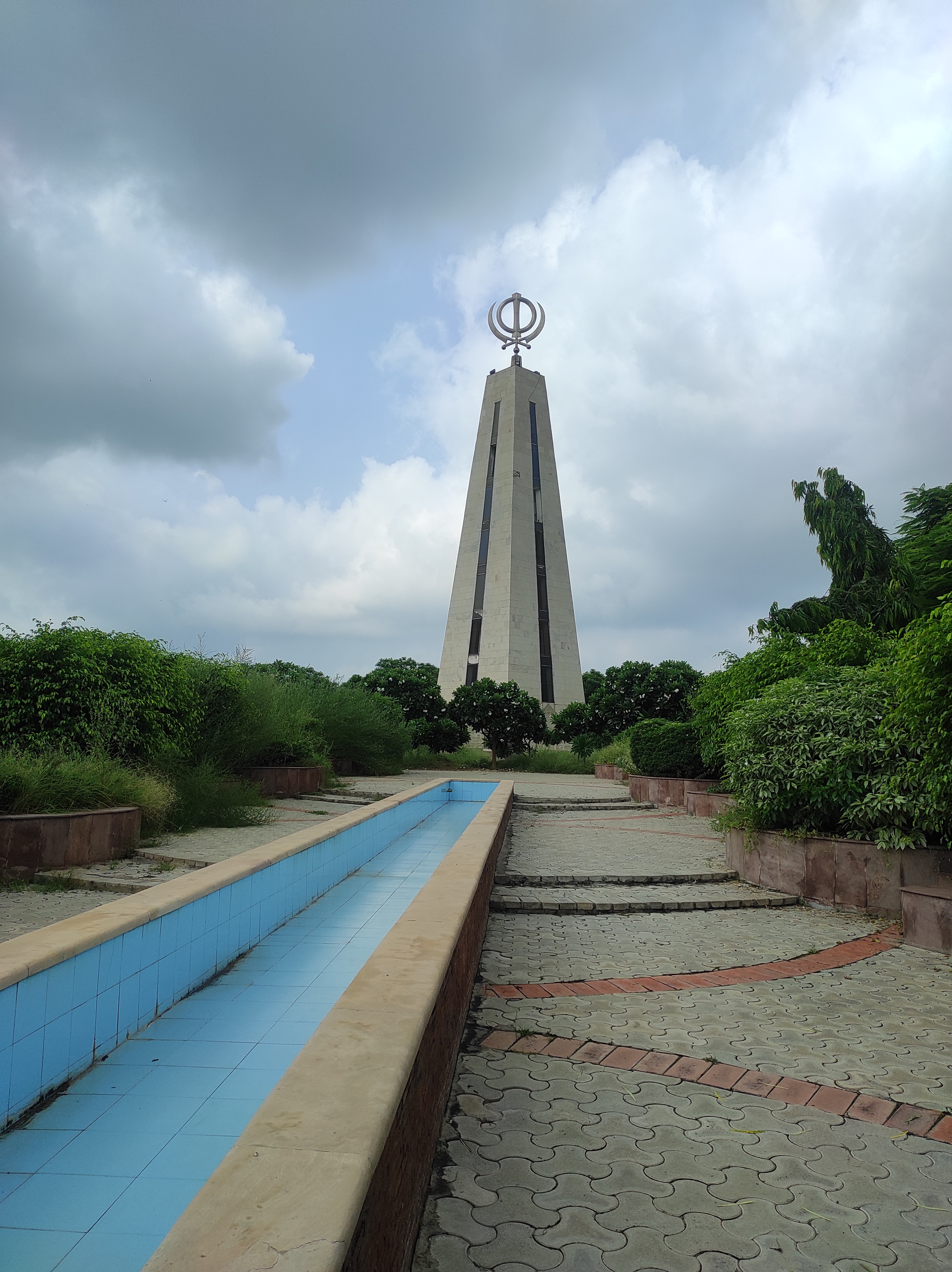
Vadda Ghallughara Memorial in Kup-Rohira, Punjab, India, 29 August 2025

The Vadda Ghallughara Memorial, also known as the Vadda Ghallughara Yaadgar, is a memorial to the Sikh massacre of 1762, known as the Vadda Ghallughara, where over 30,000 Sikhs were slain by Afghan invaders. The 9.5–10 acre memorial is located in Kup-Rohira, Ahmedgarh tehsil, Sangrur district, Punjab, India. (Note: Also spelt as 'Wadda Ghallughara Memorial'.) The foundation stone of the memorial dedicated to the victims of the Vadda Ghallughara was set in 2009 at Kutba but it was later shifted to Rohira next year, which upset the locals of Kutba. On 18 October 2010, Sukhbir Badal re-laid the stone at Rohira. The memorial was built at a cost of Rs 12–16 crore and in-augurated by then Chief Minister Parkash Singh Badal on 29 November 2011. However, the memorial was only opened to the public years later on 5 February 2016. The memorial has suffered from a lack of funding for its maintenance and development. It features a 110-foot tall tower, open air theatre, auditorium, information centre, and an interpretation centre. According to Vikramdeep Johal, the memorial's raising has been criticized by the Congress party as a political stunt by the joint SAD-BJP government in the run-up to the assembly elections.

== See also ==
- Chhota Ghallughara Memorial
