= Shaheedan Misl =

Sovereign state of the Sikh Confederacy

The Shaheedan Misl, also known as the Shahid Misl or Nihang Misl, was one of twelve Sikh Misls that later became the Sikh Empire. It held a small amount of territory in the Malwa (Punjab) area around the Damdama Sahib before being incorporated into the Sikh Empire of the Sukerchakia Misl by Ranjit Singh.

Deep Singh (later Baba Deep Singh), son of Bhagta, of village Pahuwind (now district Amritsar) was the founder of this Misl. Earlier this Misl was known as Deep Singh’s Misl but after the martyrdom of Deep Singh in 1757 and another Sikh general Gurbakhsh Singh (of Leel village) in 1764, this Misl came to be known as Shaheedan Misl.

The Shaheedan Misl was more akin to a religious-order rather than resembling a large, family clan like most of the other misls of the Sikh Confederacy.

== History ==
The misl was established by Jats. In 1748, Baba Deep Singh was appointed the leader of the Shaheedan Misl and the Mahant of the Takht Sri Damdama Sahib. In 1757, Ahmad Shah Abdali invaded India and sent an army to the Harmindar Sahib to block Sikhs from entering the Gurdwara. Baba Deep Singh and a company of men who rode with him to free the gurdwara were killed in the Battle of Amritsar (1757) against the Durrani Army. His successor, Suddha Singh, later led the misl into a skirmish against the Afghan government of Jalandhar City. The first two leaders of the misl were considered Shaheeds, or martyrs, by their contemporaries so the misl became known as, Shaheedan Misl, or the misl of the martyrs. The misl was annexed by the Sikh Empire at some point in the early 19th century and became a part of the Sikh Empire. The Nihang order of Sikhs maintains the traditions of this misl.

== Territory ==
The misl originated from Pohuwind near Amritsar and Marana near Lahore. The Shaheedans held territory in eastern Malwa. The Shaheedan Misl jointly controlled parts of the Punjab Plains southward of the Sutlej river, between Karnal and Ferozepore, alongside other misls.

== List of leaders ==
Prominent leaders of the misl were:

- Baba Deep Singh
- Sudh Singh
- Karam Singh
- Gulab Singh
- Akali Naina Singh
- Akali Phula Singh

== Gallery ==
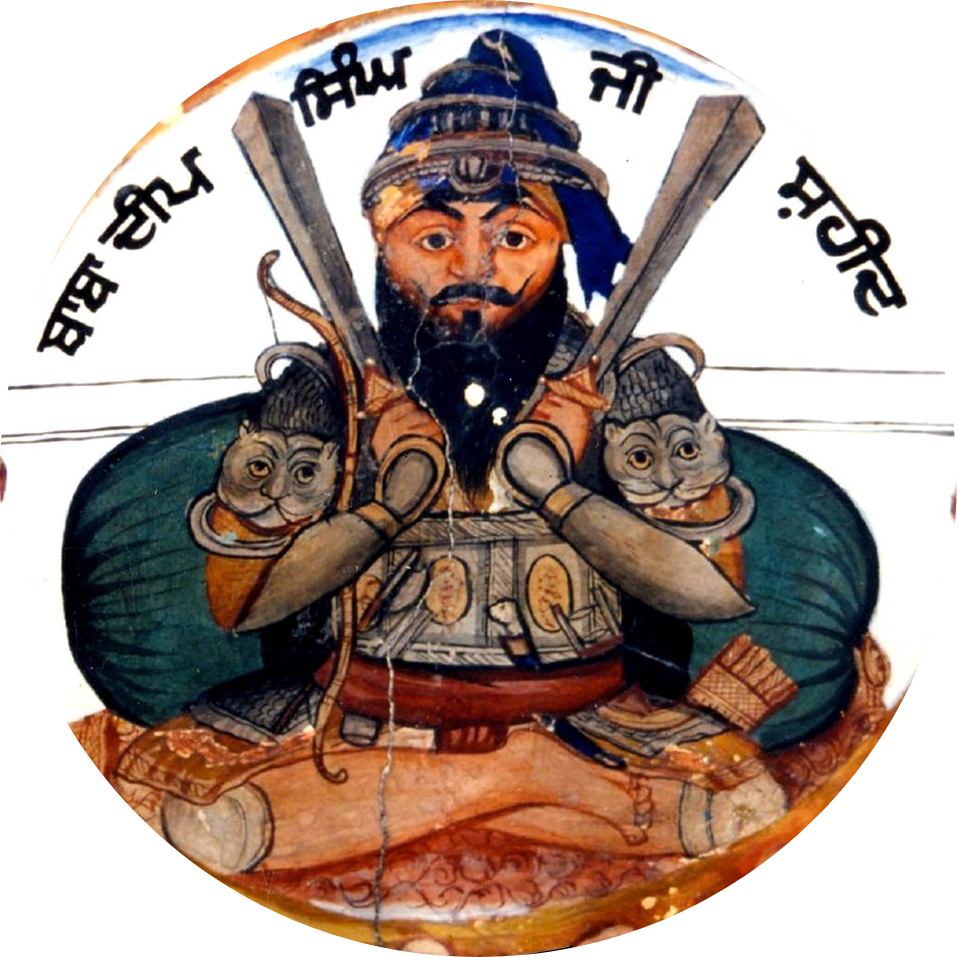
Fresco of shaheed Baba Deep Singh from Gurdwara Baba Atal, Amritsar

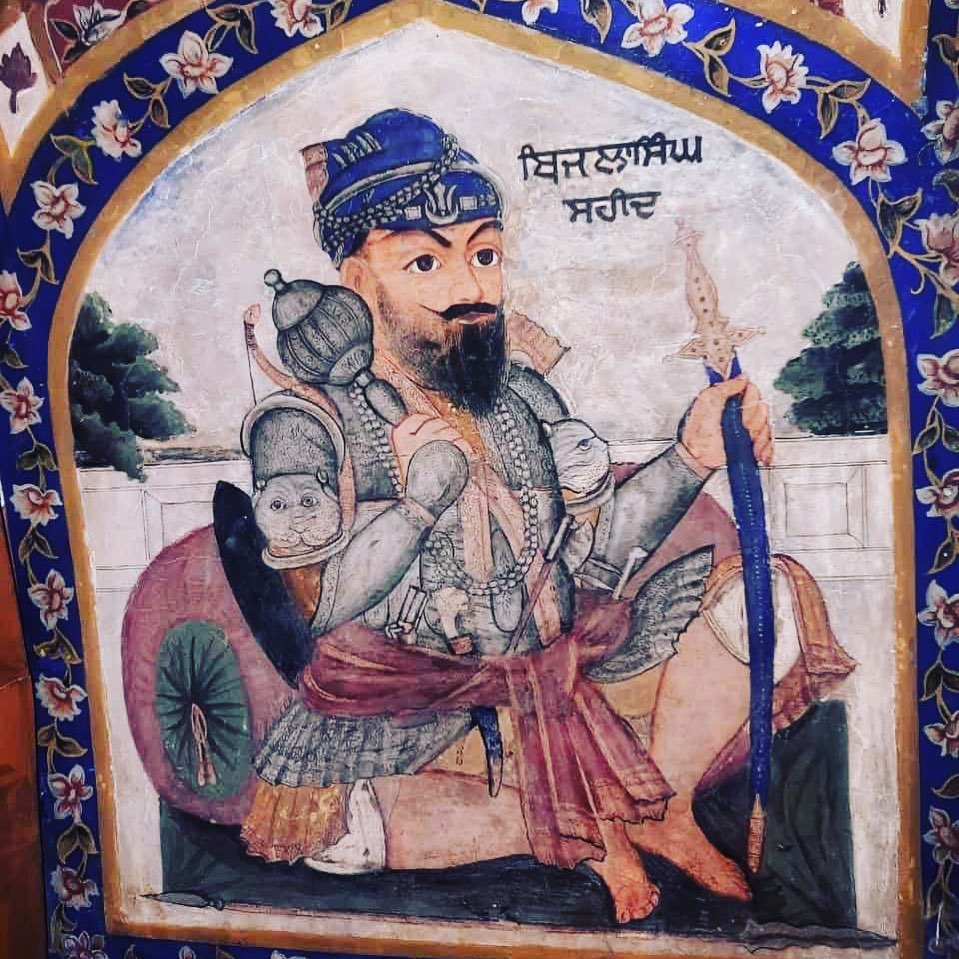
Fresco of Bijla Singh from Gurdwara Baba Atal. He was a warrior of the Shaheedan Misl and contemporary of Baba Deep Singh

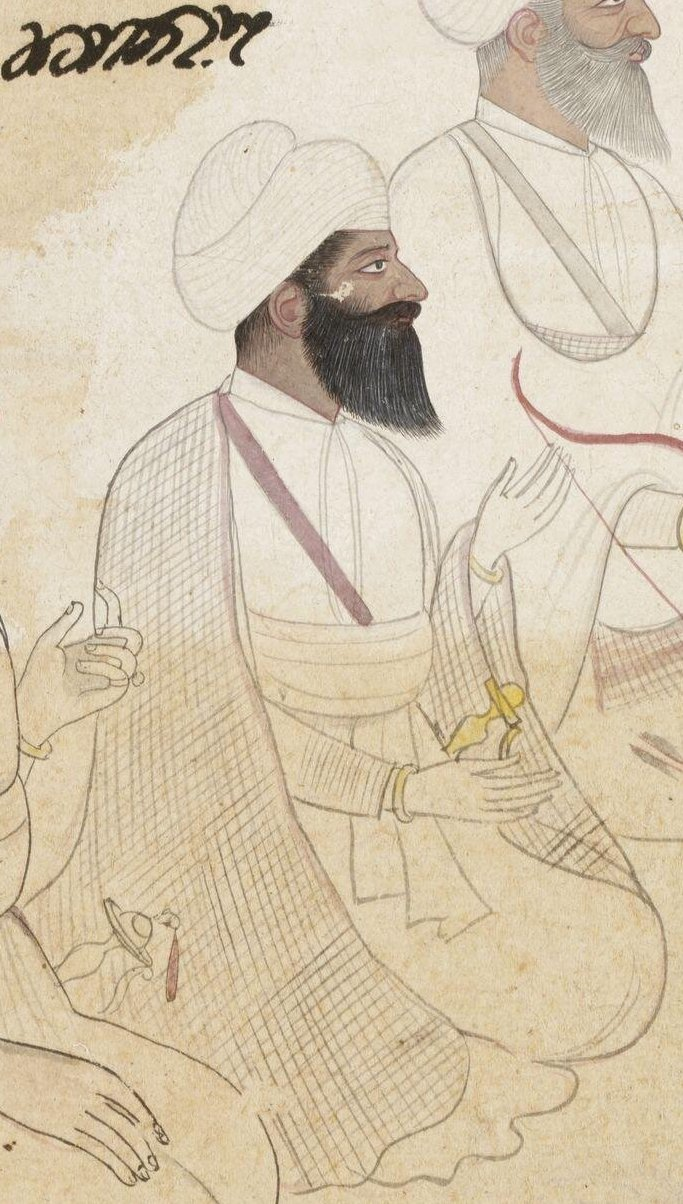
Detail of Karam Singh Sidhu of the Shaheedan Misl from a painting three seated Sikh sardars, circa late 18th century

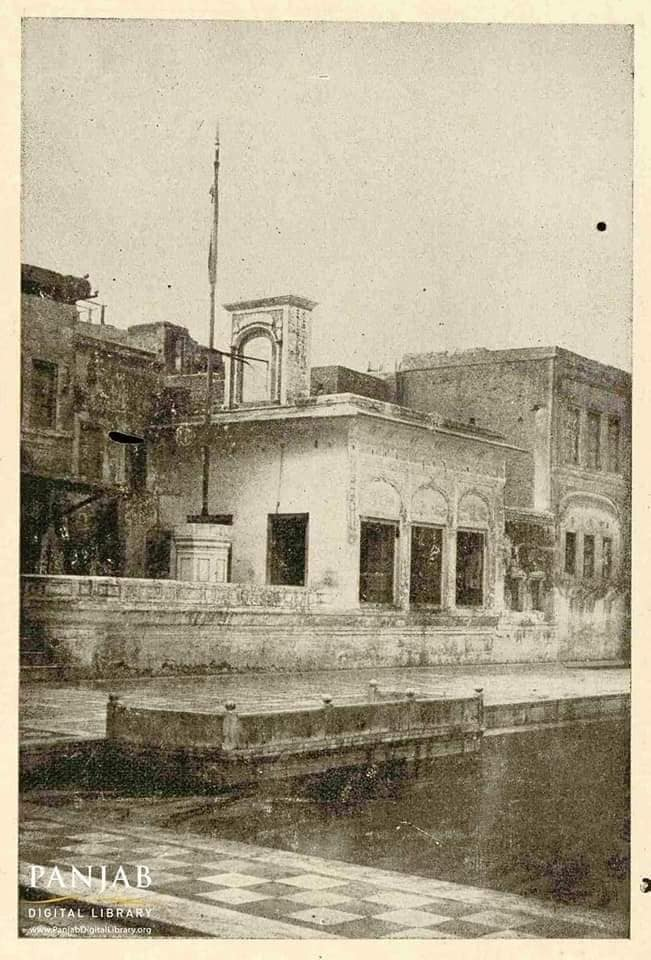
Photograph of the Bunga Amar Shaheed Baba Deep Singh at the Golden Temple complex in Amritsar, it has since been demolished
