= Chhota Ghallughara Memorial =

Memorial in Punjab, India

Coordinates: 31.9697°N 75.4761°E

The Chhota Ghallughara Memorial, also known as the Chhota Ghallughara Yaadgar, is a memorial to the Sikh massacre of 1746, known as the Chhota Ghallughara, where over 10,000 Sikhs were slain by the Mughal administration and their allies. (Note: Also spelt as 'Chota Ghallughara Memorial'.) The 10-acre memorial is located in Kahnuwan Chhamb, Gurdaspur district, Punjab, India and was inaugurated by Parkash Singh Badal on 28 November 2011. The site is connected to a special pilgrimage bus service route by District Heritage Society Gurdaspur. A 15-kilowatt solar plant was inaugurated at the site in 2022. According to Vikramdeep Johal, the memorial's raising has been criticized by the Congress party as a political stunt by the joint SAD-BJP government in the run-up to the assembly elections.

== See also ==
- Vadda Ghallughara Memorial
