= Baddoki Gosaian =

Pakistani village

- Village
- Location within Pakistan
- Coordinates: 32.273056°N 74.127717°E
- Country: Pakistan
- Province: Punjab
- District: Gujranwala
- Time zone: UTC+5 (PST)

Baddoki Gosaian is a village situated in Gujranwala District, Punjab, Pakistan. It lies to the northwest of Gujranwala towards Wazirabad. The village has remnants of buildings from the Sikh Empire era.

== History ==
Before the Partition of India, Baddoki Gosaian was home to Sikhs, Hindus, Muslims, and Christians. In 1947, Hindu and Sikh families migrated to India, and Muslim families moved from there into the village. Today, while there is a small Christian community, the majority of the population is Muslim.

Just north of the village, there is an old Shiva temple that has been neglected over time and shows clear signs of wear and vandalism.

== See also ==
- Badoki Saikhwan
- Qila Didar Singh
