= Lakhpat Rai =

Mughal official (died 1747)

Diwan of Lahore
- In office 1726–1747
- Preceded by: unknown
- Succeeded by: Kaura Mal

Personal details
- Died: 1746 Punjab, Mughal Empire
- Children: Harbhaj Rai; Dalpat Rai
- Relatives: Jaspat Rai (brother), Dalpat Rai (son)
- Known for: Involvement in the Chhota Ghallughara

Lakhpat Rai was the Diwan (chief minister) of Lahore for Yahya Khan Bahadur, the Subahdar of Subahs of Lahore and Multan, from 1726 until his death on March 21, 1747. He is best known for his role in a large scale massacre of Sikhs in 1746 called the Chhota Ghallughara, in which an estimated 7,000 Sikhs were killed. However, Purnima Dhavan gives a smaller figure of 400 Sikhs being killed in the massacre.

Lakhpat Rai and his brother Jaspat Rai belonged to a Khatri family from Kalanaur. Lakhpat Rai constructed the Suka Talab in Lahore, which was situated near the Gurdwara Shikargarh Patshahi Chhevin. Jaspat Rai was killed by the Sikhs in a raid. In order to take revenge of his brother's death, Lakhpat Rai convinced Yahya Khan, the Mughal governor, to take action against Sikhs. As per Rattan Singh Bhangu's Panth Prakash, Lakhpat Rai personally supervised the operation and specifically sought out copies of the Guru Granth Sahib in-order to destroy them. During the Chhota Ghallughara campaign, Lakhpat Rai's son Harbhaj Rai was killed by the Sikhs. Lakhpat Rai was later killed by the Sikhs. According to Surjit Singh Gandhi, he was killed in 1748. His son, Dalpat Rai, sought asylum in Jammu and settled there.
