= Kahnuwan =

- Town
- Location in Punjab, India Kahnuwan (India)
- Coordinates: 31°54′N 75°27′E
- Country: India
- State: Punjab
- District: Gurdaspur

Languages
  - Official: Punjabi
  - Regional: Punjabi
- Time zone: UTC+5:30 (IST)

Kahnuwan, also known as Kahnuwan Chhamb, is a town, development block and sub-tehsil of Gurdaspur district in the Indian state of Punjab. The Chhota Ghallughara Memorial is located here.

== History ==
The town was named after Rajput king Raja Kanva of Harchand Rajput Dynasty who came to this region to defeat Pathans. . After defeating Pathans , he won 5400 acers of land and nearby villages all across kahnuwan region . Thus, Harchand Hindu Rajputs remain a dominant landlord clan in the kahnuwan region.

In recent history Kahnuwan village have also Sikhs history known as kahnuwan shamb. On 10 March 1746, a large number of Sikhs were massacred by Mughals and their allies when the Sikhs were encamped in the jungle-swamps of Kahnuwan. This event is known as the Chhota Ghalughara.

== Demographics ==
According to Census 2011 information the location code or village code of Kahnuwan village is 028377. Kahnuwan village is located in Gurdaspur tehsil of Gurdaspur district in Punjab, India. It is situated 22km away from sub-district headquarter Gurdaspur (tehsildar office) and 22km away from district headquarter Gurdaspur. As per 2009 stats, Nawan Pind Abadi Kahnuwan is the gram panchayat of Kahnuwan village.

The total geographical area of village is 2515 hectares. Kahnuwan has a total population of 8,972 peoples, out of which male population is 4,623 while female population is 4,349. Literacy rate of kahnuwan village is 72.36% out of which 76.12% males and 68.36% females are literate. There are about 1,666 houses in kahnuwan village. Pincode of kahnuwan village locality is 143528.

== Religion ==
Kahnuwan has about 5 Hindu temples, 16 gurudwaras, three churches and five dargahs.

There are 8 Hindu temples, 6 Muslim dargahs, 3 churchs and 6 Sikh Gurdwaras including historical gurdwara Ghallughara sahib. Vijay Dashmi fare of kahnuwan is very famous one, a large number of people come in Dushehra ground to celebrate Dushehra.
