= Bota Singh =

Sikh martyr (died 1739)

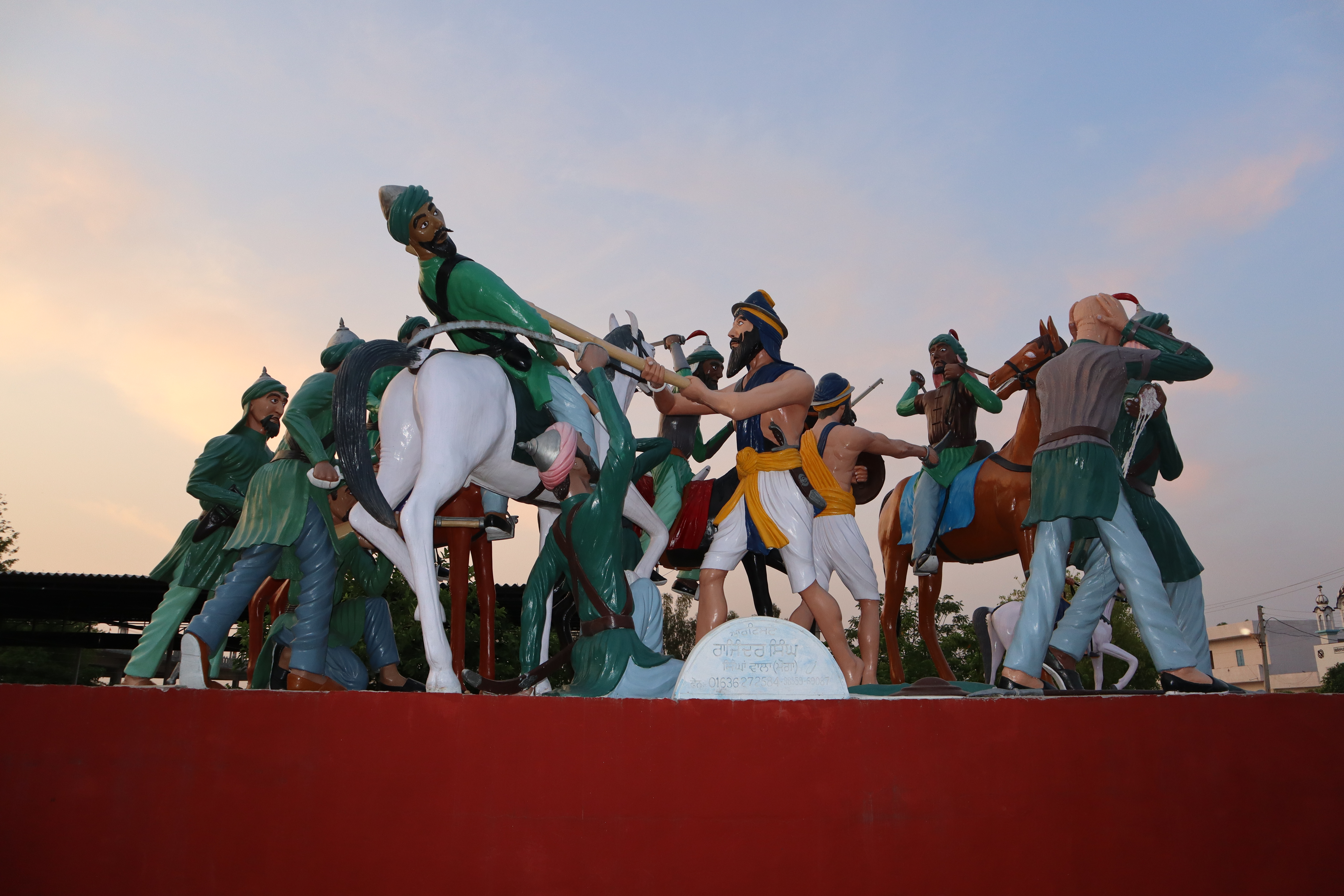
Diorama sculptural monument of Bhai Bota Singh and Bhai Garja Singh engaged in-combat against the Mughals at Gurdwara Shaheed Baba Tega Singh Ji, Chand Purana, Bagha Purana tehsil, Moga district, Punjab, India, April 2023

Bota Singh (died 1739) was a Sikh martyr who was killed by Mughal forces dispatched by Zakaria Khan under the command of Jalal Din after he started collecting a tax from travellers on the main road to Lahore as a mark of sovereignty for the Sikhs. He is remembered by Sikhs as one of the notable martyrs of the 18th century. His martyrdom was a sign of the changing power dynamics of Mughal Punjab between the Mughals and the Sikhs.

== Biography ==
Bota Singh was from the village of Bharana in Amritsar district. He was born into a Sandhu Jat family. His companion Garja Singh was of a Rangreta background.

During the days of anti-Sikh persecution when there was a bounty for the head of a Sikh, the Sikhs had dispersed to hiding spots, such as forests. Bhai Bota Singh lived in one such forest near Tarn Taran and would come out of hiding at night to find food and sometimes visit Amritsar to take a dip in the holy pool around Darbar Sahib. One day he was noticed by some zamindars who thought he was a Sikh but a member of their party objected saying he could not have been a Sikh, for had he been one, he would not have concealed himself. Other versions of the story say that Mughal guards were passing the forest when one said that the Sikhs were all deceased and there were none left.

Vexed by the observer's remark, Bota Singh set on a plan whereby he and his companion Garja Singh took up a position on the main highway near Tarn Taran in a dilapidated inn. There, they proclaimed the sovereignty of the Khalsa and collected a small toll tax (octroi tax) from each passerby. However, this failed to attract the Mughal governor's attention so they also sent a notice with a traveller for the governor of Lahore province to be noticed. After seven days 1000 soldiers with 100 horsemen under Jalal Din came to apprehend the two Sikhs who then died fighting in 1739 as they refused to surrender.

== Legacy ==
An account of Bota Singh's martyrdom is recorded in Rattan Singh Bhangu's Panth Prakash.
