= Eminabad =

City in Punjab, Pakistan

Eminabad ایمن آباد
- City
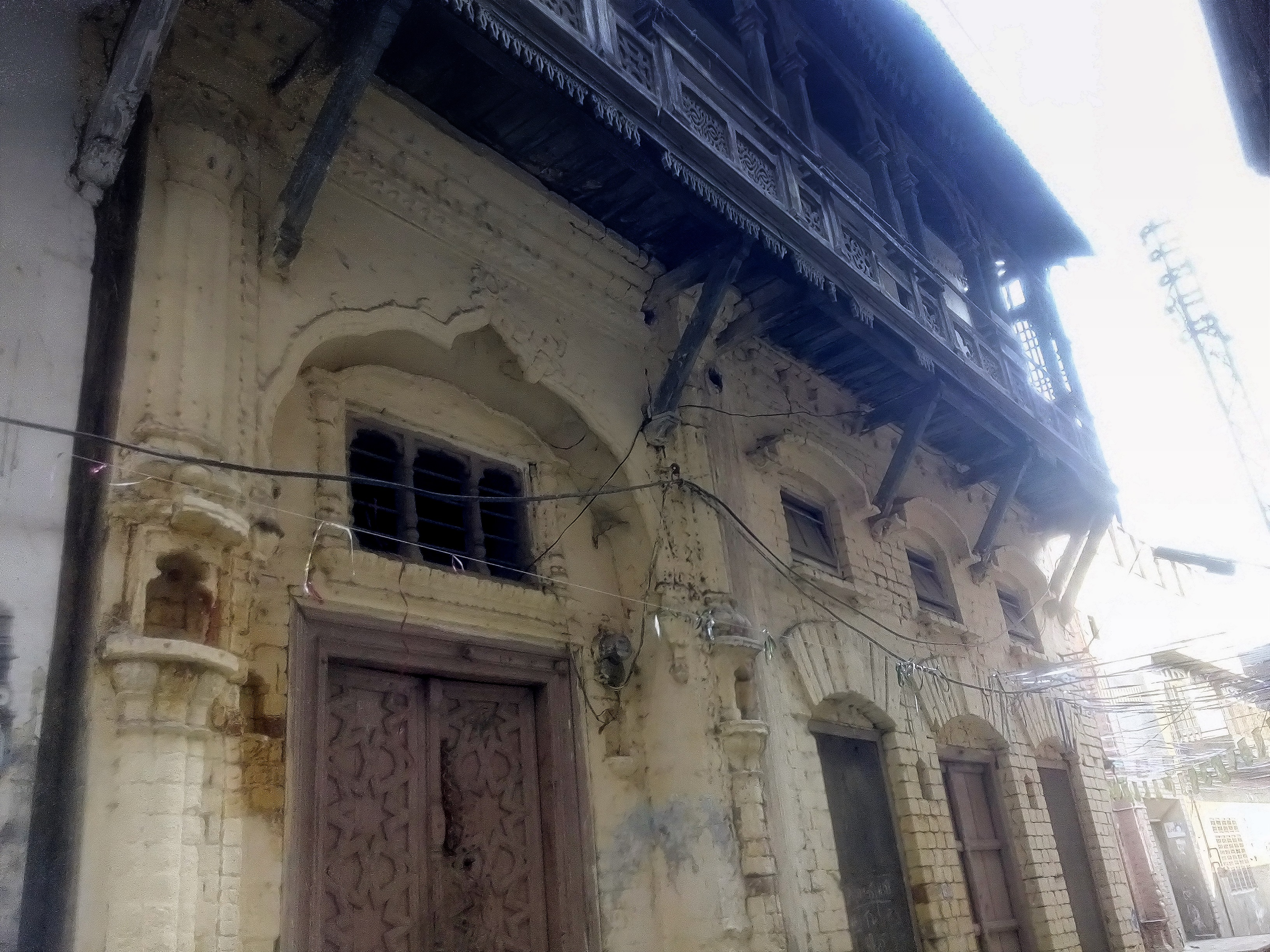

- Location of Eminabad Eminabad (Pakistan)
- Coordinates: 32°02′32″N 74°15′36″E
- Country: Pakistan
- Province: Punjab
- District: Gujranwala
- Tehsil: Gujranwala City

Area
  - Total: 1.9 sq mi (5 km^{2})

Population
  - Estimate (2017): 150,646
- Time zone: UTC+05:00 (Pakistan Standard Time)
- Postal code type: 52450
- Calling code: 055

Eminabad (Punjabi: ایمن آباد), formerly known as Saidpur, is a town located in the southeast of Gujranwala city, in Punjab province, Pakistan. It is around a dozen kilometers from Gujranwala city. According to the census of 2017, it has a population of 27,460.

== History ==
It is believed that Eminabad was established by Raja Salvahan, Sialkot's Rajput ruler in the 1st century BCE, as Saidpur.

During the 16th century, a period marked by Babur's invasion, the town was sacked in 1521. Hymns by Guru Nanak provide vivid descriptions of the devastation experienced in Saidpur, including his and companion Bhai Mardana's imprisonment with the town's populace. After an influential meeting with Guru Nanak, Babur was so inspired by his spirituality that he released all of the prisoners from Saidpur. Post this event, Sikh folklore notes that Guru Nanak and Bhai Lalo resided at a heap of broken pebbles, a location known as Rori Sahib, situated on the outskirts of present-day Eminabad.

Following Saidpur's demolition, Sher Shah Suri founded a new city, Shergarh. However, it was Emin or Ameen Beig, Humayun's general, who destroyed Sher Shah Suri's garrison and established a new town named after himself during Akbar's reign.

In 1610, English merchant, William Finch, noted Eminabad as a thriving city. For the next century, its prosperity continued, bolstered by fertile lands, strategic location, and the protective Mughal Empire. Eminabad also served as the Parganah headquarters in the Lahore governorate, generating 900,000 rupees in revenue.

However, the Mughal Empire's administrative weakness post-Aurangzeb encouraged anti-state insurgencies, including Sikh groups in Punjab. After Diwan Jaspat Rai of Eminabad was killed by Sikh bandits in 1738, his brother Lakhpat Rai retaliated, capturing numerous outlaws and executing them outside Delhi Gate in Lahore, known as Shahid Ganj.

By the late 18th century, the waning Mughal administration struggled to thwart rebel activities and invasions. This period witnessed frequent assaults on Shah Alam II's reign, notably from Ahmed Shah Abdali, Marathas, Hindu Jats of Bharatpur, and the Sikhs.

In 1760, Charat Singh, Ranjit Singh's grandfather, took control of Eminabad. Later, under Ranjit Singh's rule, Dhyan Singh from Jammu was awarded the town. Over three centuries, the town transformed from Saidpur to Shergarh to Eminabad, blossoming into a thriving hub of wealth and power by the late 19th century.

In 1880, a railway line connecting Lahore and Rawalpindi, revolutionized Eminabad's transport system, expanding access to business and employment opportunities in Lahore, the closest major city.

== Demographics ==
Eminabad's Hindu population held greater wealth, operating large businesses across the country and holding superior state institution roles, especially in Jammu and Kashmir.

== See also ==
- Eminabad railway station
