= Baba Deep Singh =

Sikh martyr (1682–1757)

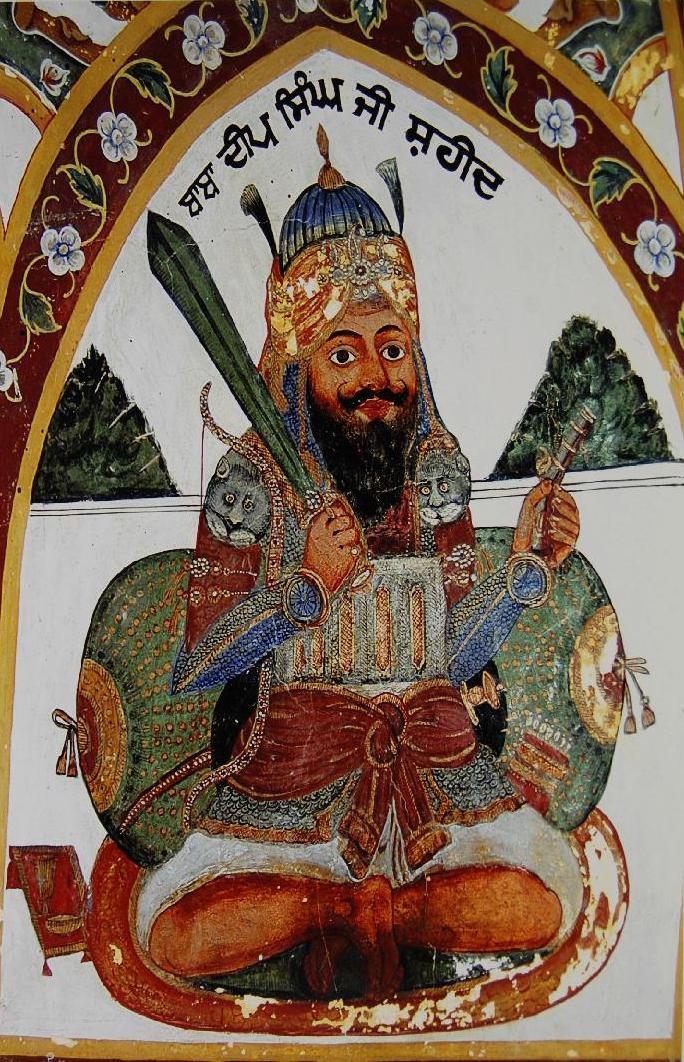
- 19th century fresco painting of Baba Deep Singh from Gurdwara Baba Atal, Amritsar

Jathedar of Takht Sri Damdama Sahib
- In office 1706–1757
- Preceded by: Position Established
- Succeeded by: Sudh Singh

Jathedar of Damdami Taksal
- In office 1708–1757
- Preceded by: Position Established
- Succeeded by: Baba Gurbaksh Singh

Personal details
- Born: 26 January 1682 Pahuwind, Tarn Taran, Punjab, Mughal Empire
- Died: 13 November 1757 (aged 75) Golden Temple, Amritsar
- Cause of death: Killed in Action
- Known for: First Head of Shaheedan Misl; First Head of Damdami Taksal; Fighting alongside most of battles of Banda Singh Bahadur like Battle of Chapar Chiri, Sadhaura and capture of Sirhind; Freed the captives during the fourth raid of Ahmad Shah Durrani in 1757; Battle of Amritsar (1757)

Military service
- Commander: Dal Khalsa

Baba Deep Singh (26 January 1682 – 13 November 1757) is revered among Sikhs as one of the most hallowed martyrs in Sikhism. He is remembered for his sacrifice and devotion to the teachings of the Sikh Gurus. Baba Deep Singh was the first head of Misl Shaheedan Tarna Dal – an order of the Khalsa military established by Nawab Kapur Singh, the then head of Sharomani Panth Akali Buddha Dal. The Damdami Taksal also state that he was the first head of their order. He is remembered by Sikhs as one of their notable martyrs of the 18th century. He is one of two Sikh individuals who have a teġ vāhī shrine at the Golden Temple complex commemorating their martyrdom, the other being Baba Gurbaksh Singh. Deep Singh was one of three Sikhs of the 18th century who are believed to restored the Dasam Granth via gathering scattered writings, the other two namely being Mani Singh and Sukha Singh of Patna.

== Early life ==
Baba Deep Singh was born in a Sandhu Jat Sikh family on 26 January 1682. His father Bhagta was a Farmer, and his mother was Jioni. He lived in the Pahuwind village of Amritsar district.

He went to Anandpur Sahib on the day of Vaisakhi in 1700, where he was baptised into Khalsa by Guru Gobind Singh, through the Khande di Pahul or Amrit Sanchar (ceremonial initiation into Khalsa). As a youth, he spent considerable time in close companionship of Guru Gobind Singh, learning weaponry, riding and other martial skills. From Bhai Mani Singh, he learnt reading and writing Gurmukhi and the interpretation of the Gurus' words. After spending two years at Anandpur, he returned to his village in 1702, before he was summoned by Guru Gobind Singh at Talwandi Sabo in 1705, where he helped Bhai Mani Singh in making copies of the scripture Guru Granth Sahib.

== Military career ==
In 1709, Baba Deep Singh joined Banda Singh Bahadur during the Battle of Sadhaura and the Battle of Chappar Chiri. In 1733, Nawab Kapur Singh appointed him a leader of an armed squad (jatha). On the Vaisakhi of 1748, at the meeting of the Sarbat Khalsa in Amritsar, the 65 jathas of the Dal Khalsa were reorganized into twelve Misls. Baba Deep Singh was entrusted with the leadership of the Shaheed Misl.

With the invasion of India by Nadir Shah between January–May 1739 and the total destruction of the Mughal administration in the Punjab as a result, the Sikhs saw an opportunity for themselves and pillaged and sought revenge on their enemies. According to the contemporary writer Harcharan Das in his Chahár Gulzár Shujá'í, in 1740, one year after the attack of Nader Shah, a large force of Sikhs and Jats, including local Muslims, seized the Sirhind sarkar of the Jullunder Doab, establishing a short-lived polity with a person named Daranat Shah as its head. The rebellion was eventually crushed by a Mughal force in 1741 under Azimullah Khan and the Sikhs retreated to the Lakhi Jungle. According to Hari Ram Gupta, Daranat Shah was Baba Deep Singh.

=== Demolition of the Harmandir Sahib ===
In April 1757, Ahmad Shah Durrani raided Northern India for the fourth time. While he was on his way back to Kabul from Delhi with young men and women as captives, the Sikhs made a plan to relieve him of the valuables and free the captives. The squad of Baba Deep Singh was deployed near Kurukshetra. His squad freed a large number of prisoners and raided Durrani's considerable treasury. On his arrival in Lahore, Durrani, embittered by his loss, ordered the demolition of the Harmandir Sahib (the "Golden Gurudwara"). The shrine was blown up and the sacred pool filled with the entrails of slaughtered animals. Durrani assigned the Punjab region to his son, Prince Timur Shah, and left him a force of ten thousand men under General Jahan Khan.

Baba Deep Singh, 75 years old, felt that it was up to him to atone for the sin of having let the Afghans desecrate the shrine. He emerged from scholastic retirement and declared to a congregation at Damdama Sahib that he intended to rebuild the temple. Five hundred men came forward to go with him. Baba Deep Singh offered prayers before starting for Amritsar: "May my head fall at the Darbar Sahib." As he went from hamlet to hamlet, many villagers joined him. By the time baba Deep Singh reached Tarn Taran Sahib, ten miles from Amritsar, over five thousand Sikhs armed with hatchets, swords, and spears accompanied him.

== Death ==
Baba Deep Singh had vowed to avenge the desecration of the Golden Temple by the Afghan army. In 1757, he led an army to defend the Golden Temple. The Sikhs and the Afghans clashed in the Battle of Amritsar on 13 November 1757, and in the ensuing conflict Baba Deep Singh was decapitated.

There are two accounts of Baba Deep Singh's death. According to one popular version, Baba Deep Singh continued to fight after having been completely decapitated, slaying his enemies with his head in one hand and his sword in the other. In this version, only upon reaching the sacred city of Amritsar did he stop and finally die. According to the second version, he was mortally wounded with a blow to the neck, but not completely decapitated. After receiving this blow, a Sikh reminded Baba Deep Singh, "You had resolved to reach the periphery of the pool." On hearing the talk of the Sikh, he held his head with his left hand and removing the enemies from his way with the strokes of his 15 kg (33 lb) Khanda "with his right hand, reached the periphery of Harmandir Sahib where he breathed his last. The Singhs celebrated the Bandhi-Sor Divas of 1757 A.D. in Harmandir Sahib".

The Sikhs recovered their prestige by defeating the Afghan army and the latter were forced to flee.

== Legacy ==
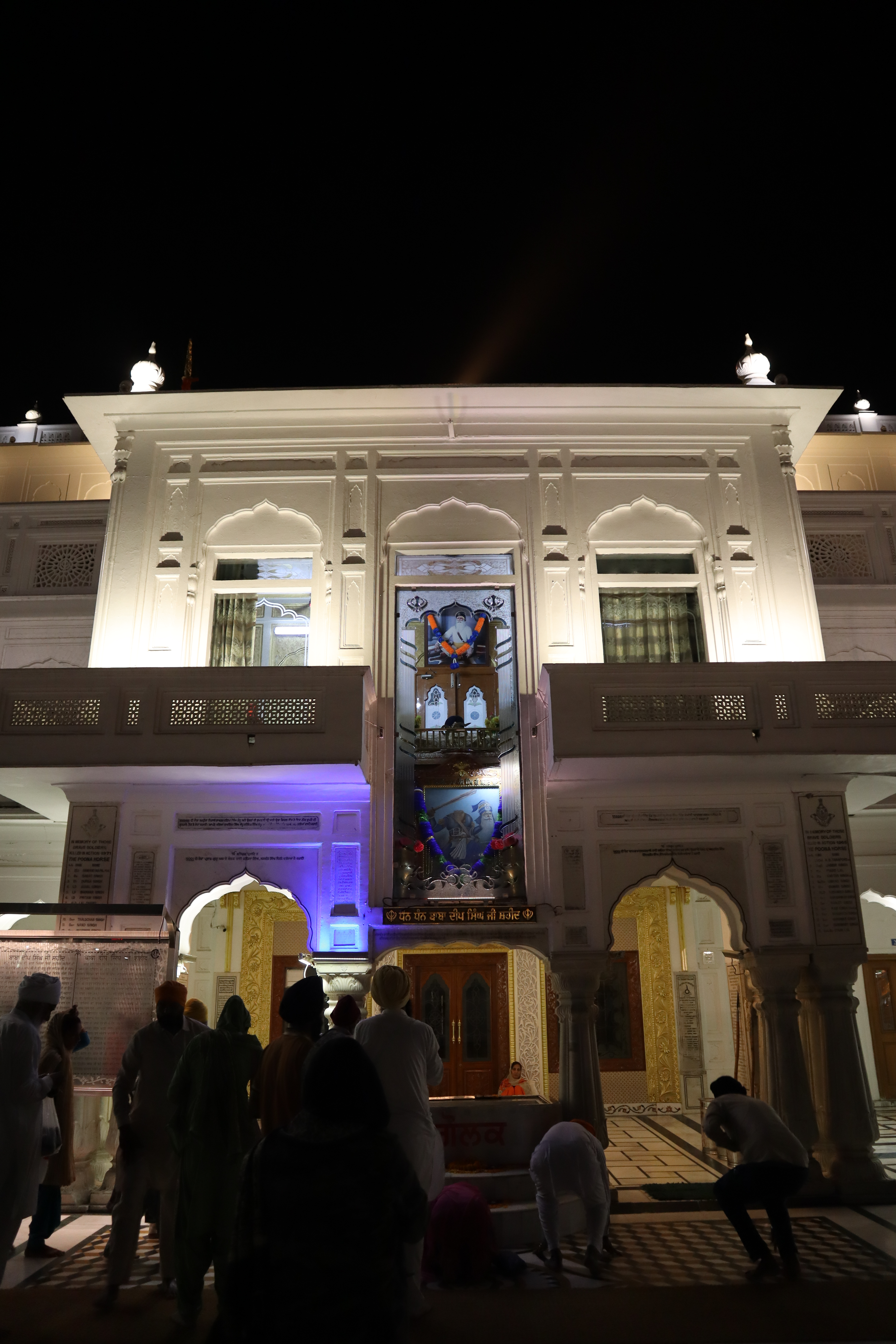
Photograph of Gurdwara Sri Baba Deep Singh Shaheed within the Golden Temple complex, Amritsar, Punjab, India, April 2023

The spot where Baba Deep Singh's head fell is marked in the Golden Temple complex, and Sikhs from around the world pay their respects there. Baba Deep Singh's Khanda (double-edged sword), which he used in his final battle, is still preserved at Akal Takht, first of the five centers of temporal Sikh authority.

== Battles fought by Baba Deep Singh ==
- Battle of Sadhaura (1710)
- Battle of Chappar Chiri (1710)
- Siege of Sirhind (1710)
- Battle of Amritsar (1757)

== In popular culture ==
Anokhe Amar Shaheed Baba Deep Singh Ji, an Indian historical biographical film by Jaswinder Chahal was released in 2006.

== Gallery ==
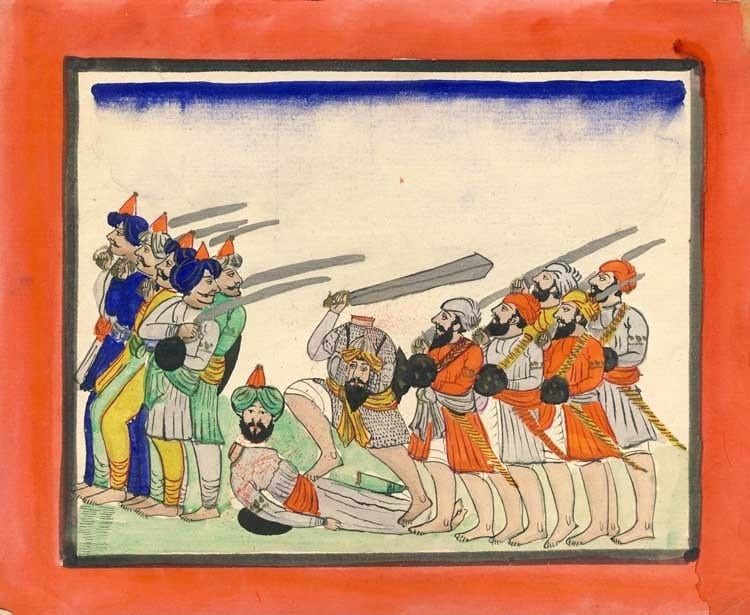
A watercolour painting depicting a headless Baba Deep Singh and fellow Sikh warriors shown fighting the hostile Afghan forces at the Battle of Amritsar (1757), circa 1880's

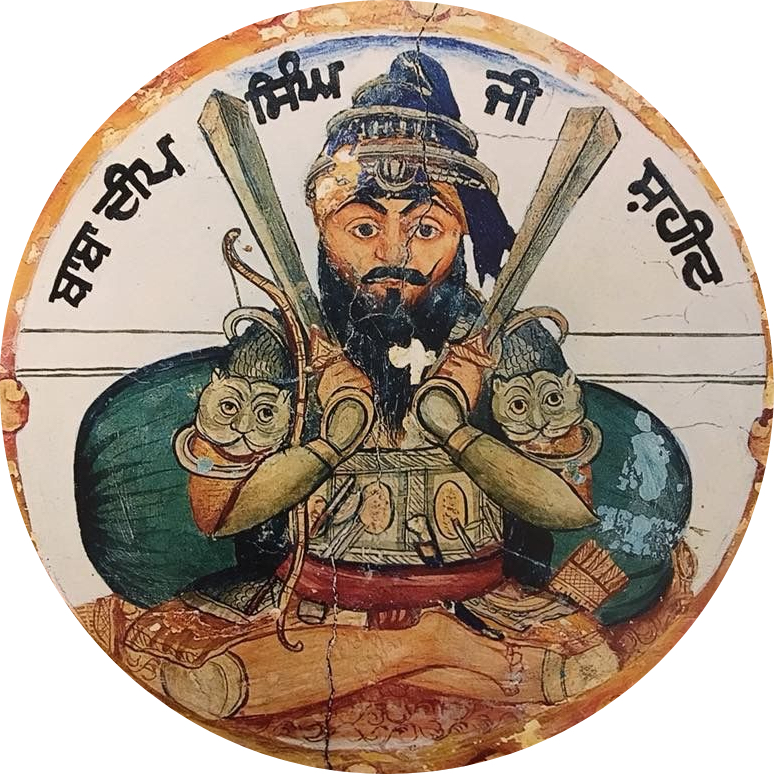
Fresco of Deep Singh from Gurdwara Baba Atal

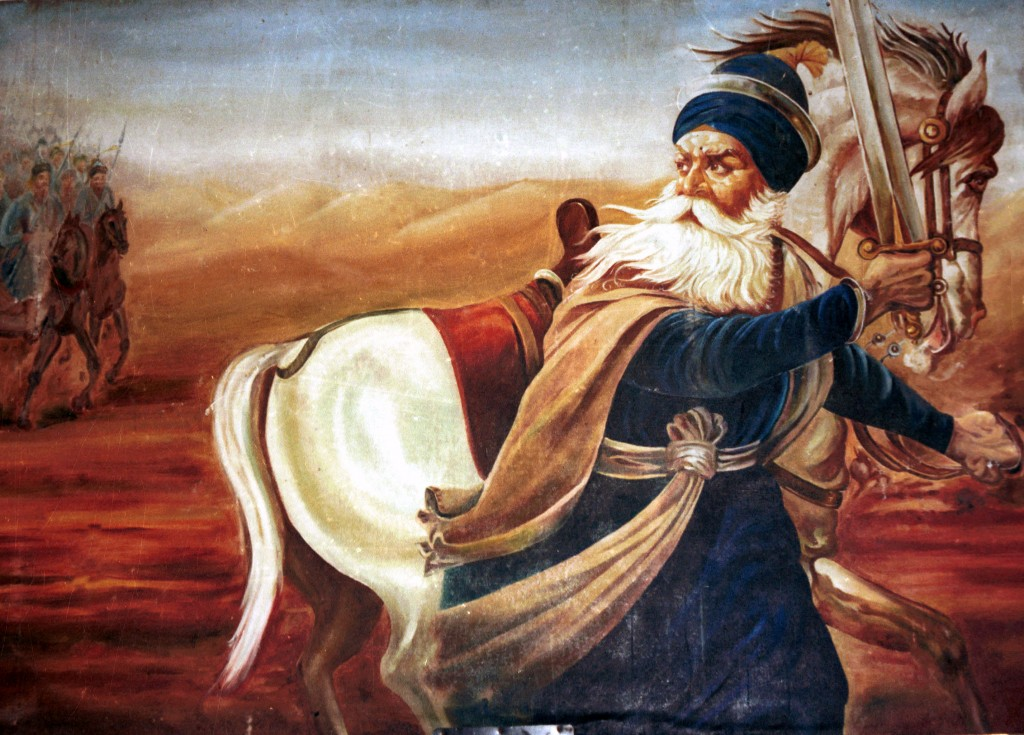
Akali Baba Deep Singh leading his men against the Afghans. Early 20th century Sikh painting

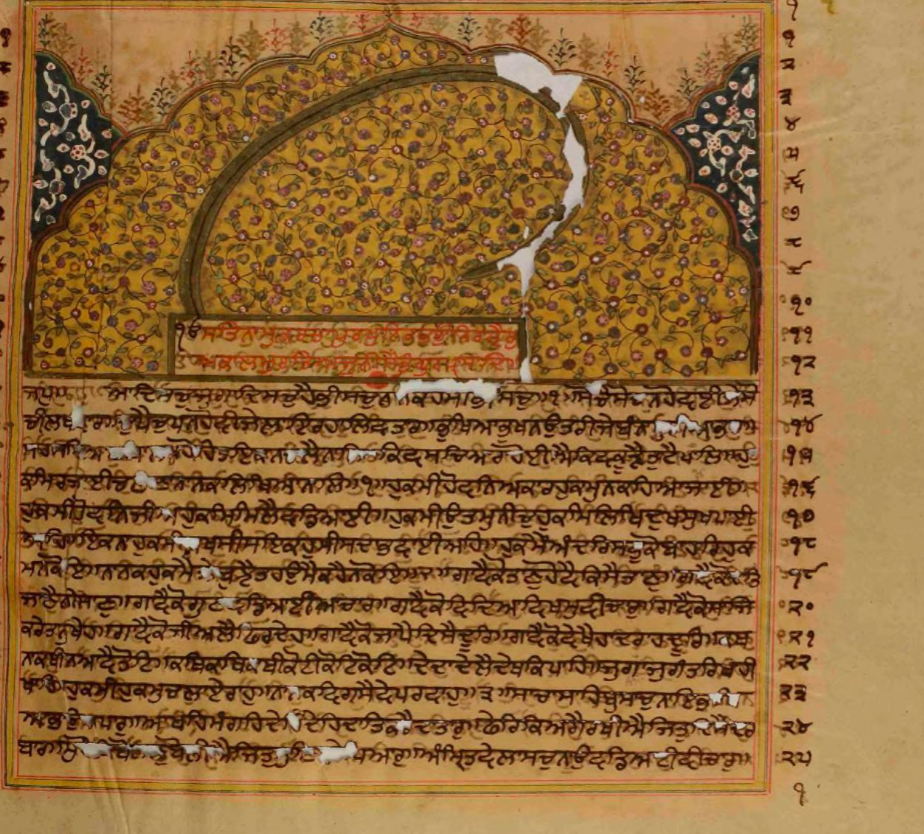
Opening folio of a Guru Granth Sahib manuscript authored by Baba Deep Singh, currently located in Patna Sahib

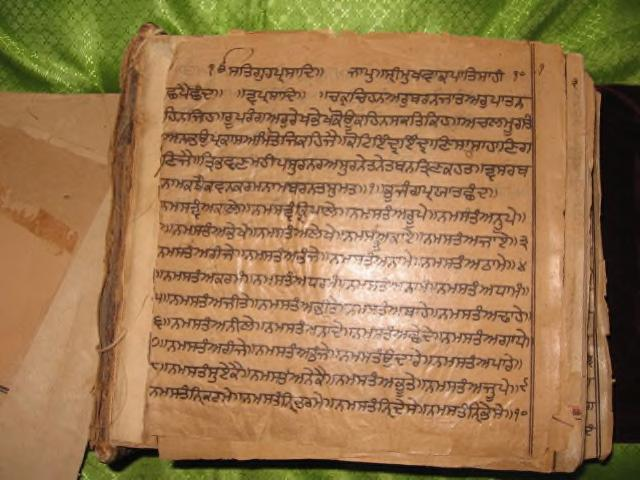
Opening folio of a Dasam Granth manuscript authored by Baba Deep Singh

== See also ==
- Martyrdom in Sikhism
