= Jaspat Rai =

Mughal official (died 1746)

Jaspat Rai (died early 1746) was a minister of the Mughal court, initially holding the position of the faujdar of Jalandhar and later appointed as faujdar of Eminabad by Zakariya Khan Bahadur. Jaspat was a native of Kalanaur and was a wealthy jagirdar. He had assisted his brother, Lakhpat Rai, in getting re-instated to his position in the Mughal administration after he had been arrested for failure to discharge the dues of the army. In the Mughal administration, Jaspat Rai held the responsibility of checking the accounts of the court officials. In early 1746, he was killed in an encounter with Sikh warriors under Jassa Singh Ahluwalia. During a clash against Sikhs at a patch of jungle near Baddoki Gosaian, a Rangreta Sikh named Nibahu Singh leapt on the elephant Jaspat Rai was riding and beheaded him with his sword. The religious teacher of Jaspat Rai, Bawa Kirpa Ram Gosain of Baddoki, paid a fee of five-hundred rupees to secure Jaspat Rai's head and cremated it. A samadhi was constructed at the site by Jaspat Rai's brother, Lakhpat Rai, who was driven to vengeance against the Sikhs after his brother's killing.

== See also ==
- Lakhpat Rai
