= Battle of Mahilpur (1757) =

Durrani-Sikh battle in 1758

- Part of Indian campaign of Ahmad Shah Durrani, Reconquest of North India (1757–1758) and Afghan–Sikh Wars
Date	December, 1757
Location	Mahilpur, Punjab, Durrani Empire (Modern day India)
Result	Sikh-Adina Beg victory

Belligerents
Sikh Misls; Adina Beg	Durrani Empire

Commanders and leaders
Jassa Singh Ahluwalia; Baghel Singh; Vadbhag Singh Sodhi; Karam Singh; Adina Beg; Khwaja Mirza Khan; Sadiq Beg Khan; Raja Bhup Singh	Murad Khan; Buland Khan †; Sarfraz Khan

Strength
25,000 including Sikhs	25,000

The Battle of Mahilpur was fought between the combined forces of Adina Beg Khan and Sikh Misls and the Durrani Empire in December 1757. Following the fourth invasion of Ahmad Shah Durrani, he had appointed Timur Shah as the viceroy of Punjab with Jahan Khan as his deputy. The Afghans appointed Adina Beg Khan as the faujdar of the Jalandhar Doab and exempted him from attending court at Lahore, on the condition that Adina Beg would pay revenue to the Afghan government. Soon a dispute regarding the payment of revenue occurred between Adina Beg and the Afghans. This dispute escalated which resulted in Jahan Khan sending an Afghan force to arrest Adina Beg. Adina Beg formed a military alliance with the Sikhs under the command of Jassa Singh Ahluwalia and Vadbhag Singh Sodhi. Adina Beg also gained the support of Mughal noblemen Sadiq Beg Khan, Khwaja Mirza Khan, and Raja Bhup Singh. Adina Beg along with the Sikh forces fought the Afghans at Mahilpur. The battle resulted in a victory for Adina Beg and the Sikhs and resulted in the entire Jalandhar Doab being occupied and sacked by the Sikh forces.

== Background ==
After Ahmad Shah Durrani's fourth invasion of India, he appointed his son Timur Shah Durrani as viceroy of Punjab and Jahan Khan as his deputy in May 1757. Mughlani Begum was disappointed to hear the news of Timur Shah being appointed governor of Lahore as Ahmad Shah had previously promised to reconsolidate her power over Punjab.

The Afghans sent a letter to Adina Beg Khan demanding that he present himself to the Afghan court in Lahore, and saying that if he did not comply, the entire Doaba region would be laid to waste. Adina Beg agreed to pay revenue to the Afghans as long as he was exempt from attending court at Lahore. Adina Beg was soon appointed Faujdar of the Jalandhar Doaba by the Afghan government and had to pay an annual tribute to the Afghans. Adina Beg also sent his Hindu agent Dila Ram to Lahore on his behalf and to ensure that revenue was received to the Afghans.

However, soon a dispute over the payment of revenue occurred between the Afghans and Adina Beg. Timur Shah was now looking to extort more revenue from Adina Beg and he asked Adina Beg to present himself in Lahore. Adina Beg however learned of the intentions of Timur Shah and refused to present himself. Not receiving any satisfactory reply from Adina Beg, Jahan Khan had Dila Ram imprisoned. However, Mughlani Begum was able to successfully free Dila Ram from the Afghans. When Jahan Khan learned of this, he proceeded to beat the Begum and her residence was ransacked. Adina Beg wrote to Timur Shah and apologized saying that the reason why he could not present himself to Lahore was because if he left the Doaba then the Sikhs would take the opportunity to take over the entire Doaba region during his absence. Adina Beg also sent agents to Lahore on his behalf which included Dharamdas Taranjia, Jodha Nagri, and Rai Ibrahim Bhatti of Kapurthala. Timur Shah was willing to pardon Adina Beg but still insisted he attend court at Lahore.

Jahan Khan then began military preparations to arrest Adina Beg.Hearing news of the military preparations, Adina Beg fled towards the Shivalik hills.

== Battle ==
Adina Beg Khan was able to make a military alliance with the Sikhs in the Shivalik Hills under the leadership of Jassa Singh Ahluwalia, Vadbhag Singh Sodhi and Baghel Singh. The Sikhs were angry towards the Afghans due to their destruction of Shri Harmandir Sahib in 1757 as well as the massacre of the Hindu and Sikh population in the town of Kartarpur.

Khwaja Mirza Khan also had a falling out with the Afghan government, and also joined Adina Beg. Adina Beg was also able to gain the support of Sadiq Beg Khan the deputy governor of Sirhind and Raja Bhup Singh who commanded an army between 5,000 and 25,000 strong.

Jahan Khan sent an Afghan force under the command of Murad Khan. He, along with Sarfraz Khan and Buland Khan, commanded an army numbering 25,000. The Afghans fought Adina Beg's forces at Mahilpur, close to Hoshiarpur.

Adina Beg ordered his Muslim soldiers to put blades of grass on their heads to distinguish themselves from the Afghans. Karam Singh who belonged to the battalion of Shyam Singh, showed great bravery in the battle against the Afghan forces. Despite the Afghans having light artillery, the Afghan forces were routed by the Sikhs and Adina Beg's forces and the Afghan camp was plundered. Buland Khan, one of the Afghan commanders, was killed during the battle.

== Aftermath ==
After defeating the Afghan forces in Mahilpur, the Sikhs and Adina Beg's forces attacked the city of Jalandhar. Sa'adat Khan Afridi was defeated at Jalandhar and forced to flee.

The city of Jalandhar was home to Nasir Ali, who had previously ordered the Afghan forces to destroy Kartarpur. Vadbhag Singh Sodhi, who was previously the local leader of Kartarpur, ordered the entire city of Jalandhar to be destroyed, with most of its Muslim inhabitants being massacred and the tomb of Nasir Ali was defiled with pork flesh.

The Sikhs soon started extracting tribute in the Doaba and another Afghan force numbering 20,000 to 25,000 under the leadership of Khwajah Abed Khan was defeated by the Sikhs. Adina Beg however invited the Marathas under the command of Raghunath Rao to counter their influence, resulting in expansion of Maratha influence further into Northwestern India.

== See also ==
- Battle of Amritsar (1757)
- Battle of Manupur

== Sources ==
- Gupta, Hari (2007), History of the Sikhs volume II Evolution of the Sikh confederacies (1707-1769), Munshiram Manoharlal Publishers Pvt. Ltd., pp 137–141 ISBN 81-215-0248-9.
- Gupta, Hari (1944), Studies In Later Mughal History Of The Punjab 1707 To 1793, The Minerva Book Shop, pp. 86–137
- Singh, Ganda (1959), Ahmad Shah Durrani Father Of Modern Afghanistan, Asia Publishing House, pp. 190–200
