= Reconquest of North India (1757–1758) =

Recovery of North India by the Indian coalition

- Part of Indian campaign of Ahmad Shah Durrani
- The three leading commanders of the coalition: Raghunath Rao, Adina Beg Khan and Jassa Singh Ahluwalia
Date	17 June 1757 – Summer 1758
Location	Punjab, Sindh, Kashmir, Balochistan and Pakhtunkhwa
Result	Coalition victory: Adina Beg Khan named the Nawab of Punjab; The Maratha Empire reaches its territorial extent; Control of Mughal Empire in North India diminishes entirely except Old Delhi; Consolidation of the Sikh Confederacy and the Kingdom of Kashmir
Territorial changes	All land up to the city of Peshawar occupied from the Durrani Empire

Belligerents
Coalition: Maratha Empire; Mughal Empire; Sikh Confederacy; Other kingdoms: Kingdom of Kashmir	Durrani Empire; Kingdom of Rohilkhand

Commanders and leaders
Raghunath Rao; Malhar Rao Holkar; Adina Beg Khan; Imad-ul-Mulk; Jassa Singh Ahluwalia; Vadbhag Singh Sodhi; Sukh Jiwan Mal	Timur Khan Abdali; Jahan Khan Popalzai; Najib ad-Dawlah

Strength
Maratha Empire: 40,000–50,000 infantry, cavalry and artillery Adina Beg Khan: 10,000 infantry and cavalry Sikh Confederacy: 15,000 troops Kingdom of Kashmir: 10,000 troops	Durrani Empire: 15,000–25,000 infantry and cavalry Kingdom of Rohilkhand: 7,500 infantry and heavy artillery

Following the end of Ahmad Shah Durrani's fourth invasion and his departure from the Indian subcontinent, three lead figures in the north: Adina Beg Khan, who led the remnants of the Mughal Empire in Punjab; Jassa Singh Ahluwalia, the supreme leader of the Sikh misls; and the Maratha leader Raghunath Rao with an army from the south, joined hands for the reconquest of North India then held by the Afghan Durrani Empire and its ally, the Kingdom of Rohilkhand.

The recapture started with the invasion of Agra and Delhi in May 1757 and advanced through the Punjab, overwhelming the outnumbered Afghan forces led by Timur Shah Abdali and Jahan Khan, eventually ending in their expulsion from the Punjab in April 1758.

The coalition victory was short-lived, however, with Ahmad Shah returning in his fifth invasion of India, which saw the Punjab annexed by the Durranis and the Marathas decisively defeated at the Third Battle of Panipat.

== Background ==
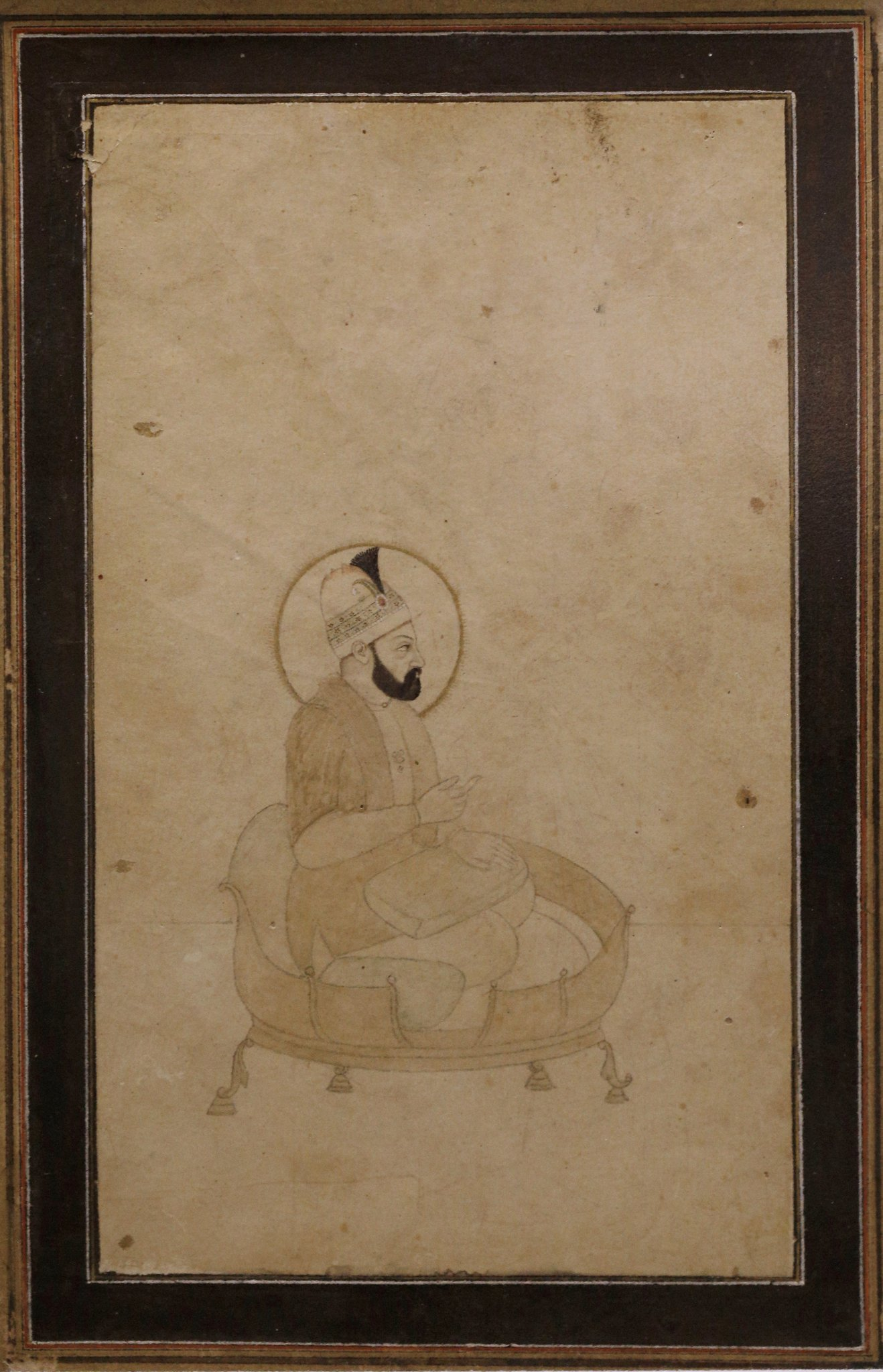
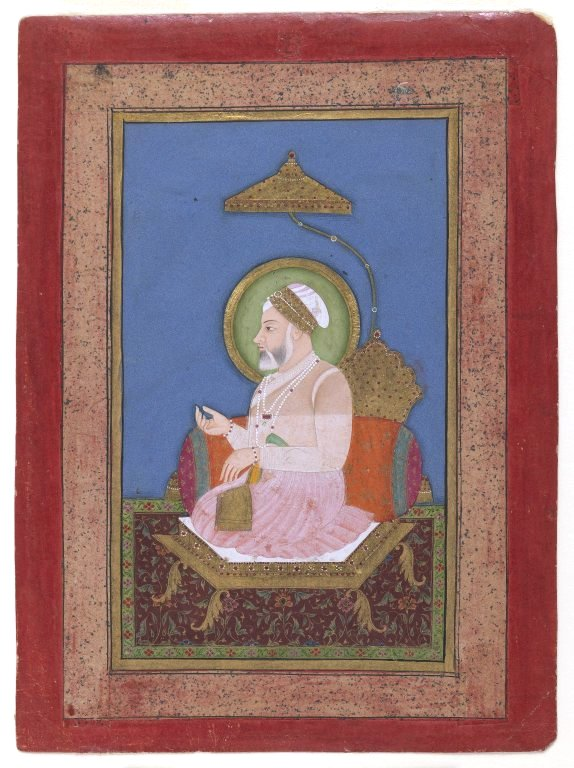
Ahmad Shah Durrani (left) plundered Delhi, the seat of Alamgir II (right), during the Sack of Delhi (1757)

Ahmad Shah Durrani launched his fourth invasion of India in November 1756. Advancing from Afghanistan, his forces moved through Punjab, where they encountered resistance. The Afghan army reached Delhi on 28 January 1757, sacking the city and extracting substantial tribute from the Mughal court of Emperor Alamgir II. Durrani's campaign involved widespread plunder and the imposition of heavy taxation on local populace by plundering the cities of Mathura in February and Gokul and Agra in March. He withdrew toward Afghanistan in April 1757, leaving garrisons under his son Timur Khan and his commander-in-chief Jahan Khan to administer the conquered territories.

During the invasion and its immediate aftermath, regional powers faced direct pressures. In Sindh, the newly appointed Ghulam Shah Kalhoro lost local support as Afghan influence favoured his brother Attar Khan, contributing to Ghulam Shah's expulsion and subsequent exile on 7 November 1757. The Khanate of Kalat under Mir Nasir Khan I initially remained loyal to Durrani but later renounced his overlordship for greater autonomy.

In Punjab, Adina Beg Khan, the governor of the Jalandhar Doab, initially accommodated Afghan demands but grew restive as Jahan Khan pressed for more obedience and greater tribute. Adina Beg began recruiting local allies, including Sikh forces under Jassa Singh Ahluwalia, to counter Afghan detachments. Meanwhile, the Maratha Empire, having already expanded its influence in southern and central India, responded to the power vacuum in the north.

== Conquest of the Ganges–Yamuna Doab ==
=== March from Indore to Jaipur ===
The Treaty of Kannauj (Note: Signed between the Grand Vizer of the Mughal Empire Safdar Jang and, Dattaji Rao Scindia and Malhar Rao Holkar of the Maratha Empire) (23 April 1752) proclaimed the Mughal Empire as a protectorate of the Maratha Empire and thus in a state of an invasion was compelled to be protected by the latter. On this pretext, Peshwa Nana Saheb I sent his brother Raghunath Rao, accompanied by commanders like Malhar Rao Holkar to Delhi. The Maratha army, initially numbering 16,000, (Note: 4,000 led by Raghunath Rao and Vitthal Shivdev Vinchurkar, 2,000 led by Malhar Rao Holkar and 10,000 by Shamsher Bahadur I, Naro Shankar Raje Bahadur and Antaji Mankeshwar Gandhe) comprising cavalry and infantry along with artillery and supply trains, left Pune, the seat of the Peshwa, in October 1756 after celebrating Diwali and reached Indore on 14 February 1757.

Two key factors prevented an immediate direct march on Delhi: Ahmad Shah Durrani was still operating in the region with a large force, and the Maratha army itself was critically short on resources, money, and manpower after the long campaign. Raghunath Rao repeatedly wrote to the Peshwa in Pune, requesting reinforcements and funds, but little assistance was forthcoming as the Maratha capital faced its own severe debts. Calling Ahmad Shah "strong" and "difficult to chastise", Raghunath Rao demanded Dattaji Scindia from the Deccan for his aid. Rao's Diwan wrote to Pune;

The month of Phalguna will be over before my contingement, and that of Malhar are mustered. Abdali is a powerful enemy.

— 16 February 1757, Sakhuram Bapu

In one of his letters to the Peshwa, Rao wrote;

I have no money, nor is any loan available. My troops are in debt. Prices here are very high. I am daily getting my food only by sacking the villages.

— 12 July 1757, Raghunath Rao

To address these shortages, Raghunath Rao resorted to raiding neighbouring Rajput territories. In March 1757, his forces extracted a ransom of Rs. 100,000 (Note: As of 2026, 1 Mughal Silver Rupee equals Rs 6,600 or ₹2,800) from Jawad and Rani Khera. In April, they laid siege to Chauth ka Barwara, a stronghold under Maharaja Madho Singh I of Jaipur. By the 12th of April, Raghunath demanded Rs. 400,000 to 500,000 in cash along with the jagir of Ranthambore, Rampura-Bhanpura, Tonk-Toda, and Hinglajgarh (valued at around Rs. 1,400,000). Madho Singh rejected what he considered a humiliating demand and assembled his feudatories by 10 May. At this point, Raghunath had detached approximately 20,000 men under Sakharam Bapu Bokil, Vitthal Vinchurkar, Gangadhar Tatya, Antaji Mankeshwar, and an elite huzurat force toward Agra, leaving himself with only about 13,000 troops against Madho Singh's 17,000.

On 10 July, the two sides reached an agreement. Madho Singh paid Rs. 1,100,000, of which Rs. 600,000 were paid immediately (Rs. 400,000 to Raghunath Rao and Rs. 200,000 to Malhar Rao). This settlement provided much-needed funds and allowed Raghunath Rao to resume the advance.

=== Sakhuram Bapu in the Doab ===
The vanguard led by Naro Shankar coming from Jhansi and Sakharam Bapu coming from Jaipur reached Agra in May, where they extracted dues from Maharaja Suraj Mal of Bharatpur. On 10 June, Raghunath wrote to Najib ad-Dawlah, the Paymaster-General of Delhi, for the payment of the customary chauth but was declined boldly. Upon hearing the arrival of Sakharam in Kasganj after crossing the Yamuna River on 17 June, numerous allies of Najib, including Nawab Ahmad Khan Bangash of Farrukhabad, fled his stronghold along with the agents of Delhi. Sakharam thus took Ganges–Yamuna Doab without any major confrontation with Antaji taking Anupshahar and Sikandrabad on 2 July and the heavily-guarded Meerut on 15 July. Najib's cousin and his Bakhshi, who led 3,000 men at Meerut and 1,000 at Hapur, were defeated thrice.

The lawlessness in the Doab region led to multiple Gurjar and Rajput landlords to encroach and occupy neighbouring towns and villages. Two thousands of such mud-forts, reported by Maratha agents, required a "full-sized army and exhaustless gun-munition." Grand Vizier Imad-ul-Mulk, who had originally called the Maratha for help against Najib, had kept the Diwan Nagar Mal at Anupshahar to form an alliance with the Marathas. At the end of July, Najib sent his brother Afzal Khan and captain Mulla Aman Khan with artillery across the Yamuna to secure the Doab tract but was forced to call them back after four or five days on seeing the Maratha conquest of Doab complete.

== Siege of Delhi ==
East face of the palace of the Red Fort in Delhi which was a major site in the war between the Rohillas and the Marathas.

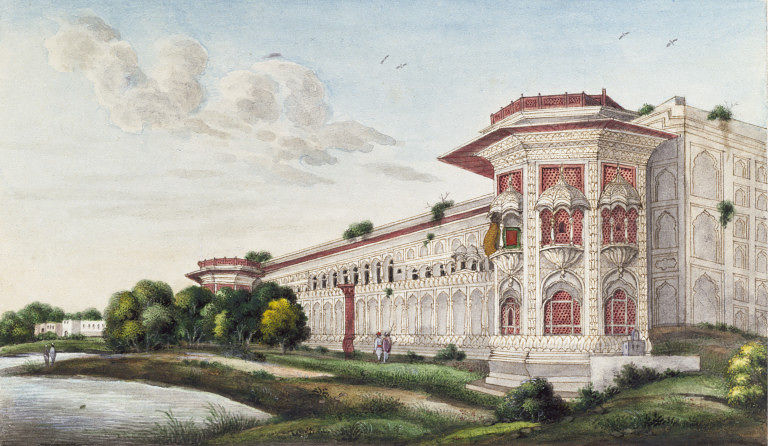
Qudsia Bagh was used as a station for the plantation of artillery and guns.

On 7 June, the Maratha ambassador to Delhi, Bapu Mahadev Hingane, who had fled to Kumher, was called back to Delhi by Imad-ul-Mulk. He received him well and gave him the title Maharajadhiraj (Great King of Kings) on 15 June. Sakharam Bapu and Tatya Gangadhar took post in Patparganj in around 15 July, and Shamsher Bahadur encamped in Rewari on 27 July. Prince Ali Jah (the second son of Alamgir II) was invited to Rewari by Shamsher but was treacherously arrested on 30 July. He also imposed levy on Nawab Kamgar Khan Baloch of Farrukhnagar.

The arrival of the Maratha from all front had shook the Afghans who saw the plundering of the grains from the opposite bank of the Yamuna.

None could come from either bank, and grain in Delhi became very dear.

— 2 August 1757, Najib-ud-Daula

Najib had dug trenches in Khizrabad to bar an invasion but was unsuccessful and concentrated all his forces in the new city. On 21 July, he placed 2,500 men in the Delhi fort under Afzal Khan and Mulla Aman Khan. The artillery was planted below the fort under the walls of Kalani Bagh. Najib sent his agent Meghraj to Imad and Sakhuram on 4 August, proposing terms, but the latter refused and demanded the evacuation of Najib and his forces from the fort. The first skirmish happened at the site of Okhla between the patrols sent by Najib and the foragers of Bapu Hingane on 6 August.

=== First phase ===
Raghunath and Malhar left the Jaipur State at the end of July, crossing Kharwa and Najafgarh Lake on 7 August and reaching Khizrabad just south of Delhi city on 11 August. Joined by Sakhuram and Shamsher, Raghunath divided his army into two divisions. The force sent to Old Fort entered through the Kabuli Gate, slew Bakhtawar Khan, the Qiladar, and resorted to plunder. Narsinghdas Kayath's son bolstered by 200 men of Karam Khan fought the Maratha troops until they were overcome by sheer number and forced to retreat.

The other force attacked the south-east of the city near the garden of Javid Khan. To oppose it, Najib sent the experienced general Mian Qutb Shah with 2,500 Rohilla warriors. Qutb fired at the Marathas from the Blue Bastion instead of meeting them head on. At around 3 p.m., Qutb stopped firing and retired by the permission of Najib to sack the mansion of Imad-ul-Mulk so that he could avenge the death of his men. The "infuriated" Rohillas found the mansion closed shut from inside but barged in through the thatched sheds. Qutb, easily fending off 600 men guarding the mansion, plundered it and dishonoured its inhabitants—ladies and servants—.

Finally, an Afghan noble, Saif-ud-Din Muhammad Khan Kashmiri, with permission from Najib, moved the ladies from the mansion to the vacant house of Diwan Nagar Mal. Imad, cutting all ties with Najib, crossed the eastern side of the city, and joined the Maratha camp in the evening. The next day, the Maratha force approached the river bank again but were fired by Najib's men through the Blue Bastion. The Maratha force retreated at about 3 p.m. ceasing operations for a few days.

Maratha light horse unit under Malhar was sent towards Naraina and Sarai Khwaja Basant in the west of the city. Najib closed all the gates and stationed artillery at each of them. He filled the Tripolia Gates with stones and mud, leaving only a small pathway for traffic and trade. "The grain supply of the city was entirely stopped, and there was a great scarcity of food and consequent suffering. Wheat sold at six seers (Note: One seer equals 933 gram) to a Rupee."

Malhar Rao along with Vitthal Vinchurkar, Bahadur Khan Baloch, and Jamil-ud-Din Khan made ground opposite the Kashmiri Gate while sending Manaji Paygude to entrench opposite the Kabuli Gate where he recruited 4,000 Turk musketeer mercenaries near the suburb of Mughalpura. The main Maratha camp shifted near the Eidgah, which stationed the Imperial Artillery Arsenal (Jinsi Topkhana).

=== Second phase ===
On 25 August, two hours before dawn, the Maratha force accompanied by Bahadur Khan and Nagar Mal entered Qudsia Bagh, planted their guns, and started attacking the Rohillas stationed at the mansions of Jafar Khan and Ali Mardan Khan. The Rohillas retreated inside the walls, and the Qudsia Bagh and Begum Bagh were captured. Bahadur Khan encamped at the garden of Jafar Khan, and Malhar drew closer to the Kashmir Gate. Najib carried his heavy artillery to the northern side and started to fire at the Marathas during the night of 25th and 26th, leaving seven hundred men of Bahadur Khan dead.

Najib, who at that time was left with less than 2,000 men, suspended fight and advocated for peace multiple times to Malhar by sending his agent Meghraj. Malhar's agent, Mujiram Bania, demanded that Najib resign from his post as Mir Bakhshi in favour of Ahmad Khan Bangash, forfeit from the fort to his own jagirs and pay Rs. 5,000,000 to 6,000,000 in indemnity. Najib proposed that he'll pay Rs. 500,000 instead and only accede to these demands if the same is expected from Imad. Criticising the cowardice of Alamgir II, Najib intercepted his letters to Imad and continued negotiating with Malhar.

On the night of the 29th and 30th, renewed attacks began when the Marathas opened fire on all sides of the city. In the south, two bastions of the Delhi Gate were destroyed by Raghunath, while Lahore Gate, in the north-west, was attacked by Imad and extended to the Hayat Bakhsh Bagh, Diwan-i-Khas, Diwan-i-Am, and Toshakhana. Najib's Rohillas retaliated the next day by driving away Imad's men from the Lahore Gate and Bangash from Eidgah; looting tobacco and timber en masse. They then encountered Imad's men in the Turkman Gate, where they killed his Diwan Dilel Singh and captured his banner.

=== Najib ad-Dawlah's surrender ===
Negotiations resumed for the next two days; Najib, low on loyal men and resources due to a large famine, vouched for peace on the advice of Abdul Ahad Khan Majd-ud-Daulah to Malhar who tried to bring Raghunath on the same page. Najib agreed to visit Malhar and accepted any terms set by him;

I am your [adopted] son and I shall act as you bid me. You have done me many favours and it is not proper that you should [now] bare your sword against me. If you say so, I shall go away across the Jamuna, and you can entrust Delhi and the empire to the control of whomsoever you please. Bid me and I shall go to the Abdali Shah and arrange peace between you by delimiting your respective boundaries, which would be respected in future by both parties, so that there might not be war again. I shall depute my son Zabita Khan with a contingent of 5 or 7 thousand men, as a proof of my fidelity, if you do not agree to these terms but are bent on fighting me, I shall unite the Pār Ruhelas and others and give you a good battle. He will rule the whole realm whom God gives the victory.

— 2 September 1757, Najib ad-Dawlah to Malhar Rao Holkar

On the 3rd of September, Malhar invited Najib, who sent Qutb Shah first and then himself went to Malhar's camp in Qudsiabad on a boat at about 3 p.m. where he was welcomed and made to accept all their terms. He returned back to the city the same night and prepared to leave the city. Najib left Dara Shikoh's mansion along with his property and men and went to Wazirabad. Afghan captives were also released by Raghunath, who joined Najib in his tents. Once the Maratha soldiers replaced the Rohilla guards, trade was reopened on Yamuna, and vacant positions were filled by Malhar by the permission of Alamgir II, who had sent robes of honour to make the new appointments.

Imad, who had retaken his previous post as Grand Vizier, made his men the "Qiladar of the palace-fort, superintendent of the Private Audience, Peshkar of the Emperor, and superintendent of the canal." Bangash officially replaced Najib as the Paymaster-General while Antaji Mankeshwar was made the Faujdar of the imperial capital. All the new appointees paid their regards to Raghunath in his tents. The new government of Delhi, which was dominated by the Hindu Marathas, was greatly despised by various Muslim leaders, including Islamic scholar Shah Waliullah Dehlawi, the Nawab of Awadh Shuja-ud-Daula and the Rohillas of Rohilkhand.

On 18 September, Raghunath and Malhar moved from Barari Ghat to the Basi hillocks to release Prince Ali Jah and extract tributes from Musa, the son of Kamgar Khan Baloch. In October, further encroachment into Punjab was temporarily dismissed as the governor of Sirhind, Abdus Samad Khan Muhammadzai, had raised an army and was joined by Zabita Khan in Thanesar. After celebrating Dussehra, the Maratha leaders withdrew their forces from Delhi; Raghunath crossed Yamuna at Khizrabad into the Doab region on 22 October and Hindon River on 26 November where he encamped at the eastern side. On 2 December, he marched to Garhmukteshwar, where he bathed in the Ganges River. The Maratha army then plundered all cities and towns leading to Saharanpur, including Jhunjhana, forcing Najib and his family to retreat across the Ganges.

Malhar, on the other hand, crossed Yamuna at Ramra Ghat, plundered the towns of Karnal and Tilauri, and stopped at Kunjpura, demanding tribute from Najabat Khan who agreed to pay Rs. 300,000 to Malhar, Rs. 100,000 to Bangash and Rs. 50,000 to Dilel Singh. At the end of January 1758, Malhar, along with Bangash, crossed Yamuna back into Saharanpur, where he met Raghunath.

== Conquest of Punjab ==
=== Battle of Amritsar and death of Deep Singh Sandhu ===
Deep Singh Sandhu was beheaded (yet is rumoured to have fought despite losing his head) in Amritsar.

Before leaving India after his fourth campaign, Ahmad Shah Durrani despatched a force from Lahore to Amritsar to deal with the Sikhs (led by Ala Singh Sidhu-Brar and Deep Singh Sandhu) who had plundered the Afghan army numerous times and freed the enslaved women and children. The city of Amritsar was sacked, and the Golden Temple desecrated by pouring entrails of slaughtered cows in the sacred pools; Sikh population of the city was also massacred in great number. In May 1757, Timur Khan and Jahan Khan (who both now held power after Durrani's departure) chased the Sikhs out of their lands into the Himalayan tracts and the Malwa desert. Deep Singh, who was at Damdama Sahib creating a copy of Guru Granth Sahib, vowed to liberate and celebrate Diwali at Amritsar.

He gathered a thousand followers from the villages of Jaga, Bahman, Nahanawala, Banjhoke, Guruchautra, Phul, Mehraj, Daraj, Bhachhu, Govindpura, Kot and Lakhi Jungle and marched into Tarn Taran Sahib where Singh and his followers tied ribbons around their wrists and sprinkled saffron on their turbans. Singh then reached Amritsar, where he was joined by the remaining Sikh militias amassing an army of no less than six thousand. The Sikh army celebrated the festival with great zeal and then prepared for the upcoming battle.

Meanwhile, Jahan Khan was informed of the supposed gathering of the Sikhs and wrote a letter to his general Haji Atai Khan who was away in an expedition with a large number of troops to reach Amritsar on a short notice. Jahan Khan himself mobilized a force of two thousand men, proclaiming Jihad in Lahore by the beat of the drums. He issued "that everybody whether a servant of the State or otherwise, possessing a horse, must follow him to battlefield." (Tahmas Khan Miskin). Thus, Mughlani Begum sent all her 25 servants under Tahmas Khan, and Qasim Khan of Patti joined with his own brigade. The Afghan army numbered around two thousand left Lahore and reached Sarai Khan Khanan (around 20 km away from Lahore) by nightfall.

On 11 November 1757, Jahan Khan and his army reached the village of Gohalwar, and to his surprise, he did not find Atai Khan there. Taking advantage of this situation, the Sikh troops opened fire on the Afghans and besieged them from all sides. the Sikh army was able to overwhelm the Afghans for most part of the battle, which forced the Afghan soldiers to flee but were stopped by Jahan Khan by the might of the sword. It was not until the arrival of Haji Atai Khan, that Jahan Khan was relieved and the tides of the battle were turned.

Deep Singh was severely injured after duelling with one Jamal Shah but was able to kill him before getting himself beheaded by another soldier named Attal Khan. The Sikh troops were massacred, and the Afghans gave chase to the Sikhs as far as Chak Guru. Amritsar was retaken, and all non-Islamic religious sites, mainly Gurdwaras, in the city were destroyed and polluted by Jahan Khan.

In December 1757, two troopers of Jahan Khan were killed in the vicinity of Kartarpur, which was under the spiritual lordship of Vadbhag Singh Sodhi. Jahan Khan sent a force to punish Sodhi, who was beaten severely and was forced to escape at night to a village called Bahiri.

=== Expulsion of Adina Beg Khan from Jalandhar ===
In the autumn of 1757, Adina Beg Khan, the long-serving Nazim of Jalandhar Doab and Faujdar of Sirhind, was given a firman from Timur Khan and a letter from Jahan Khan calling him to the Afghan court in Lahore to pay his services or else he would be chased to the hills and his governorate laid to waste. Timur Khan delivered these messages on the false impression that Adina Beg possessed "property worth lacs." On the advice of Tahmas Khan Miskin, Adina Beg purposefully postponed his reply to Lahore and instead tried to seek help from his previous suzerain and patron Mughlani Begum.

Mughlani Begum herself was deprived of her jagirs which was promised by Ahmad Shah Durrani. She declined an annual allowance of Rs. 30,000 and a residence in Lahore, which was to be granted as compensation. Instead, she lived in a ruined two-room apartment in Sarai Hakim. With no response from Adina Beg, Jahan Khan marched into the Doaba and laid waste to many towns and villages. Adina Beg agreed on undertaking administration under Timur Khan by paying Rs. 3,600,000 annual tribute He was given a khalat to honour the agreement, but his agent Dila Ram was kept as a hostage in Lahore for compliance, and Sirhind was taken from him and given to Abdus Samad Khan Muhammadzai.

In December, a quarrel broke out between Adina Beg and Jahan Khan on the payment of the agreed tribute, and Dila Ram was arrested. On Dila Ram's behalf, Mughlani Begum wrote to Adina asking for funds; she even sent some of her own jewellery to be pawned as tribute. With no response from Adina Beg, Mughlani Begum, taking pity on Dila Ram, freed him and made him escape by nightfall. Jahan Khan, furious by her actions, summoned her to his residence but as the Begum had already retired to the ladies' apartment, he went to her personally and to everyone's surprise, beat her himself with a rod. "The Begum Sahiba saw him there, [he] took up a stick himself, and beat her severely". She surrendered her jewellery of worth Rs. 600,000, and her residence was sacked, including Miskin's belongings. The Begum was thrown in a small room and subjected to physical and mental torture for two consecutive days.

Jahan Khan and Timur Khan summoned Adina Beg to Lahore twice to seek his advice on subduing the Sikhs but he refused to come on the account that his absence would give the Sikhs a chance to occupy his territories and instead sent a delegation (led by Dharamdas Taranjia, Chaudhri Jodha Nagri and Rai Ibrahim Bhatti) with presents to secure their pardon. Jahan Khan even tried to bring Adina Beg's mentor Mirzada Ghulam Hussain to the negotiating table but to no avail. Annoyed by constant refusal on court summoning, Timur Khan detached an army under the governor of Multan, Murad Khan who had reached Lahore on the orders of Ahmad Shah with 10,000 men, to seize Adina Beg from Jalandhar. Adina Beg, along with his troops, had already departed for the innermost part of the Sivalik Hills in Nalagarh leaving his country behind in the hands of the Afghans.

=== Battle of Mahilpur ===
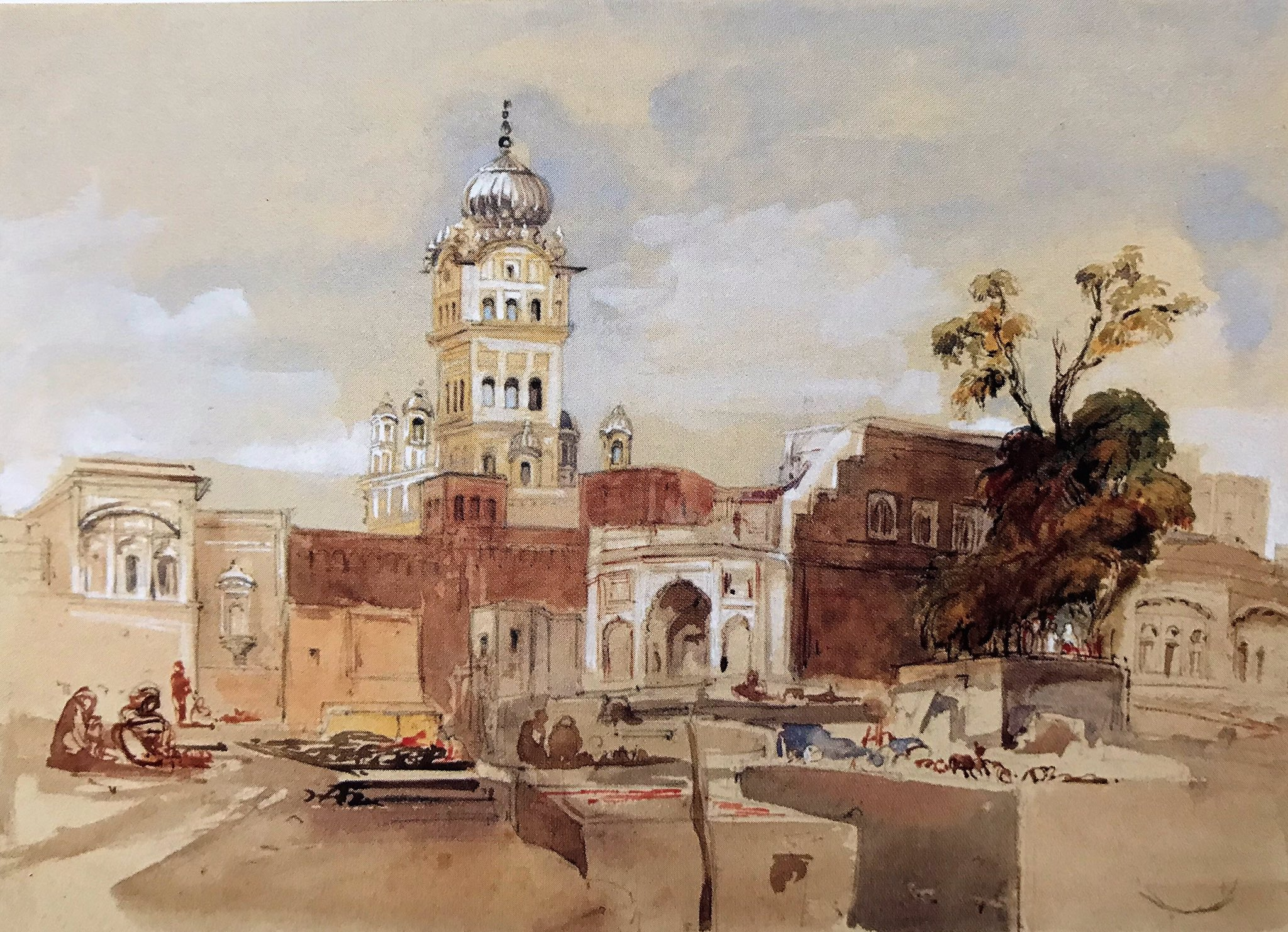
It was the desecration of the Gurdwara Tham Singh in Kartarpur by the Afghan governor Nasir Ali that brought the Sikhs to burn the city of Jalandhar.

Once in the Shivalik Hills, Adina Beg knew that he alone could not face the Afghan army and sought allies. He was joined by Sadiq Beg Khan, his deputy governor at Sirhind and Khwaja Mirza Khan, an attendee of the Afghan court. Another powerful ally the hill chief, Raja Bhup Singh, also joined Adina Beg with 5,000 of his cavaliers. Utilising the hatred the Sikhs harboured for the Afghans, Adina Beg also listed the support of the entire Dal khalsa by convincing key Sikh leaders like Vadbagh Singh Sodhi, Jassa Singh Ahluwalia and, Baghel Singh Dhilon by giving them heavy funds and concessions on loot. The total allied army constituted about 25,000 in number.

Murad Khan, Sarfaraz Khan, and Buland Khan, with 25,000 of their troops, crossed the Beas River and met the allied army at the city of Mahilpur. Sikh troops intoxicated by opium and bhang fell upon the Afghan army under the leadership of Jassa Singh. Karam Singh of Paijgarh from the battalion of Shyam Singh showed great valour throughout the battle. Adina Beg ordered his Muslim soldiery to wear blades of grass on their foreheads to distinguish them from the Afghans. Despite having light artillery, the Afghan forces were defeated by the allied Muslim–Sikh army. Buland Khan was killed, and the Afghan camp was plundered. Murad Khan fled in panic, leaving all his equipment in the hands of the Sikhs.

The victorious Sikhs ravaged all the districts of the Doaba and at last entered the city of Jalandhar where they easily defeated its governor, Sa'adat Khan Afridi, in a skirmish. As promised by Adina Beg, the Sikhs were the first to plunder the city. By the orders of Vadbagh Singh, the entire city, along with the home of Nasir Ali, the person responsible for the massacre of Sikhs in Kartarpur and burning Gurdwara Tham Sahib, was burnt. Nasir Ali's dead body was dragged out of his grave, and his mouth was stuffed with pork. All the mosques in the city were defiled with pig's blood. The Sikhs also massacred Muslim men and children, enslaved the women and forcibly converted them to Sikhism; some even took them away as their wives. At last, Adina Beg came to Jalandhar and paid the Sikhs Rs. 125,000 to retreat from the city. The Sikhs also extracted tribute from the city in the form of Karah Parshad.

Hearing the news of the defeat, Jahan Khan rushed to Batala, where he met Murad Khan in the tank of Shamsher Khan and, out of rage, ordered him to be flogged. He also appointed Sarfaraz Khan as the governor of the Doaba while sending a force under him which was not resisted at first but later defeated. Due to the fear of an invasion by Jahan Khan, Adina Beg, who was low on manpower after the battle, went to his headquarters in the Khali Balwan Hills and let the Sikhs loot all lands upto Lahore. As a result, thousands of Sikhs ransacked and raided the entire region from the Doaba to the neighbourhoods of Lahore each and every night. In the beginning, no one dared to counter the Sikh militias, but later on, before 6 January 1758, the Afghan court sent Khwaja Abed (Ubaidullah) Khan with 20,000 horses and foot soldiers to overcome the Sikhs but was instead defeated and forced to flee. The court had also sent forces under Zafran (Ghufran) Khan to occupy Kashmir but were repulsed by Sukh Jiwan Mal.

=== Siege of Sirhind ===
With the expanding Maratha influence over Delhi and its surrounding areas, Adina Beg on behalf of himself and his Sikh allies, opened negotiations with Raghunath Rao by sending Har Lal and Sadiq Beg proposing an alliance and that he'll pay the Marathas Rs. 100,000 per day when marching and Rs. 50,000 per day when resting. Raghunath readily agreed and made Imad pay half the funds of this expedition.

The city of Sirhind held importance for all three sides; for the Marathas, Sirhind was the last important military garrison before the provincial capitals of Lahore and Multan. For Sikhs, Sirhind was the city where the younger sons of Guru Gobind Singh were executed and also where Banda Singh Bahadur established his government in 1710. Adina Beg was the former governor of Sirhind before being removed from the city which was placed into the hands of Abdus Samad Khan.

Abdus Samad Khan, who was away fighting Ala Singh in Sunam, reached Sirhind back on 12 January 1758 to repair his fort and prepare for the Maratha invasion. Malhar, after extracting Rs. 500,000 in tribute from Kunjpura, turned back. Malhar's women, who were retreating after a religious bath near Thanesar and Kurukshetra, were besieged in Shahabad by an army sent by Abdus Samad Khan. Nonetheless, the Maratha escort was able to fend off the Afghans and reach back safely.

By the end of February, Raghunath and Malhar, along with an army of fifty thousand but rumoured to be around two hundred thousand, left to invade Punjab. By the 5th of March, the Maratha force had reached Mughal-ki-Sarai near Ambala, by the 6th, they reached Rajpura, by 7th Aluen-ki-Sarai Banjara, and on 8th they had come to the neighbourhoods of Sirhind. The next day, Adina Beg and Jassa Singh, with their armies, had also reached and joined the Marathas after crossing the Sutlej River.

The siege of Sirhind started on 9 March from all sides. Unable to fend off the allied troops, Abdus Samad Khan shut himself in the fort. After a few days of fighting, Abdus Samad Khan and Jangbaz Khan fled the city but were wounded and captured shortly afterwards. They were treated well under the protection of Raghunath. The city and the fort fell on 21 March.

The Sikhs were the first to enter the city and resorted to plunder, looting a great share of wealth. The next day, the Marathas entered and looted whatever they could. On the third day, people from the neighbouring towns and villages joined in the loot. All the inhabitants of the city rich or poor were separated from their property; the mansions of the elite, timber, and wood of houses, treasures buried beneath floors, all were looted and confiscated. A conflict started between the Marathas and the Sikhs on the distribution of the war booty, but Adina Beg mediated and established peace. He also proposed that during the march to Lahore, the Sikh army, 15,000 in number, should be two stages ahead of the Maratha army so that no further disagreement occurs.

=== Battle at Sialkot ===
Witnessing great successes by the tripartite alliance, Sukh Jiwan Mal, the Raja of Kashmir, decided to make a name for himself and gathered an army of 10,000 men. He first took the fort of Akhnoor, which was under the jurisdiction of Raja Ranjit Dev of Jammu. He then went and took Bhimber from Raja Sulaiman Khan of Chibhal. The garrison city of Sialkot, just south of Jammu, was governed by an Afghan man known as Yar Khan. Before facing Sukh Jiwan, Yar Khan was bolstered by Ranjit Dev, who had sent his troops to help him against the Kashmiri army. After a long battle, the Jammuite–Afghan army was able to defeat and force Sukh Jiwan back to Srinagar.

=== Fall of Lahore and retreat of the Afghans ===
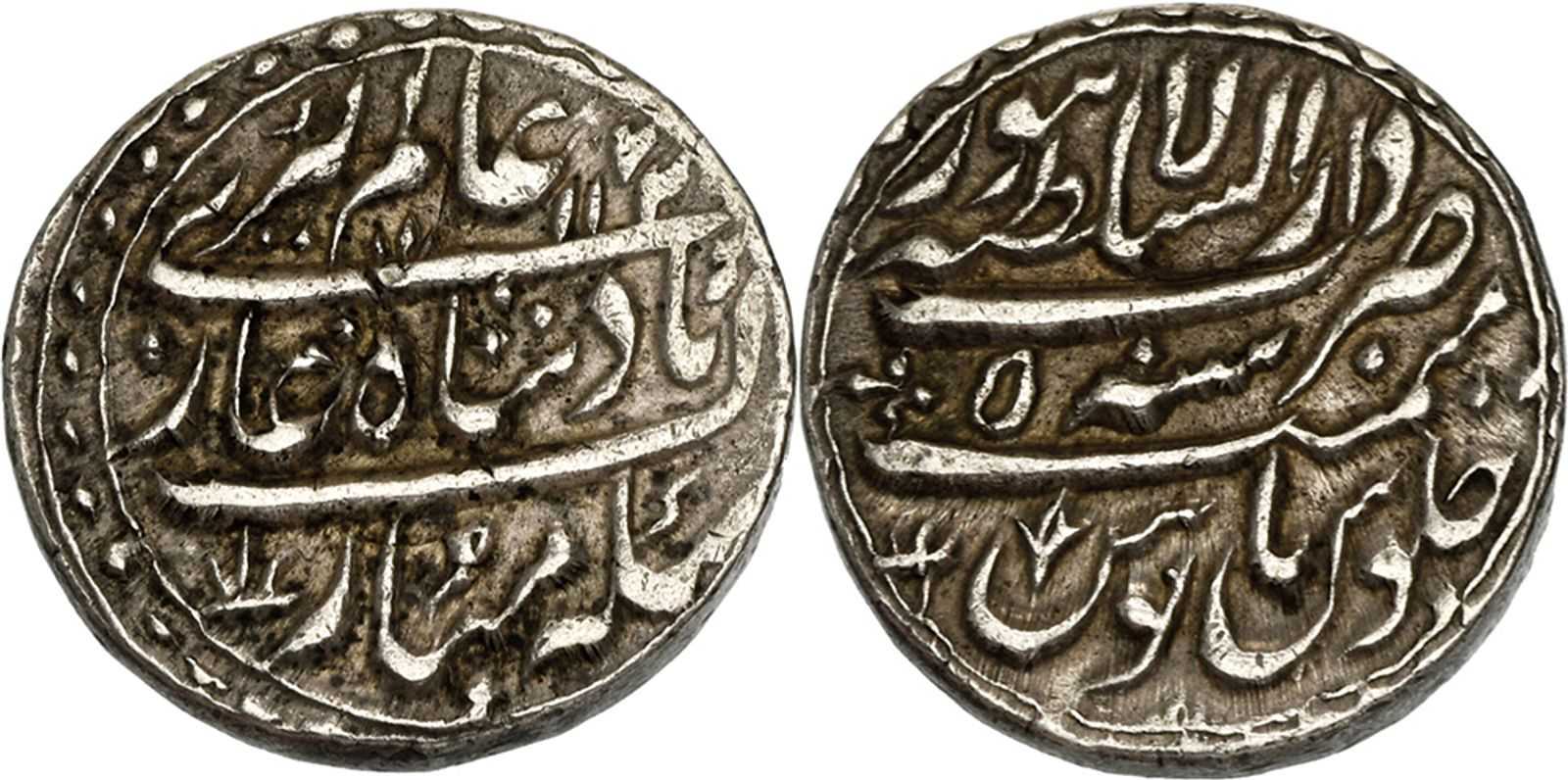
Maratha Confederacy. AR Rupee (22.4mm, 11.36 g, 4h). In the name of 'Alamgir II. Dar al-Sultanat Lahore mint. Dated AH 1172 (AD 1758–9), year 5.

Despite having struck an open alliance with the Marathas, Adina Beg, before or during the siege of Sirhind, secretly wrote to Jahan Khan, assuring him that he's still loyal to the Afghan court, and his alliance with the Marathas was temporary. He also informed Jahan Khan that the Allied army was marching to Lahore with the speed of a 100 kos (300 km) per day. Various Sikh leaders throughout Punjab had joined this expedition, including Charat Singh Sandhawalia of the Sukerchakia Misl, Tara Singh Ghaiba of the Dallewalia Misl, Jassa Singh Ramgarhia of the Ramgarhia Misl, Hari Singh Bhangi, Lehna Singh Bhangi, Gujjar Singh Bhangi, and Jhanda Singh Bhangi of the Bhangi Misl.

Jahan Khan, hearing the defection of Adina Beg, imprisoned Mughlani Begum in Timur Khan's palace and left Lahore with his army, including Tahmas Khan Miskin, who was supervised by four men all the time. After reaching Batala in eight days, he detached 2,000 of his men under the command of Yusaf Khan and made him enter the Doab region to gather intel. After some weeks of scouting, Yusaf Khan learned of the fall of Sirhind, quickly withdrew from the Doab, crossing the Beas at Rahila Ghat in two days, and met Jahan Khan at Batala. He retreated to Jalalabad in eight days, but after hearing that the Allied army had crossed the Sutlej, he went back to Lahore in four days.

On 9 or 17 April, Jahan Khan, left with only 25,000 men, decided to leave Lahore and set up his camp at Shahdara at the opposite side of the Ravi River. He shifted the Afghan ladies, including Timur's mother to the camp first, and then ordered the Durrani officers and soldiers to carry their baggage and property on bullock carts on repeated trips the whole day and night. Tahmas Khan, on the orders of Jahan Khan, forced Mughlani Begum and her daughter Sahibzadi to join the harem of Jahan Khan. Jahan Khan executed some of his soldiers in the chowk who tried to hide in the city.

The Allied vanguard led by Adina Beg and Manaji Paygude encamped five to six kos away (12 to 18 km) from Lahore. Thus, Timur Khan and Jahan Khan made their escape to the camp on the same day, crossing the river by noon, while the baggage left behind was burned to ashes. As the escape was meant to be quick in action, many of the ladies were released from harem, including Mughlani Begum, who went back to Lahore with her daughter.

On 10 or 18 April, the day of Vaisakhi, at about 9 a.m., 500 Maratha and 100 Mughal horsemen under Ashur Ali Khan arrived at the Delhi Gate and showed Tahmas Khan the firman who opened the gate to him. Khwaja Mirza Khan later arrived at the behest of 1,000 Mughal and 10,000 Maratha troops, and after learning that the Afghans had escaped, pursued them across Ravi. Early in the morning of 11/19 April, the Afghan convoy left the camp for Kabul; the rearguard was given to Mir Hazar Khan. Mirza Khan was able to reach and fight Hazar Khan, and after a failed attempt to flee, Hazar Khan was overcome and captured.

At Sarai Kachchi, 36 miles north-west of Lahore, Jahan Khan was caught up by Mirza Khan, but because of Mirza's lack of siege equipment, Jahan was able to slip away during the night. While crossing the Chenab River below Wazirabad, the Allied forces were able to engage with the Durrani procession. All of Timur Khan's army, composed of Uzbek, Qizilbash, and Afghan soldiers along with their baggage, was on the same side as the Allied army, so fell prey to it, which killed many and enslaved the rest. Almost all of Timur Khan's treasures and wealth, which he had accumulated during his tenure, was taken by Adina Beg, the Sikhs and the Marathas. The Sikhs who had enslaved the Afghans took them to Amritsar so that they could clean the Golden Temple and other gurdwaras desecrated by Ahmad Shah and Jahan Khan while the Afghans enslaved by the Mughals joined the army of Mirza Khan.

Many eyewitnesses, including Tahmas Khan, agree on the fact that the Marathas and Sikhs abandoned the chase of the Afghans at Chenab. Raghunath and Adina Beg arrived back in Lahore either on 11 or 19 April. Over the inability to pay the promised tributes, the Marathas, enraged, looted the camps of Adina Beg. Adina Beg erected a platform in the Shalimar Gardens, which was worth of Rs. 100,000 for Raghunath. Fountains of the garden played rosewater, and the whole city was illuminated. Knowing that the Sikhs had no expertise in effective ruling and were too divided to rule the province as a whole, Raghunath appointed Adina Beg as the Nawab of Punjab for an annual tribute of Rs. 7,500,000. Adina Beg appointed Sadiq Beg, the governor of Lahore and Khwaja Said Khan, the brother of Mirza Khan, as his deputy.

On 10 May, Raghunath and Malhar left Lahore for Delhi, leaving behind Maratha brigades under Tukoji Rao Holkar, Khandoji Kadam, Narsoji Pandit, Jankoji Rao Scindia, Sabaji Scindia, and Vitthal Vinchurkar. Raghunath took the Somvati Amavasya bath at Kurukshetra on 5 June. On 14 June, they had reached Sonipat, Buana on 16 June, and Farrukhabad and Rewari on 20 June. Raghunath reached back Pune on the 15th of September where he was hailed a hero.

On 28 April 1758, Tukoji Rao Holkar and Narsoji Pandit crossed the Indus River and took the forts of Attock and Rohtas from the Afghan loyalist Muqarrab Khan Gakhar. They then went on to take Peshawar from its governor by 8 May. Meanwhile, Adina Beg sent his general Salih Muhammad Khan to Multan, who defeated and expelled its governor, Ali Mohammad Khakwani. Thus, Multan and Dera Ghazi Khan came under his direct jurisdiction. Salih Muhammad was appointed the governor of Multan on behalf of Adina Beg. Tukoji was appointed as the guardian of Multan and Dera Ghazi Khan.

== Aftermath ==
Indian subcontinent in the year 1760.

In his letter to the Peshwa, Raghunath Rao claimed that he was contacted by Karim Khan Zand who proposed an alliance against Ahmad Shah in exchange for the provinces of Kabul and Kandahar, once taken from the Afghans. Raghunath declined on the account that the two provinces historically had been a part of India as the Subahs of the Mughal Empire since Emperor Akbar and would not let the Persians take it from them.

Submitted for your consideration. Lahore, Multan, Kashmir, and so on, subahs before Attock, ought to be brought under control. Some have been achieved, and some more are left, which I will soon complete. Ahmed Shah Abdali, his son Taimur Shah, and Jahan Khan, our army chased and looted their armies. With the residual force, with difficulty, Taimur Shah and Jahan Shah reached Peshawar which is beyond Attock....They [the Persians] have sent requests (to me) that they will obey and serve and work to check Abdali. There is pressure and moves against Abdali from all sides. On this account, he has lost control. If he goes to Herat, he will not be able to keep the territory under control. In summary, Abdali has no support from that side. Nobody appears to be succouring him. The patshah of Iran from that side has completely immobilised him. From this side, we should use our force to push our boundary beyond Attock....Malharba and I have received letters from the Iran patshah in his own hand that make haste and come to Qandahar and we will defeat him and agree on the border at Attock. However, I have given the province of Kabul and Qandahar to Abdul Rahim Khan along with some material and some army. The subahs of Attock and Qandahar have been part of Hindusthan from Akbar to Alamgir's time. Why should we give those to Vilayet? Therefore, I am for the present, giving these provinces accordingly. He may not be much concerned about these subahs,he will rule Iran. Enforcing our rule up to Qandahar, I will at present write a sweet letter to him.

— 4 May 1758, Raghunath Rao to Nana Saheb I

After the departure of the Marathas, Adina Beg Khan quickly turned against his former Sikh allies. He increased his forces, hired woodcutters to clear forests used as Sikh refuges, and laid siege to the Sikh fort of Ram Rauni at Amritsar. Before these campaigns could fully succeed, he died of colic at Batala on 15 September 1758, the same day Raghunath Rao reached Pune. His death caused an immediate disorder, causing the Sikhs to take their lands back. The Marathas responded by appointing their own officer, Sabaji Shinde, as governor of Lahore and Peshawar and Bapuji Trimbak, as governor of Multan. Raghunath Rao backed Abdul Rahim Khan, the nephew of Ahmad Shah Durrani, as a claimant to the throne in Kandahar posting him in Peshawar until May 1759.

In Sindh, Mian Ghulam Shah Kalhoro defeated Attar Khan again at the Battle of Ubauro (29 May 1759), consolidated power, and accepted Ahmad Shah Durrani's suzerainty by 1762 who gave him the title Shah Wardi Khan and Samsam al-Dawla. Accordingly, during Ahmad Shah's fifth and sixth invasion, Nasir Khan, complying with the treaty, sent his own army to accompany the Shah. By 1762, Ahmad Shah had conquered much of North India again, including Kashmir, by defeating the Marathas in the Third Battle of Panipat (14 January 1761).

== See also ==
- Afghan–Maratha War
- Afghan–Sikh Wars
- Mughal–Afghan Wars

== Bibliography ==
- Sarkar, Jadhunath (1972). Fall of the Mughal Empire Vol. 2. M. C. Sarkar and Sons (Calcutta).
- Grewal, J. S. (1991). The Sikhs of the Punjab. Cambridge University Press.
- Singh, Ganda (1959). Ahmad Shah Durrani: Father of Modern Afghanistan. Asia Publishing House.
- Gupta, Hari Ram (1976). Later Mughal History of the Panjab (1707-1793). Sang-e-Meel Publications.
- Shejwalkar, T. S. (1946). Panipat: 1761. S. M. Katre for Deccan College Postgraduate and Research Institute.
- Gupta, Hari Ram (1978). History of the Sikhs: Evolution of Sikh Confederacies, 1708-1769. Munshiram Manoharlal.
- Society, Panjab Historical (1940). Journal of the Punjab University Historical Society Vol. 6. Department of History, University of the Punjab.
- Faridi, Maulana Noor Ahmad (1977). Tareekh-e-Multan Vol. 2. Ilm-o-Irfan Publications.
- Pandit, Casi Raja (1964). An Account of the last Battle of Panipat and of the Events Leading to it. H. Milford.
- Baloch, Ghulam Farooq (2011). "Treaty of Kalat between Balochistan and Afghanistan in 1758" (PDF). Archived from the original (PDF) on 4 March 2016.
- Gandhi, Rajmohan (2013). Punjab: A History from Aurangzeb to Mountbatten. Aleph Book Company.
- Parmu, R. K. (1969). A History of Muslim Rule in Kashmir, 1320-1819. People's Publishing House.
- Singha, H. S. (2000). The Encyclopedia of Sikhism (over 1000 entries). Hemkunt Publishers.
- Singh, Bhagat (1993). A History of the Sikh Misals. Publication Bureau, Punjab University.
- Bamzai, P. N. K. (1994). Culture And Political History Of Kashmir Mediaval Kashmir Vol. 2. M. D. Publications.
- Kulkarni, Uday S. (2011). Solstice at Panipat, 14 January 1761. Mula Mutha Publisher.
- Lari, Suhail Zaheer (1994). History of Sindh. Oxford University Press.
- Kalhoro, Zulfiqar Ali (2017). Studies in Kalhora History, Economy and Architecture. Sindh Books Karachi.
- Dashti, Naseer (2012). The Baloch And Balochistan: A Historical Account from the Beginning to the Fall of the Baloch State. Trafford Publishing.
