= Adina Beg Khan =

Nawab of Punjab in 1758

Janab Zafar Jang Bahadur Adina Beg Khan Bahram Jang
- ادینہ بیگ خاں
- Adina Beg tells his beads, possibly by Nainsukh, c. 1750, The San Diego Museum of Art

Nawab of Punjab
- In office 10 April 1758 – 15 September 1758
- Monarchs: Alamgir II (Note: For recognition); Rajaram II (Note: For tribute)
- Deputy: See list: Khwaja Said Khan (Wazir); Sadiq Beg Khan (in Lahore); Salih Muhammad Khan (in Multan)
- Investiture: 12 April 1758, Lahore Fort
- Preceded by: Office established (Note: Timur Khan Abdali (as Durrani Governor of Lahore) Ali Mohammad Khakwani (as Nawab of Multan))
- Succeeded by: Office abolished (Note: Sabaji Shinde (as Maratha Governor of Lahore) Bapuji Trimbak (as Maratha Governor of Multan))

Subahdar of Lahore
- In office 9 May 1756 – 4 October 1756
- Monarch: Alamgir II
- Deputy: Sayyid Jamil-ud-Din Khan
- Preceded by: Mughlani Begum
- Succeeded by: Khwaja Abdullah Khan
- In office April 1755 – December 1755
- Monarch: Alamgir II
- Deputy: Sadiq Beg Khan
- Preceded by: Mughlani Begum
- Succeeded by: Mughlani Begum

Subahdar of Multan
- In office 9 May 1756 – 4 October 1756; Disputed with Ali Mohammad Khakwani
- Monarch: Alamgir II
- Preceded by: Ali Mohammad Khakwani
- Succeeded by: Ali Mohammad Khakwani
Other political offices
Nazim of Bist Doab
In office May 1757 – November 1757
Monarch	Alamgir II
Governor	Mughlani Begum; Jahan Khan
Deputy	Sadiq Beg Khan
Preceded by	Mughlani Begum
Succeeded by	Sarfaraz Khan
In office 12 April 1755 – November 1756
Monarch	Alamgir II
Deputy	Sadiq Beg Khan
Preceded by	Shah Nawaz Khan
Succeeded by	Mughlani Begum
In office 1739–1740
Monarch	Muhammad Shah
Governor	Zakariya Khan
Deputy	Nidhan Singh
Succeeded by	Shah Nawaz Khan
Faujdar of Sirhind
In office 11 April 1755 – November 1757
Monarch	Alamgir II
Governor	Mughlani Begum
Deputy	Sadiq Beg Khan
Succeeded by	Abdul Samad Khan
Naib Nazim of Bist Doab
In office 1740 – 11 January 1748
Monarch	Muhammad Shah
Governor	Shah Nawaz Khan
Preceded by	Nidhan Singh
Shiqdar of Sultanpur
In office 1739–1740
Monarch	Muhammad Shah
Governor	Shah Nawaz Khan
Succeeded by	Office merged with the Nazim of Bist Doab

Personal details
- Born: Dīnā Araīŋ; 1710: Sharaqpur, Lahore Subah, Mughal Empire; (present-day Punjab, Pakistan)
- Died: 15 September 1758 (aged 47–48): Khanpur, Maratha Confederacy; (present-day Punjab, India)
- Cause of death: Colic
- Resting place: Muslim Cemetery, Khanpur; 31.545594°N 75.913260°E
- Children: 2
- Profession: Soldier; accountant; statesman; politician
- Awards: Farzi
- Religion: Sunni Islam (Note: School of Thought: Hanafi)
- Nickname: Nawab Sahib

Military service
- Allegiance: Mughal Empire; Maratha Empire
- Branch/service: Mughal Army; Mansabdari
- Years of service: c. 1730 – 15 September 1758
- Rank: Sepoy, Mansabdar, Faujdar, Ispahsalar
- Commands: See list: Sultanpur Jalandhar Sirhind Lahore Multan Batala
- Battles/wars: See list: Mughal–Afghan War; Battle of Lahore (1748); Battle of Manupur (1748); Mughal–Sikh wars; Siege of Ram Rauni (1748); Afghan–Sikh wars; Battle of Mahilpur (1757); Afghan–Maratha War; Reconquest of North India (1757–1758); Siege of Sirhind (1758)

Adina Beg Khan (Note: Punjabi: ادینہ بیگ خاں (Shahmukhi), ਅਦੀਨਾ ਬੇਗ ਖਾਨ (Gurmukhi), romanized: Adīna Bēg Khāṅ) (Punjabi: [ədinaː beːɡ xãː]; c. 1710 – 15 September 1758) was a Punjabi general, statesman, and warlord who served as the Nawab of Punjab from April 1758 until his death in September of the same year. He began his career as a patwari (accountant) and later as a sepoy after joining the Mughal army, eventually drawing the attention of the Mughal nobles. After serving through various posts, he was appointed as the subahdar of the entirety of Punjab by Raghunath Rao on behalf of Rajaram II in 1758 and had earlier been recognised as the Nawab by Emperor Alamgir II during the power vacuum.

Though illiterate, Adina Beg served as the shiqdar of Sultanpur Pargana, faujdar of Sirhind Sarkar, Naib Nazim and then Nazim of Bist Doab Sarkar and, later, the subahdar of the subahs of Lahore and Multan, though his claim in Multan was disputed. He joined hands with the Sikh leader Jassa Singh Ahluwalia and the Marathas in defeating the Afghans. Despite his short tenure, Adina Beg's reign has been compared with that of his aftercomer Ranjit Singh by modern historians.

== Early life ==
Named Dina at birth, Adina was born into a Punjabi Muslim family of the Arain tribe, in the village of Sharaqpur (now in the Sheikhupura District of Punjab, Pakistan), twenty miles (32 km) from Lahore. His father, Channu Arain was professionally a farmer. He was brought up as a soldier in a Mughal family, later becoming collector of revenue.

== Rise to power ==
Beg began his career as a domestic servant in the homes of Mughal officials. Proximity to Mughal officers inspired him to join as a soldier in the Mughal army. As a soldier, he was sent to various cities including Ilahabad, Kanhapur and Bajwara, however becoming disillusioned with his poor prospects he took up the more lucrative position of patwari in the village of Kang near Sultanpur. He soon came under the patronage of Lala Sri Nivas Dhir, a wealthy Hindu merchant from Sultanpur, and obtained the revenue contracts for all the villages in the territory of Kang. In 1739, aiming to replace the newly deceased district officer of Sultanpur, Adina travelled to Lahore and secured an interview with the Viceroy of the Punjab, Zakariya Khan Bahadur. Impressing in his interview, the viceroy demanded security for his good behaviour, and on being guaranteed by Lala Sri Nivas, Adina was appointed faujdar of Sultanpur. On his appointment he returned the favour by making his patron his assistant, and his patron's brother Bhwani Das, who knew Persian, his superintendent.

That same year, Nader Shah invaded the Mughal Empire. Sultanpur, located on the road from Lahore to Delhi was ravaged by Persian troops. Adina Beg's success in restoring order, providing relief and securing the release of prisoners enhanced his reputation. Zakariya Khan, learning of his performance, appointed him subahdar of the Doaba with instructions to restrain the lawlessness and halt the rising threat of the Sikh Misls. Soon after his appointment Adina Beg dispatched troops against the Sikhs and carried out a massive slaughter against them. Notably after restoring peace and order in the area, he ignored orders to take decisive steps to crush the Sikhs and instead pursued means of making peace with them. Recognising the decline of his Mughal employers he sought to make alliances with local groups, and granted jagirs to a number of Sikhs whilst also employing many in his armed forces, notably Jassa Singh Ramgarhia.

== Imprisonment ==
Nader Shah's invasion resulted in widespread looting, and led to Zakariya Khan being unable to pay his soldiers. After widespread protests by the soldiers, Zakariya Khan ordered his Diwan Lakhpat Rai to make the payments. The Diwan was imprisoned when he refused to do so and his brother Jaspat Rai was then ordered to demand arrears from all the nazims and faujdars in order to raise money. Adina Beg subsequently found himself imprisoned for being in arrears and was stripped of his position as governor of the Doaba.

After a year, Bhwani Das was released on the security of his brother Sri Navas and Adina escaped and fled to the hills. Bhwani Das was then re-arrested and ordered to disclose the accounts of Adina which he refused to do so. He was then placed in a large pot and half boiled. The now released Diwan, Lakhpat Rai, was so impressed by his loyalty that he halted the punishment and granted him one request. The latter demanded the reinstatement of Adina. Moved by the display of devotion, Zakariya awarded a robe of honour to Adina and made him Deputy Governor of the Doaba under his son Shahnawaz.

== Durrani Invasions ==
The death of Zakariya Khan on 1 July 1745 created a power struggle to succeed him as viceroy and six months later his son Yahiya Khan was named as his successor. Recognising the hostility between Yahiya Khan and his younger brother Shahnawaz, Adina sought to develop relations with Yahiya whilst also maintaining the trust of Shahnawaz. To support the Yahiya government in Lahore he assisted in Lakhpat Rai's campaign against the Sikhs between April and June 1746. In November 1746, Shahnawaz began an insurrection and forcibly occupied Lahore demanding a complete division of his father's property. This time Adina placed himself in the camp of Shahnawaz and the following March, on hearing news that Yahiya was seeking to launch an attack against Shahnawaz, Adina led an attack near the tomb of Hazrat Ishan. Shahnawaz was victorious and marched into Lahore unopposed on 21 March 1747 to usurp the Punjab government. He subsequently appointed Adina in charge of civil and military affairs for the Doaba. Shahnawaz now lobbied the Delhi government to become subahdar of Lahore in return for the release of Yahiya. However, on Yahiya's escape from captivity in July, Shahnawaz lost his bargaining power and on the advice of Adina he invited Ahmad Shah Durrani to invade the Mughal Empire.

Adina then notified the Delhi government of Shahnawaz's treachery, and on hearing of the news, the Delhi government hurriedly acquiesced to Shahnawaz's demands. They were however too late to halt Durrani's invasion. Durrani defeated his former ally Shahnawaz at Lahore before marching on Delhi. Adina was twice injured when assisting Moin-ul-Mulk (also known as Mir Mannu) in the Mughal victory at the Battle of Manupur which forced Durrani's retreat to Kabul. In return, the newly appointed subahdar of Lahore Mir Mannu reinstated Adina as faujdar of the Doaba. Durrani followed up his initial invasion a year later acquiring more territory to the west of the Indus River. During his third invasion, he defeated Mir Mannu at the Battle of Lahore and established Afghan supremacy in the Punjab although he kept Mir Mannu in place as his governor at Lahore. Following the war, Adina tried to gain favour with Mir Mannu and offered his support to a campaign against the Sikhs in Jullundur as a means to dispel suspicions of his treachery during the Afghan invasions.

In 1752, whilst travelling in Gurdaspur, he found the town of Adinanagar.

== Consolidating power ==
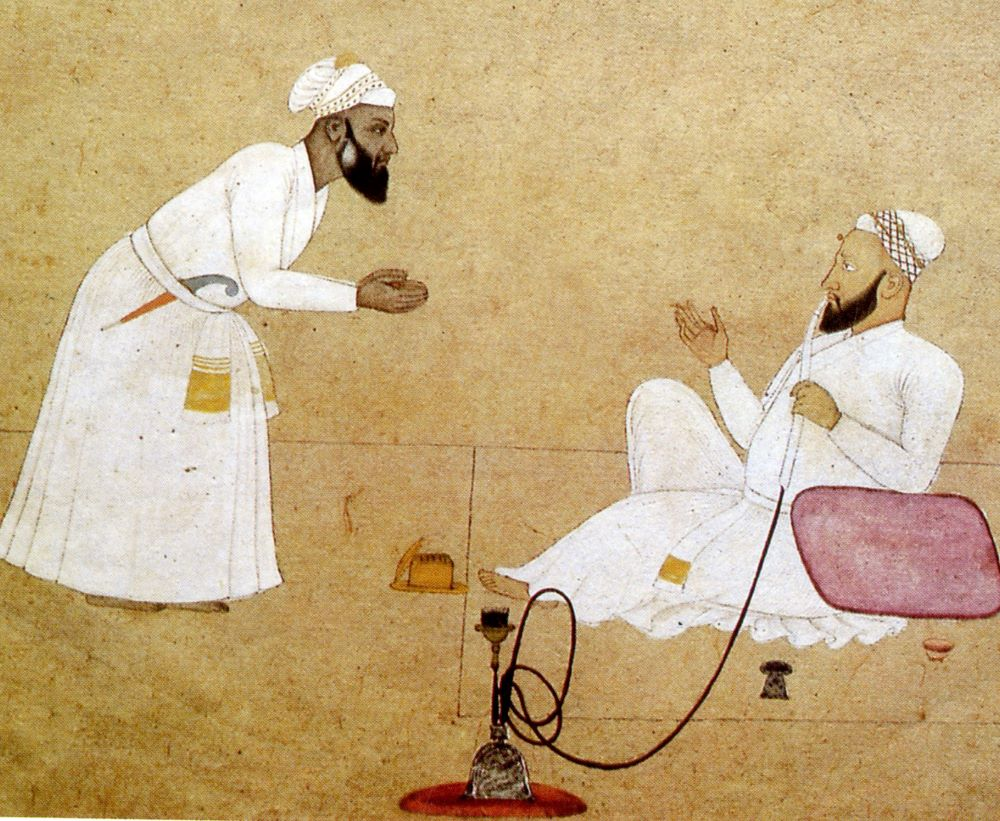
Painting of Nawab Adina Beg Khan (right) and Deendar Khoja (left), circa 18th century

On Mir Mannu's death on 3 November 1753, his two-year-old son was proclaimed viceroy, with his mother Surayya Begum becoming de facto ruler. Amid the political upheaval, Adina asserted independence from both the Durrani Empire and Mughal government at Delhi. In 1755, Adina drew the support of zamindars and an army of Sikhs to confront the threat of Qutb Khan who had seized Sirhind and on 11 April 1755, he met Qutb Khan in battle, emerging victorious and extending his control of the Doaba as far as Sirhind. He used his victory to demand the new territory from the Delhi government, and the Mughal Wazir noting their military incompetence and poverty agreed. Adina was conferred with the title Zafar Jung Bahadur and all the hill chiefs submitted to him and paid tribute. Now in control of Jullundur and Sirhind, Adina sought to acquire Lahore. Taking advantage of unrest in Lahore against the Begum's deputy Khwaja Abdullah, the son of Abd al-Samad Khan, he marched on the capital and installed Sadiq Beg Khan to manage state affairs. This victory was however short lived as the Begum, with the help of the Afghans, drove Sadiq Beg Khan from power and restored Khwaja Abdullah's position. In 1756, the Mughal Wazir used Adina to conduct an intrigue to dispose the Begum from government in Lahore and bring her to Delhi. On completion of the mission, Adina was made subahdar of Lahore and Multan by the Mughal government at Delhi in return for an annual tribute of thirty lakh of rupees. The position was however short lived, as the Afghans successfully marched on Lahore to dispose Adina's deputy Sayyid Jamal-ud-Din and restore Khwaja Abdullah.

In November 1756, following advances from the Begum the Afghans launched a campaign to ransack Delhi. Adina, accompanied by Sadiq Beg and Jamal-ud-Din abandoned his positions and fled to Hansi. The Afghans successfully sacked Delhi in 1757, and the Begum was granted the Doaba and Jammu and Kashmir as a fief. In turn the Begum invited Adina to rule the Doaba on her behalf. The new Viceroy at Lahore, Jahan Khan, then demanded the full obedience of Adina and threatened to lay waste to the Doaba if refused. Adina agreed, however soon disagreement over the payment of tribute to Jahan Khan heightened tensions. Jahan Khan invited Adina to court to discuss ways to subdue the Sikhs, but was rebuffed by Adina who sent agents in his place. A detachment of troops was then sent to arrest Adina, however he retired to the foothills and recruited a large body of Sikh soldiers to counter the detachment. The Sikhs led by Sodhi Bharbag Singh and Jassa Singh Ahluwalia routed the Afghans and looted their luggage. In return Adina granted the Sikhs leave to pillage the Doaba including the city of Jullundur. Amid the looting and Afghan defeat, and anarchy persisted in the Punjab between November 1757 to February 1758.

== Afghan expulsion and Maratha alliance ==
In early 1758, Adina sought out allies to expel the Afghans from the Punjab and restore stability. He struck a deal with Sikh leaders Jassa Singh Ahluwalia and Sodhi Vadhbhag Singh, and with their help defeated the Afghans at Mahilpur. By March 1758 he had also enlisted the support of Raghunathrao of the Maratha Empire, and together they expelled the Afghans from Lahore. The Maratha and Sikh forces then gave chase to the retreating Afghans on horseback and were in quick pursuit of them in which they went on to capture Attock and then Peshawar from the Afghans. The Punjab now came under Maratha rule, with Adina appointed subahdar and later Nawab of the Punjab in 1758 in return for a yearly tribute of seventy five lakh of rupees. Raghunathrao and Malhar Rao Holkar, the two commanders-in-chief of the Maratha forces, remained in Lahore for three months after which they retired to the Deccan leaving Adina in sole control. Now in control of the entirety of the Punjab, Adina entrusted Lahore to his son-in-law Khwaja Mirza and Multan to Salih Muhammad Khan, and set up his headquarters in Batala nearer to his traditional power base in the Doaba. He also appointed his brother, Khwaja Said Khan as his deputy. To entrench his position he sought to eliminate his rivals, and declared his erstwhile allies the Sikhs, outlaws. He pursued two expeditions against the Sikhs, including an abortive siege of the mud fort Ram Rauni near Amritsar.

== Personal life and death ==
Adina Beg married with a reputable woman of Arain Clan. The couple had a son and a daughter who was wed to Khwaja Mirza Khan Arain. On 15 September 1758, only a few months after his appointment, Adina Beg died at Khanpur near Hoshiarpur after suffering from a colic attack. The Marathas appointed Sabaji Shinde to succeed him as the governor of the Punjab. A tomb was erected at his grave in Khanpur. His life is described in an unpublished Persian manuscript, the Ahwal-i-Dina Beg Khan.

== In popular culture ==
- In the 2010 historical TV series Maharaja Ranjit Singh telecasted on DD National, the character of Adina Beg is portrayed by Rajendra Gupta.

== Gallery ==
Depictions of Adina Beg Khan
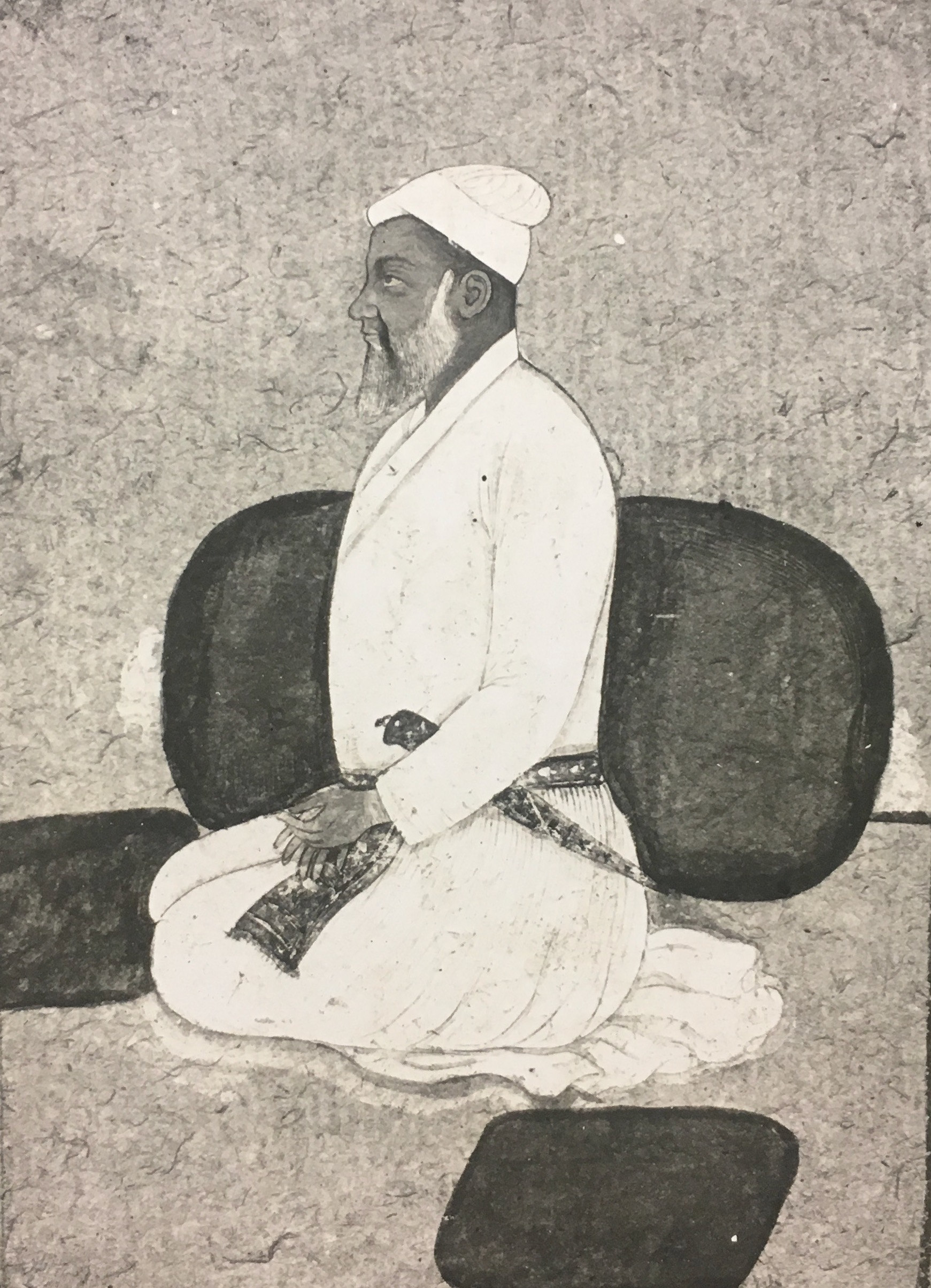
Elderly Adina Beg Khan

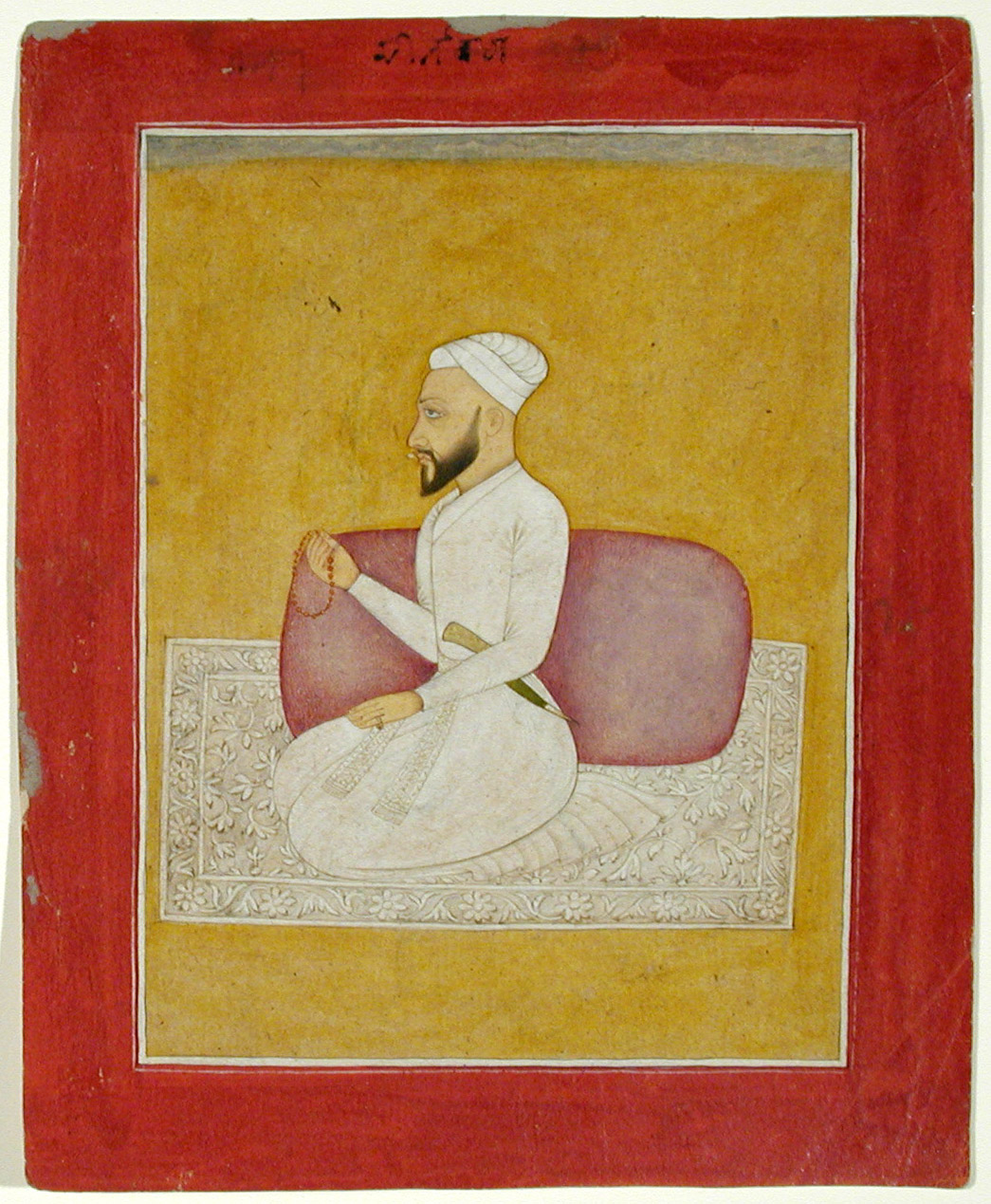
Adina Beg with prayer beads

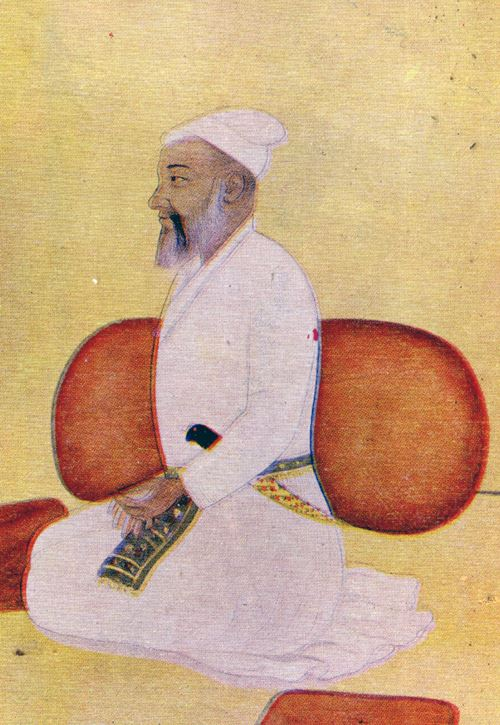
Painting of Adina Beg Khan leaning against a bolster

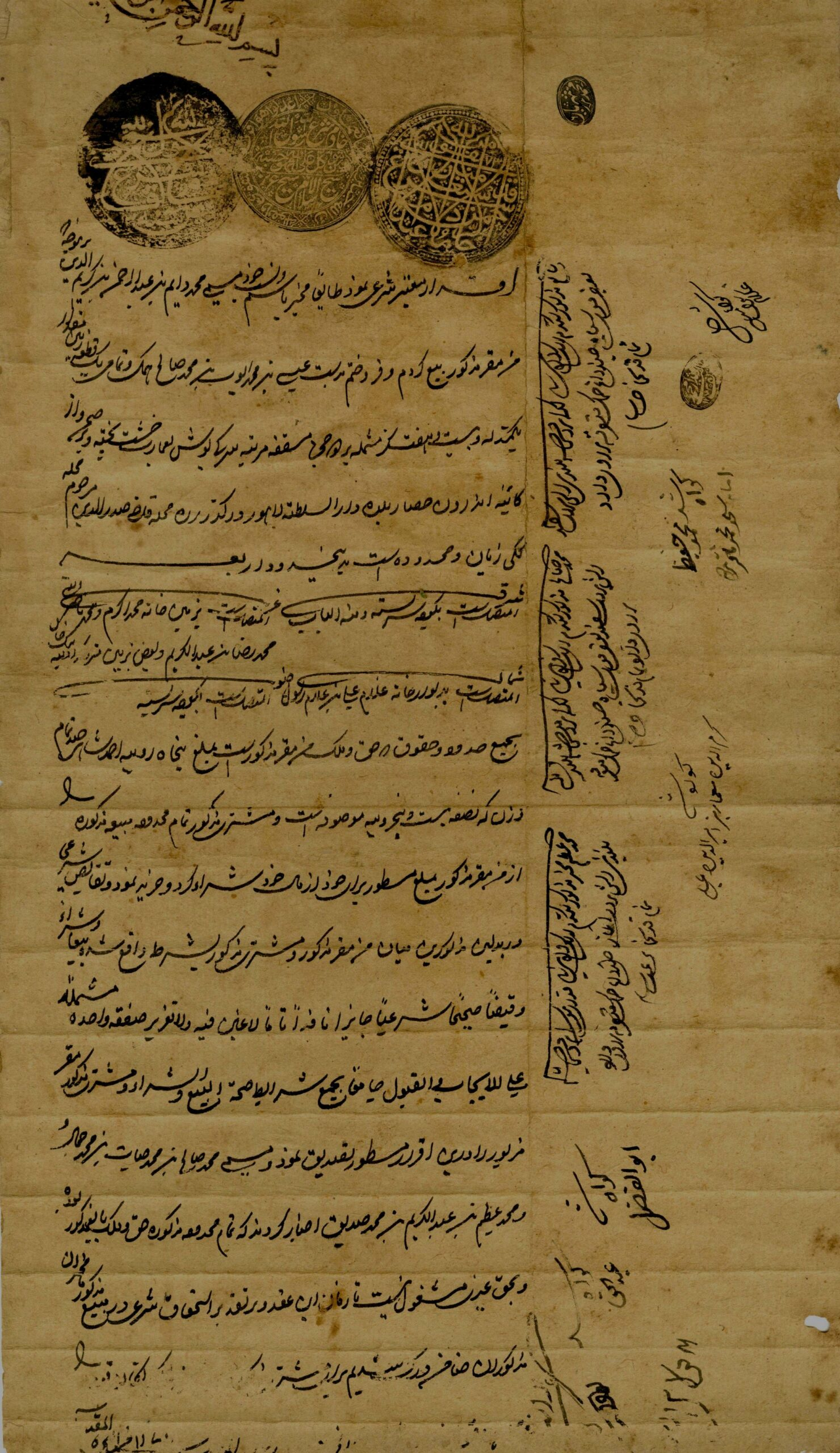
Deed house Chabuk Sawaran dated to 1170 AH (1756 CE), related to the governance of Adina Beg Khan

== See also ==
- History of Punjab
- List of Punjabi Muslims
