= Vadbhag Singh Sodhi =

Figure in Dhirmalia Sikhism

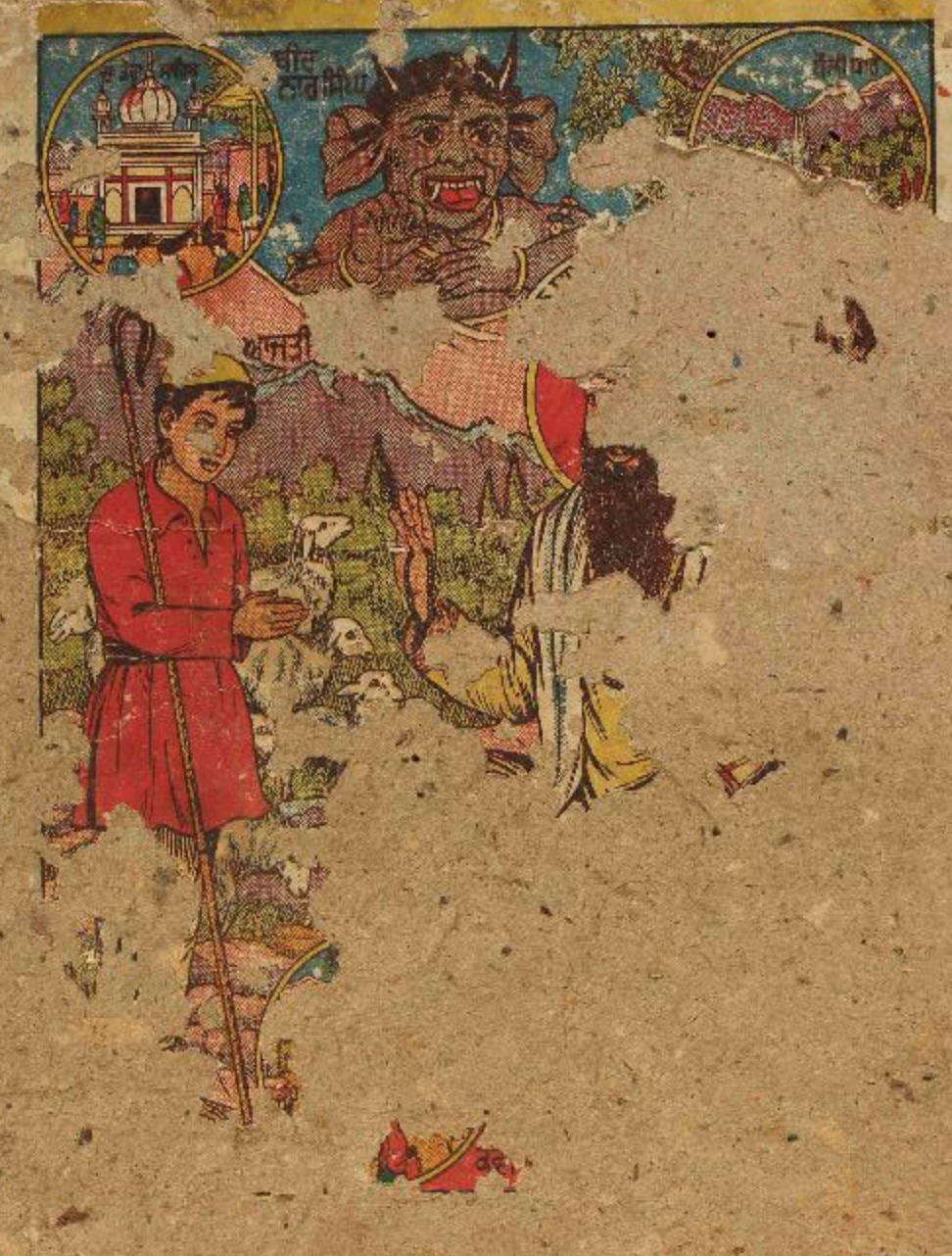
- Vadbhag Singh (right, damaged depiction). Illustration from a janamsakhi about his life.

Personal life
- Born: 1716 Kartarpur, Punjab, India
- Died: 31 December 1761 (aged 45) Mairi Himachal Pradesh, India
- Parent(s): Ram Singh Sodhi (father); Raj Kaur (mother)

Religious life
- Religion: Sikhism
- Sect: Dhirmalias

Vadbhag Singh Sodhi (1716 – 31 December 1761; his name is also spelt as Wadbhag Singh Sodhi, alternatively known as Sodhi Vadbhag Singh) was a direct descendant of Guru Hargobind and a prominent figure of the heretical Dhirmalia sect of Sikhism.

== Biography ==
=== Early life ===
Baba Vadbhag Singh was born at Kartarpur, a town near Jalandhar, Punjab of the Doaba region in 1716 A.D. He was the son of Baba Ram Singh and Mata Raj Kaur. He was a descendant of Dhir Mal, the first cousin of Guru Gobind Singh. He succeeded to the hereditary gaddi (religious seat) of Sodhis of Kartarpur.

Wadbhag Singh is believed to have approached Jassa Singh Ahluwalia in-order to request a reconsideration on the old injunction against the Dhirmalias by the Khalsa. After some deliberation, it was decided that the Dhirmalias could re-join the Sikh fold.

=== Sodhi's Revenge ===
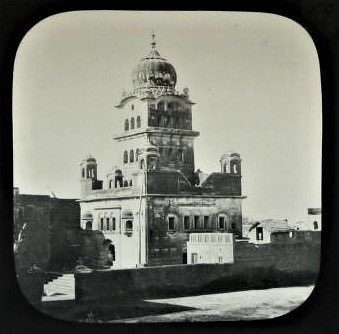
Photograph of Gurdwara Tham Sahib

In March 1757, Afghans destroyed Kartarpur and set fire to a historical pillar known as Thambh Sahib. Many civilians were killed and Kartarpur was looted. Sodhi was the custodian of Kartarpur, but was not present during the incident.

He created an alliance with Adina Beg, the last Mughal governor of Punjab, at his request. The alliance was against the Afghan invaders and occupiers, and included Jassa Singh Ahluwalia.

In the Battle of Mahilpur (1757) Sodhi was one of the generals of the Sikh army which was aided by Adina Beg. A hard-fought battle occurred which the Sikhs and Adina Beg won despite Afghan use of light artillery.

After the battle the Sikh forces attacked Jalandhar and defeated resistance that was put up. Sodhi had Jalandhar destroyed and looted in revenge for what happened in Kartarpur. Sodhi dug up the body of Nasir Ali, the faujadar of Jalandhar, and had it dragged. Nasir Ali was involved in the Kartarpur episode. He also burned the corpse. He further defiled the tomb with pork. Muslim women were seized and were converted to Sikhi after which they could marry any Sikh they pleased.

=== Death ===
After the battle, Sodhi lived in Mairi for the remainder of his life. He died on 31 December 1761. A shrine now stands at this location.

== Shrine ==
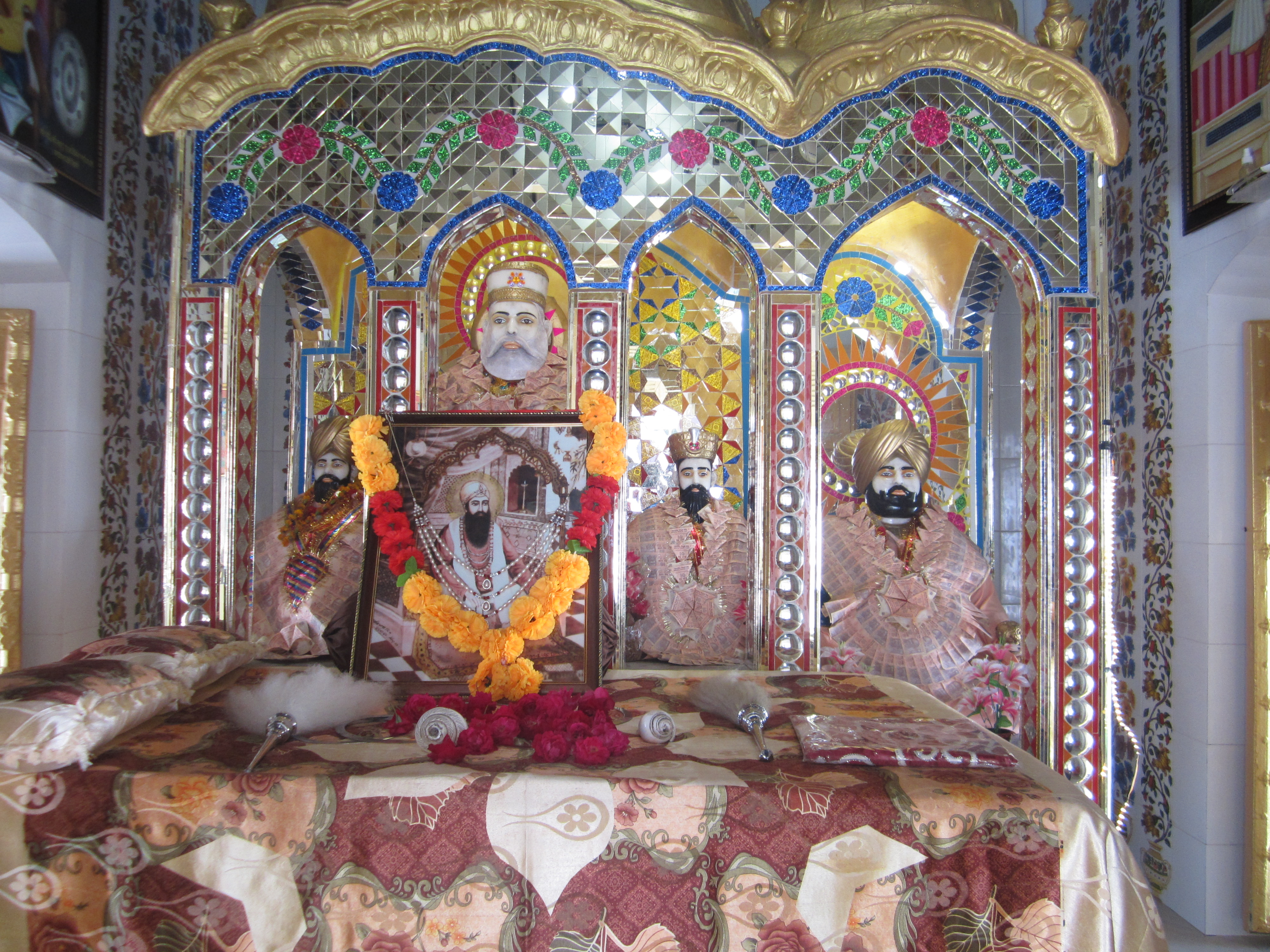
Punjabi folk shrine to Vadbhag Singh in Kartarpur, Jalandhar, Punjab, India.

Ḍerā Bābā Baḍbhāg Singh Gurūdvārā (Devanagari: डेरा बाबा बड़भाग सिंह) (Gurmukhi): ਡੇਰਾ ਬਾਬਾ ਬਡਭਾਗ ਸਿੰਘ is a shrine of Dera Baba Vadbhag Singh. It is located in Mairi village in the Indian state of Himachal Pradesh. It is known for Hollah Mohalla(Holi mela). Visitors come from all over the world, but mainly from North Indian states and union territories including Jammu and Kashmir, Punjab, Haryana, Delhi, Chandigarh and Himachal Pradesh.

=== Hola Mohalla fair ===
The Hola Mohalla fair is held at Dera Vadbhag Singh on the full moon day in the Vikrami month of Phalgun (February–March). The fair lasts for ten days, from a week before the full-moon to two days after. The fair is attended by people who seek protection against malign influences.
