= Khanpur, Hoshiarpur =

Khanpur is a village in the Mukerian tehsil of Hoshiarpur district in the northern Indian state of Punjab. It is located 4 kilometres (2.5 mi) from Mukerian, and 58 kilometres (36 mi) from the district headquarter Hoshiarpur. The village is administrated by a sarpanch who is an elected representative of the village as per Panchayati raj system.
