= Mughlani Begum =

18th century female ruler of Punjab

- Depiction of Mughlani Begum on the cover of a novel by Muhammad Rafique Dogar

Regent of Subah of Lahore
- Tenure: 1753–56
- Died: 1779; Jammu
- Spouse: Moin-ul-Mulk; Shahbaz (1761)
- Issue: Muhammad Amin; Mahmud Khan
- House: Mughal dynasty (by marriage)
- Father: Jani Khan
- Religion: Islam

Mughlani Begum (died 1779) also known as Suraya Murad Begum or Murad Begum, was the wife of Moin-ul-Mulk (Mir Mannu), the governor of the Subah of Lahore from 1748 to 1753. Mir Mannu had been forced to transfer his allegiance to Ahmad Shah Abdali of the Durrani Empire in April 1752. Mughlani Begum was the defacto ruler of the province of Lahore as regent from 1753, after the death of her husband, later serving as a viceroy for the Durranis. In 1756, when she was ousted from power by Adina Beg, and was known for playing her friends and foes against each other for her personal gains.

== Early life ==
Mughlani Begam, originally named Surayya Begam, and also known as Murad Begum, was married to Moin-ul-Mulk, popularly called Mir Mannu, who served as the Viceroy of Punjab from 1748 to 1753. Her father was Jani Khan, a prominent noble at the Delhi court, and her mother, Dardana Begam, was the daughter of Nawab Abd al-Samad Khan, the Viceroy of Punjab from 1713 to 1726, and sister to Nawab Zakariya Khan, who governed Punjab from 1726 to 1745. In her husband's family, she was given the name Murad Begam, but she was commonly known as Mughlani Begam.

== Biography ==
Following her husband's sudden death on November 3, 1753, when unpaid Mughal troops refused to release Muin’s body until their wages were settled, she took control of the treasury and worked for three days to clear their dues, preventing a major rebellion. A power struggle ensued when Bhikari Khan attempted to take Muin’s body to Delhi, but Begam insisted on bringing it to Lahore. Facing resistance, she secured the loyalty of Indian commanders and sent Qasim Khan to win over the Mughal troops by offering them rewards. Meanwhile, she strategically deployed guards to take control of Muin’s body, forcing Bhikari Khan’s men to retreat. With the army under her command, she successfully brought her husband's body to Lahore, where he was buried near Shahidganj, demonstrating her political acumen and leadership in a time of instability.

After Muin-ul-Mulk’s death, news of his passing reached Delhi on November 12, 1753. The next day, Emperor Ahmad Shah appointed his three-year-old son, prince Mahmud Khan, as the Viceroy of Lahore and Multan. Alongside him, Muin-ul-Mulk’s two-year-old son, Muhammad Amin, was named his deputy. However, the actual administration was controlled by Mumin Khan, while the real authority remained with Begum Sahiba. Since Punjab had been under Afghan rule since 1752, the true authority was exercised by Ahmad Shah Abdali rather than the Mughal emperor in Delhi. Unsatisfied with a mere nomination from Delhi, Begum sought Abdali’s confirmation to secure her son’s position. Both she and Mumin Khan submitted to Jahan Khan, the governor of Peshawar, requesting his help in obtaining approval from Abdali. As a result, by January 1754, Ahmad Shah Durrani officially appointed Muhammad Amin as the Governor of Punjab, with Mumin Khan as his deputy, an event marked with great celebrations.

=== Bhikari Khan’s Revolt and the Rise of Qasim Khan (1754) ===
Bhikari Khan, a powerful Turkish general and close associate of Muin-ul-Mulk, expected to be appointed deputy governor of Punjab after Muin's death. However, when Mumin Khan was given the position instead, he felt betrayed and sought support from Delhi’s Wazir, Intizam-ud-Daulah, who opposed the Begam. The Wazir granted Bhikari Khan the deputy governorship, but the Begam refused to recognize the order. Enraged, Bhikari Khan began gathering troops, primarily Afghan fighters from Kasur, fortified his residence, and openly defied her authority. To assert his power, he forcibly collected wealth from the people and built the Sunahri Masjid in Lahore. However, the Begam strategically weakened his influence by increasing the salaries of Mughal officers and granting them titles. She also won over Khwajah Mirza Khan, a key ally of Bhikari Khan, by appointing him as the head of Eminabad. With Khwajah Mirza’s help, she executed a plan to capture Bhikari Khan, who was arrested and imprisoned in her palace under tight security.

Even after Bhikari Khan's fall, challenges to the Begam’s rule continued. The instability in Delhi and her leadership as a woman encouraged other ambitious Turkish generals to seek power in Punjab. Among them was Qasim Khan, a soldier who had risen to prominence under Moin-ul-Mulk and had supported the Begam against Bhikari Khan. As a reward for his loyalty, she appointed him as the faujdar (military commander) of Patti in Lahore district. To strengthen his position, she provided him with cannons, cavalry, infantry, and financial support. Qasim Khan, whom she regarded as a son, played a crucial role in maintaining her authority amidst ongoing threats to her rule.

=== Qasim Khan’s Defeat and Imprisonment (1754) ===
After suppressing Bhikari Khan's rebellion in 1754, Mughlani Begam appointed Qasim Khan as the faujdar of Patti, providing him with troops, cannons, and financial support. However, during his campaign, he faced repeated defeats against the rising Sikh forces, hesitating to attack while his troops suffered heavy losses. His brother Alim Beg Khan's failed assault on a Sikh-held village further weakened his position, as even a small group of Sikh horsemen managed to rout his army. Overconfident, Qasim Khan later claimed to have allied with 8,000 Sikhs and planned to seize Lahore and march on Delhi, but he squandered resources by gifting arms to the Sikhs while neglecting his soldiers’ pay. This led to a mutiny within his ranks, and his own troops besieged his camp, cut down his tent ropes, and dragged him to Mughlani Begam, who had him imprisoned under strict guard within her palace.

=== Mughlani Begam’s Struggles and Controversies (1754) ===
In May 1754, Muhammad Amin Khan, the child governor of Punjab, died under suspicious circumstances, showing signs of poisoning like his father. With no immediate opposition, the Begam declared herself the ruler and sought recognition from Delhi and Kandahar. However, the Mughal Emperor was preoccupied with his struggles, and although Alamgir II later appointed Mumin Khan as governor, the Begam retained actual control. Her rule, however, faced severe challenges. The province was in chaos, and her reliance on eunuchs for administration led to inefficiency and conflicts among her advisors. Various regions, including Multan, Chahar Mahal, and northern Punjab, were either under Afghan rule or controlled by independent leaders like Adina Beg Khan, leaving only a small territory loyal to Lahore. Additionally, the Begam's personal life became a subject of scandal, as she was accused of improper relationships, particularly with Ghazi Beg Khan and the young Miskin. These rumors further undermined her credibility and contributed to the instability of her rule.

=== Revolt of Khwajah Mirza Khan (1754) ===
Despite their own moral failings, the courtiers of Lahore opposed the rule of Mughlani Begam, leading to fresh revolts. One of the key figures in this uprising was Khwajah Mirza Khan, an Uzbek chief who had once been a trusted commander under Moin-ul-Mulk. After initially siding with Bhikari Khan, he later accepted the Begam’s favor and was appointed faujdar of Eminabad, where he effectively controlled his territory, crushing Sikh resistance and maintaining order.

However, Bhikari Khan, still imprisoned, conspired with Mirza Khan’s brother, Khwajah Muhammad Said Khan, to overthrow the Begam. Encouraged by this plan, Mirza Khan marched to Lahore in December 1754, won over the Begam’s soldiers, and took control of her palace, looting its wealth, jewels, and valuables. The Begam was removed from power and confined in her mother's residence. Mirza Khan then declared himself Nawab, placing an aigrette on his head and distributing titles and rewards to his Mughal allies. Initially, several Mughal nobles submitted to his authority, but their unity soon collapsed due to jealousy and internal rivalries. Despite hosting gatherings and making promises of loyalty, the commanders turned against each other, leading to widespread disorder. While Mirza Khan launched some military campaigns against the Sikhs, his inability to maintain stability and secure revenue weakened his rule, allowing chaos to spread across the province.

=== Mughlani Begam’s Revenge and Lahore’s Turmoil (1755) ===
After being ousted from power, Mughlani Begam sought revenge against Khwajah Mirza and Bhikari Khan, who had played key roles in her downfall. She sent her uncle, Khwajah Abdullah Khan, to Ahmad Shah Abdali’s court in Kandahar, accusing the Mughal nobles of causing chaos in Punjab. Abdali ordered his general, Aman Khan, to march on Lahore with 10,000 troops in April 1755. Khwajah Mirza was easily defeated and imprisoned, while Lahore was plundered. The Begam was reinstated, and Khwajah Abdullah became her deputy. Bhikari Khan was handed over to the Begam, who had him brutally beaten and personally stabbed him before his corpse was discarded outside the city. However, Khwajah Abdullah soon turned against the Begam by July, confined her to her mother’s house, and took full control of Lahore, ruling with tyranny and oppressing the city’s inhabitants for wealth. Meanwhile, Adina Beg Khan, the powerful governor of Jullundur Doab, saw an opportunity amidst the unrest. In September 1755, he marched on Lahore, where Khwajah Abdullah’s oppressive rule had made him widely despised. Without resistance, Abdullah fled to Multan, allowing Adina Beg to seize the capital, appoint Sadiq Beg Khan as his deputy, and return to Jullundur.

=== Mughlani Begam’s Capture by the Delhi Wazir (March 1756) ===
After losing power, Mughlani Begam sought help from Delhi’s powerful Wazir, Imad-ul-Mulk, reminding him of his past betrothal to her daughter. At the same time, Mughal nobles from Lahore complained to the Wazir about her misrule and alleged immoral conduct, claiming she intended to marry her daughter to Ahmad Shah Durrani’s son. Imad-ul-Mulk, facing financial difficulties and eager to reassert Mughal control over Punjab, decided to intervene. Disguising his military expedition as a hunting trip, he left Delhi in January 1756, accompanied by Prince Ali Gauhar and a force of 10,000 troops. Adina Beg Khan, then in control of Lahore, suggested a cautious approach to avoid resistance and proposed sending a smaller force instead. Following this advice, Imad-ul-Mulk sent eunuch Nasim Khan with several thousand troops, who, along with Adina Beg’s forces, reached Lahore in March 1756. The local governor, Khwajah Abdullah Khan, fearing capture, fled the city, allowing the Begam to reclaim her residence and authority.

Soon after, Imad-ul-Mulk demanded the Begam send her daughter, Umda Begam, to his camp. Pleased with the proposal, she spent a month preparing a lavish dowry of jewels, cash, and household attendants before sending her with a military escort of 3,000 troops. However, the Wazir did not stop there. He sent his officers, reinforced by Adina Beg’s troops, to seize the Begam herself. They swiftly reached Lahore and captured her while she was asleep, confiscating all her wealth and belongings. Taken to the Wazir’s camp, she furiously condemned his actions, predicting that Ahmad Shah Durrani would avenge her disgrace. The Wazir ignored her protests and handed over the governorship of Lahore and Multan to Adina Beg Khan for an annual tribute of 30 lakh rupees. Having secured Punjab under his control, Imad-ul-Mulk returned to Delhi in May 1756.

=== Ahmad Shah Durrani’s Invasion of India (1756–57) ===
Ahmad Shah Durrani, encouraged by the political instability in Delhi, launched another invasion of India in 1756. Reports of internal strife, along with direct invitations from Emperor Alamgir II, Najib ad-Dawlah, and the ousted Mughlani Begam, persuaded him to march toward India. The Begam, desperate to reclaim her lost authority, tempted Durrani with the promise of immense wealth buried in the palace of her late father-in-law, Wazir Qamar-ud-din Khan. Durrani sent his envoy, Qalandar Beg Khan, to Delhi, demanding accountability for the actions of Delhi’s Wazir, but the mission failed. In response, Durrani left Kandahar in early autumn and arrived in Peshawar by November 1756. His son Timur Shah and commander-in-chief Jahan Khan led the vanguard, which crossed the Indus, plundering Eminabad and Batala along the way. Facing an imminent attack, Adina Beg Khan fled across the Beas, abandoning his camp to Durrani’s forces. The advancing Afghan army occupied the entire Jullundur Doab, forcing the local population to flee. Eventually, Adina Beg Khan sought refuge in the Kangra hills, recognizing that he was no longer safe in the plains.

With no serious resistance from the Mughal authorities, Ahmad Shah Durrani reached Delhi in early 1757 as if returning to his own home. Unlike his previous invasions, this time there was no opposition from Punjab or the Mughal court. The Wazir, who controlled the empire, failed to take any military action and instead relied on spiritual leaders to pray for protection. His only response was to send Mughlani Begam to negotiate with Durrani, but she instead accompanied him to Delhi. An earlier attempt to dissuade Durrani, led by Agha Ali Raza Khan with gifts worth two lakh rupees, had also failed. Durrani demanded two crore rupees in cash, the hand of the emperor’s daughter, and control over all lands west of Sarhind. On January 28, 1757, he entered Delhi, and his troops immediately began a ruthless plunder of the city, targeting both Hindus and Muslims. Torture and mass looting followed, with nobles’ homes ransacked and women stripped of their valuables. Mughlani Begam played a key role in guiding Durrani’s forces, revealing the hidden treasures of Delhi’s elite and even identifying the most beautiful women of the imperial palace for him.

=== The Atrocities of Ahmad Shah Abdali and Mughlani Begam ===
Ahmad Shah Abdali and Mughlani Begam carried out a reign of terror in Delhi, marked by mass plundering, brutal torture, and political maneuvering. Mughlani Begam, the wife of Moin-ul-Mulk, played a key role in these nefarious activities by providing intelligence to Sardar Jahan Khan, leading to the targeted looting of noble households. She particularly ensured that the wealth of her late father-in-law, Qamar-ud-din Khan, was confiscated, and she even had her own mother-in-law, Sholahpuri Begam, imprisoned and tortured to reveal hidden treasures. Under Abdali’s orders, a forced levy was imposed on every household, regardless of wealth or status, and those who could not pay faced severe punishment. For over a month, from February 4 to March 5, 1757, Delhi became a city of horror, where beatings, killings, and suicides were rampant. Abdali further cemented his control by forcibly marrying Hazrat Begam, the 16-year-old daughter of the late Mughal emperor Muhammad Shah, while also orchestrating a marriage between his son, Timur Shah, and Zohra Begam, the daughter of Emperor Alamgir II. Timur was then sent back to Punjab, carrying vast amounts of loot to Afghanistan.

Mughlani Begam’s influence over Abdali continued to grow as she personally gifted him expensive jewels on February 20, which pleased him so much that he granted her the title of "Sultan Mirza" and adorned her with his royal attire. She took advantage of his favor to restore Imad-ul-Mulk as Wazir, but Abdali imposed the condition that Imad must marry her daughter, Umda Begam. The wedding was arranged the same night under Abdali’s supervision, and as a reward, Imad received riches, elephants, and the title of "Farzand Khan." However, he was also forced to divorce his other wives, with one, Ganna Begum, being handed over to Mughlani Begam as a servant. Abdali then marched towards Mathura and Agra to attack raja Surajmal Jat, with Mughlani Begam accompanying him. As a further reward for her loyalty, Abdali granted her control over Jammu, Kashmir, and the Jullundur Doab. She quickly consolidated power by appointing Khwajah Ibrahim Khan as the governor of Kashmir, reaffirming Raja Ranjit Dev’s rule in Jammu, and entrusting Adina Beg Khan with the administration of Jullundur Doab. Her ruthless political ambition, combined with Abdali’s military dominance, left northern India in turmoil, devastating Delhi and its people.

=== Mughlani Begam’s Fall from Power ===
After Ahmad Shah Abdali departure, Mughlani Begam discovered that she had been deceived—her promised control over Punjab was revoked, and the territory was instead placed under the authority of Abdali’s son, Timur Shah. She had sent Miskin to present robes of honor to Adina Beg Khan, who was hiding in the Kangra hills, hoping to secure his loyalty. However, Adina soon received orders from Timur Shah and Jahan Khan to take charge of Jullundur Doab under their rule. Torn between his preference for Mughlani Begam’s suzerainty and Abdali’s pressure, Adina sought advice from Miskin, who suggested delaying his response until further clarification from the Begam..

Miskin traveled in search of Mughlani Begam, initially believing she had accompanied Abdali to Kandahar. After a long journey, he learned that she had returned to Lahore. Upon reaching Lahore, he discovered that Abdali had revoked her jagir and instead offered her a pension of rupees 30,000 per year and residence in the city. Unwilling to accept this humiliation, she pleaded with Abdali to honor his previous promise, following him as far as the Jhelum River in vain. Rejected, she returned to Lahore and took up residence in the ruined Serai Hakim, with only two rooms available for her stay. Meanwhile, Jahan Khan, frustrated by Adina Beg Khan’s silence, led a campaign of plunder across Jullundur Doab. To avoid further conflict, Adina agreed to govern the region under Timur Shah on the condition that he would not have to attend court in Lahore. Timur accepted this, granting Adina the governorship for an annual tribute of ₹36 lakhs, keeping his agent Dilaram in Lahore as a guarantee for payment.

However, within two months, a dispute arose between Jahan Khan and Adina Beg over the tribute. Jahan Khan demanded immediate payment, but Adina insisted on waiting until the harvest. Growing impatient, Jahan Khan attempted to summon Adina to Lahore, but he refused, sensing a trap. Timur Shah pardoned Adina’s absence but still expected the tribute to be paid. In retaliation, Jahan Khan imprisoned Dilaram, Adina's agent at Lahore, and demanded six lakhs of rupees. Mughlani Begam, now powerless but still influential, intervened to free Dilaram. She wrote to Adina Beg requesting funds and even sent some of her own jewelry to be pawned for the tribute. When Adina failed to respond, Dilaram, fearing execution, sought her help. She advised him to escape Lahore at night, collect the funds, and return swiftly. Jahan Khan, enraged by Dilaram’s escape, summoned Mughlani Begam to his house. In a shocking act of humiliation, he personally beat her with a rod until she surrendered jewelry worth six lakhs of rupees. His men then looted her residence, taking everything, including Miskin’s belongings. She was confined in a small room and subjected to unspeakable oppression for two days. This marked the lowest point in her downfall, stripping her of wealth, power, and dignity.

=== Mughlani Begam’s Stay in Batala (May–September 1758) ===
Following Adina Beg Khan’s alliance with the Marathas and Sikhs, Jahan Khan was forced to retreat from Lahore on April 9, 1758. As the Marathas advanced, he moved his camp to Shahdara, across the Ravi, taking Mughlani Begam and her daughter with him. However, Miskin, her trusted servant, managed to smuggle them back to Lahore in a covered bullock cart and placed them in their residence.

After the Afghans’ withdrawal, the Marathas appointed Adina Beg Khan as the viceroy of Punjab for an annual tribute of 75 lakhs of rupees. However, Adina preferred ruling from Batala rather than Lahore, leaving his son-in-law, Khwajah Mirza Khan, in charge of the provincial capital. Fearing Mughlani Begam’s intrigues, Khwajah Mirza requested Adina to take her away. Adina obliged, providing her with a few thousand rupees and 200 bullock carts for the journey to Batala.

In Batala, Adina Beg treated Mughlani Begam with generosity, granting her 2,000 rupees per month and an additional 50 rupees per day for kitchen expenses. She was provided with a large mansion, and the jewelry she had previously sent him to pawn for ransom was returned to her. Leaving her daughter and household in the mansion, she personally resided in Adina Beg’s camp. He ensured that all her servants were treated well, giving each of them horses and paying them punctually.

=== Conflict with Miskin ===
After her husband's death, she inherited his former property, including his slaves. One of the enslaved was a young man named Tahmas Khan Miskin, originally from Turkey. Despite her improved circumstances, an unexpected scandal arose. Mughlani Begam, now around 40 years old, reportedly developed an attraction toward Tahmas Khan Miskin, an 18-year-old servant described as tall and handsome. However, Miskin, considering himself a loyal servant, resisted her advances. Enraged by his rejection, the Begam had him imprisoned and even considered killing him. He later wrote: "One day, an unfortunate event took place, the details of which are beyond propriety to mention. The Begam became extremely angry, had me imprisoned, and even planned to end my life. But fate protected me, and I survived. Soon, the reason for my suffering became known to all, and even Adina Beg Khan intervened, reminding the Begam of the injustice of mistreating a loyal servant. After fifteen days, she calmed down and forgave me." Mughlani Begam enjoyed a peaceful life in Batala for a few months, but her fortunes soon changed. In September 1758, Adina Beg Khan fell gravely ill with colic. After ruling Punjab under the Marathas for just five months, he died on September 15, 1758. She later freed Miskin from slavery.

== Life in Jammu ==
When Mughlani Begam arrived in Jammu, Raja Ranjit Dev provided her with a temporary house near the residence of Udho Minister. Though the house was not up to her standards, there was no better alternative. To please her, the Raja ordered the construction of a new house, but even this did not meet her expectations. However, she chose to accept it and rewarded the city officer (Kotwal) with a robe of honor to avoid any future conflicts. The Raja visited her twice a week to show respect and later offered her a monthly allowance of 1,000 rupees. However, due to her past status and pride, she refused to live on charity.

Many nobles, officials, and wealthy people from Lahore were also in Jammu and visited the Begam. She welcomed them warmly, giving each a shawl and a robe of honor, distributing about 150 shawls in total. Despite her financial struggles, she continued to maintain a staff of around 200 people and was generous with gifts. This extravagant lifestyle quickly drained her funds. She later pawned her jewelry for 30,000 rupees, but even that was spent within a short period, leaving her with no money for basic needs.

Miskin, tried to help. He had received 400 rupees for some jewels that the Begam had gifted to Raja Ranjit Dev. He also collected pearls from other servants and even gave up a nose ring that his wife had received from the Begam. The Begam initially refused to accept these, but Miskin handed them over to the kitchen staff to ensure that essential supplies were purchased.

=== Opportunity to Govern Kashmir ===
At this time, Sukh Jiwan Mal, the governor of Kashmir, was worried that Mughlani Begam might try to take over his position with the support of Ahmad Shah Durrani. To prevent this, he sent an agent to negotiate with her, offering gifts and a tribute if she agreed to stay in Jammu and not interfere in Kashmir. However, once his agent confirmed that the Begam had no plans to enter Kashmir, Sukh Jiwan Mal decided not to send any money or gifts. A few days later, a messenger named Hasan Manda arrived from Kashmir. He represented a group of nobles who were fighting against Sukh Jiwan Mal. They had gathered an army of 12,000 men but lacked a strong leader. Hasan Manda urged the Begam to lead their forces and take control of Kashmir, as she had previously been appointed its governor by Ahmad Shah Durrani.

Miskin advised her to accept the offer, but she preferred to wait for the promised tribute from Sukh Jiwan Mal instead. However, the tribute never arrived. Meanwhile, Hasan Manda kept sending requests, suggesting that if she did not want to go personally, she could send an agent with an official document from Durrani confirming her authority over Kashmir. He assured her that with 500 horsemen, he could secure the province for her. At this point, the Begam decided to take action. She first offered the position of her representative to Ghazi Beg Khan, also known as Aqil Beg Khan, who had once been her close confidant and paymaster in Lahore. He refused. She then considered Abu Tarab Khan, but Hasan Manda objected, saying that because he was a Kashmiri, he might not gain full respect from all factions. Finally, Miskin was chosen, and Hasan Manda approved of the decision. However, Miskin’s associates suspected that the Begam might betray him. He reassured them and started preparing for the mission.

The next challenge was to find 500 soldiers, but there was no money left for recruitment. To solve this, Miskin sold some rugs and carpets and managed to collect 2,000 rupees. He then set up a camp outside the city to begin recruiting troops, where he was soon joined by Hasan Manda.

=== The Begam is Tricked by a Priest ===
While preparing for the Kashmir expedition, Miskin recruited nearly 400 soldiers in a single day. He worked tirelessly from morning until midnight, registering the new recruits. Late at night, after most had gone to sleep, the Begam arrived at his camp disguised as a man, wearing a turban and cloak. Miskin was surprised and respectfully asked why she had come in such a manner.

The Begam explained that a Muslim preacher (Mulla) had promised to unearth a hidden treasure worth 30,000 rupees. To facilitate this, she had already given him 500 rupees for perfumes, another 500 rupees to buy a special horse for sacrifice, and 1,000 rupees as an advance payment. The Mulla had chosen that very night for the ritual, and she wanted Miskin to accompany her. She mentioned that laborers and torchbearers were already waiting.

Miskin was disheartened, realizing that his carefully laid plans for the Kashmir mission had been ruined. He sent Faizullah Beg to check on the Mulla’s activities. However, Faizullah found no trace of the Mulla or any ritual. When he returned with Darab Beg for another inspection, they again found nothing. A messenger was then sent to the Mulla’s residence, where neighbors informed him that the Mulla had rented the house for ten days but had left that very evening with his entire family. The Begam was devastated upon realizing she had been deceived. In frustration, she returned to her house and lashed out at her servants and attendants, blaming them for supporting the scheme.

=== Tensions Between the Begam and Miskin ===
Now desperate, the Begam ordered Miskin to arrange another 2,000 rupees and proceed with the expedition. Miskin, however, politely declined, saying he could not gather any more money. The Begam became furious and insulted him openly. Seeing this, the soldiers and recruits lost faith and fled, leaving Miskin alone with just four horses. Soon after, one of his horses was stolen, and two others were forcibly taken by former allies, leaving him with only one. Most of his servants abandoned him, except for two loyal ones. For forty days, Miskin remained in the camp, hoping to regain the Begam’s trust. However, she did not forgive him. Meanwhile, his remaining men, who had not been paid, demanded their salaries. Some wanted to approach the Begam directly, but Miskin refused to lead them.

=== A Narrow Escape for the Begam and Miskin ===
Among Miskin’s unpaid soldiers, two men—Afrasiyab Beg and Bahroz Beg—were particularly furious. They threatened to kill the Begam if they did not receive their wages. Miskin tried to calm them down, but they were determined. He secretly sent Darab Beg after them, hoping he could stop them. The two men stormed into the Begam’s house, threw her to the ground, and drew their swords to kill her. Realizing the danger, the Begam quickly controlled her anger and pleaded with them. She assured them she still had valuable jewelry and would pay them immediately. This momentarily calmed them, and they released her. Seizing the opportunity, the Begam rushed to the rooftop and shouted for help. The commotion attracted people, who rushed in and captured the two attackers. Furious, the Begam blamed Miskin for the entire situation and summoned him immediately. When he arrived, she publicly scolded him

At that moment, Mukarma, the city’s Kotwal (chief officer), arrived. He assured the Begam that he would punish the troublemakers. He then grabbed Miskin by the arm and took him to the street, where he gathered the Begam’s Turki servants and declared that she was an unworthy woman. He told them not to worry, as he would take care of the matter within a few days. Later, the Kotwal sent a messenger to Miskin, demanding a pearl necklace as a bribe to settle the issue. Miskin, however, was completely broke and could not pay.

The next day, Miskin and Afrasiyab Beg were summoned to the Kotwal’s house, where they were bound hand and foot and lowered into a well, leaving them just above the water level. Later, two more men, Muqim Beg and Husain Beg, were thrown into the same well. Miskin’s hands were tied behind his back, making escape impossible. From above, the Kotwal again demanded a pearl necklace, threatening to drown them if they did not comply. When the Begam learned that Miskin and the others had been imprisoned in the well, she immediately ordered their release. Afrasiyab Beg and Bahroz Beg were dismissed from her service, while the others were set free.

=== Miskin Escorts the Begam’s Daughter to Delhi ===
Miskin, a loyal servant of Mughlani Begam’s family, was deeply concerned about the fate of her younger daughter due to the Begam’s declining fortunes and questionable associations. During this time, Khwajah Said Khan, a former official of Lahore, arrived in Jammu. Miskin approached him and convinced him to help the Begam by escorting her daughter to Delhi, where her elder sister and Nawab Ghazi-ud-Din Khan, her brother-in-law, resided. Miskin argued that this act would earn the Nawab’s favor. Said Khan agreed and provided 300 rupees to cover travel expenses. With this sum, Miskin arranged for fifteen carriages and several maid-servants to accompany the young lady on her journey. The arduous journey to Delhi took a month.

During their stay in Delhi, an incident occurred involving one of the Begam’s maid-servants who had eloped to be with Mahabbat, a eunuch and former servant of the Begam. Enraged by the disappearance, the Begam interrogated and brutally punished her servants, leading to the death of one maid. The missing woman was later found in Jammu, revealing the harsh environment in the Begam’s household.

=== Mughlani Begam’s Grant of Sialkot & Miskin’s Administration (April 1760) ===
By early 1760, Ahmad Shah Abdali launched another invasion of India, prompting the Begam to travel to Delhi, where she met Miskin. She joined Abdali’s camp at lake of Nawab Qamar-ud-din Khan and, upon explaining her financial hardships, was granted the revenues of Sialkot parganah, worth 30,000 rupees annually. She appointed Abu Tarab Khan as her agent in Sialkot, but Rustam Khan, the ruler of Chahar Mahal, refused to relinquish control.

To enforce her authority, the Begam appointed Miskin as the administrator of Sialkot and provided him with an official decree. Miskin took charge without resistance and efficiently collected 15,000 rupees in half-yearly revenue, which he sent to the Begam.

=== Miskin’s Capture by the Sikhs (October 1760) ===
By October 1760, Ahmad Shah Abdali had recalled most of his troops from Punjab, allowing the Sikhs to assert dominance in the region. When the time came to collect the next installment of revenue, Sikh and Hindu cultivators resisted, leading to an uprising. The Sikhs captured and later ransomed Rustam Khan, the governor of Chahar Mahal, and Miskin.

Rustam Khan, accompanied by 150 soldiers, set out to confront 50 Sikhs attacking a village. Miskin joined him, but upon arrival, they discovered that the village was surrounded by 4,000 Sikhs. Forced to take refuge in a ruined fort, they defended themselves using firearms, stones, and debris. However, their ammunition ran out, and by noon, the Sikhs stormed the fort, capturing Miskin and Rustam Khan. Initially, the Sikhs demanded 1,00,000 rupees as ransom but later settled for 6,000 rupees. Miskin was taken towards his village under Sikh escort, forced to walk a long distance. Exhausted and despairing, he prayed for divine intervention. Soon after, a zamindar with 40-50 armed men attacked the Sikhs, rescuing Miskin and capturing the Sikhs' loot. Miskin remained captive for ten days, suffering from poverty and hardship. The zamindar mistook him for an ordinary Mughal soldier and freed him after extracting 200 rupees. Rustam Khan, however, was released only after paying 22,000 rupees.

After returning to Jammu, Miskin gave the Begam 500 rupees from his savings in Sialkot. She thanked him but mentioned that the 15,000 rupees he had previously sent had already been spent, and she was in urgent need of more money. Miskin explained the hardships he had endured in Sialkot, and the Begam seemed pleased with his loyalty.

However, Abu Tarab Khan, whom the Begam had originally chosen for a key position, grew jealous of Miskin’s success. He used his mother, sister, and wife to convince the Begam to replace Miskin with him. The Begam eventually agreed and appointed Abu Tarab, who then sent Darab Beg to Sialkot in Miskin’s place, while Miskin was kept in Jammu.

Despite this, no local landlords (zamindars) in Sialkot submitted to Darab Beg. The Begam herself traveled to Sialkot and stayed for two weeks, but no one came to pay homage to her. Disappointed, she returned to Jammu. Raja Ranjit Dev and his minister advised her to reinstate Miskin, but instead of appreciating his value, the Begam became suspicious of his growing popularity and placed him under house arrest. Miskin remained imprisoned for about six months (November 1760 – March 1761). He was only released when Ahmad Shah Durrani returned to Lahore, thanks to the intervention of Fatah Ali Khan Qizalbash, a high-ranking official. During Miskin’s absence, the Begam was only able to collect 3,000 rupees from Sialkot’s landlords, and even that was paid out of fear of Durrani’s presence in Lahore. Although she knew Miskin was the best person to manage her affairs, her pride prevented her from admitting her mistake.

=== Mughlani Begam Marries a Eunuch (June 1761) ===
Not long after Ahmad Shah Abdali’s departure, Abu Tarab Khan died. The Begam was devastated and irrationally blamed Miskin, accusing him of using magic to kill Abu Tarab. In Miskin’s absence, Abu Tarab had been the head of her household, with a eunuch named Shahbaz serving as his assistant. After Abu Tarab’s death, Shahbaz was promoted to his position. Rumors soon spread about the Begam’s inappropriate relationship with Shahbaz, and for two or three months, people in Jammu openly gossiped about her conduct. The scandal became so widespread that she found it impossible to continue living in Jammu. To escape the public eye, she moved to Samba, a remote area beyond the direct control of Raja Ranjit Dev.

Miskin was left behind in Jammu to settle her affairs. After seventeen days, he joined her in Samba, only to discover that she had abandoned her female attendants and family members in Parmandal. She was now living alone with Shahbaz. When Miskin arrived, the Begam shockingly announced that she had married Shahbaz. She instructed Miskin to congratulate her new husband and offer him a gift of 5 rupees. In return, she promised to reward Miskin with a valuable sword, a pearl necklace, and his old position in Sialkot. Miskin was outraged. He reminded the Begam of her noble lineage, listing the names of her distinguished relatives, including her father, uncle, husband, and the powerful Nizam-ul-Mulk Asaf Jah. Instead of reflecting on his words, the Begam became furious and scolded him harshly.

== The Begam’s Final Years and Tragic End (1761–1779) ==
After marrying the eunuch Shahbaz, Mughlani Begam saw Miskin as a threat to her new life. She ordered him to move to Parmandal, where she secretly planned his murder. When Miskin arrived in the evening, the Begam and her husband reached the place at night, surrounding his house with fifty guards to keep watch. However, Parmandal was under the authority of a local mendicant (Mahant), who resided in a nearby temple. Miskin quickly sent a message explaining his predicament and requesting his intervention. The Mahant, along with his followers, marched to Parmandal and freed Miskin from captivity. Without wasting time, Miskin fled with his wife, child, and Darab Beg to Jammu. From there, he moved to Sirhind and later entered the service of Zain Khan Sirhindi, effectively cutting all ties with the Begam. For the next 18 years, there is no record of Mughlani Begam’s activities, as Miskin had completely withdrawn from her service. He eventually settled in Delhi, where he gained prominence and became a notable figure in the Mughal Empire.

In 1779, fate brought them together once more. The once-powerful Begam, who had enjoyed the support of Ahmad Shah Durrani and wielded considerable influence, was now destitute. She arrived in Delhi in a state of misery, without any comforts of life. Despite their turbulent past, Miskin did what he could to assist her, ensuring that she had a place to stay during her two-month visit to the imperial capital. After her brief stay in Delhi, the Begam returned to Jammu, where she died shortly thereafter.

== In popular culture ==
Soundtrack cover for the 1979 film ‘Mughlani Begum’

Indian film director Surjit Singh Sethi made Mughlani Begum, a 1979 Punjabi-language film about the Begum and Mir Mannu, starring Preet Kanwal in the titular role.
