= Whichcote =

Whichcote is a surname, and may refer to:

- Benjamin Whichcote (1609–1683), English cleric, academic and leader of the Cambridge Platonists
- Francis Whichcote, 3rd Baronet (c.1692–1775), English politician
- George Whichcote (1794–1891), British Army officer
- Sir Jeremy Whichcote, 1st Baronet (c. 1614–1677), English barrister
- Sir Paul Whichcote, 2nd Baronet (1643–1721), Fellow of the Royal Society
- Whichcote baronets
