= John Worthington (academic) =

English academic (1618–1671)

John Worthington (1618–1671) was an English academic. He was closely associated with the Cambridge Platonists. He did not in fact publish in the field of philosophy, and is now known mainly as a well-connected diarist.

== Life ==
He was born in Manchester, and educated at Emmanuel College, Cambridge. At Emmanuel he was taught by Joseph Mead; he described Mead's teaching methods, and later edited his works. Another teacher was Benjamin Whichcote.

He was Master of Jesus College, Cambridge, from 1650 to 1660, and Vice-Chancellor in 1657. At the English Restoration he was replaced by Richard Sterne, apparently willingly. Subsequently he held various church positions, being lecturer at St Benet Fink in London until the church burnt out in the Great Fire of London in 1666. He then was given a living at Ingoldsby. At the end of his life he was a lecturer in Hackney.

He died in London in 1671 and he left his books on Jakob Boehme and Hendrik Niclaes to the philosopher Elizabeth Foxcroft and to her son the alchemist Ezechial Foxcroft.

== Family ==
He married Mary Whichcote, in 1657. She was niece to both Benjamin Whichcote and Elizabeth Foxcroft (née Whichcote), mother of Ezechiel Foxcroft.

== Hartlib correspondence ==
Worthington was an active correspondent of Samuel Hartlib, the "intelligencer", in the period 1655 to 1662. At Worthington's request, Hartlib's close collaborator John Dury searched in the Netherlands for the lost papers of Henry Ainsworth. He shared with Hartlib and Dury (and both Henry More and John Covel) an interest in the Karaites. He was also involved in the connections between Hartlib and Dury with Adam Boreel in Amsterdam, including the Boreel project to translate the Hebrew Mishnah into Latin and Spanish.

After Hartlib's death, Worthington took on the task of organising his archive of correspondence, which had been bought by William Brereton, 2nd Baron Brereton. After a period of nearly 300 years, the bundles into which he sorted it were rediscovered, and his system for the archive persists.

== Works ==
- The Christian's Pattern: a translation of the De Imitatione of Thomas à Kempis (1654)
- John Smith, Selected Discourses (London, 1660) editor
- Life of Joseph Mede with third edition of Mede's Works (1672)
- The Great Duty of Self-Resignation to the Divine Will (1675)
- The Diary and Correspondence of Dr. John Worthington, 2 vols. (1847–86, Chetham Society), editor James Crossley

== Notes ==
Academic offices
Preceded by Thomas Young	Master of Jesus College, Cambridge; 1650–1660	Succeeded by Richard Sterne
