= Elizabeth Foxcroft =

English theosophist (1600–1679)

- Born: Elizabeth Whichcote; 1600; Stoke upon Tern
- Died: 1679 (aged 78–79)
- Occupations: companion and amenuensis
- Known for: theosophist
- Spouse: George Foxcroft
- Children: Ezechiel Foxcroft

Elizabeth Foxcroft (1600 – 1679) was an English theosophist. She was Anne Conway's companion and they were both interested in the views of the German philosopher Jakob Böhme. Her son, Ezekial, was a follower of the Cambridge Platonists.

== Life ==
Foxcroft was born in Stoke upon Tern in 1600 in Shropshire where her parents Elizabeth (born Fox) and Christopher Whichcote lived at Whichcote Hall. Her younger brothers were Jeremy (later Sir Jeremy) and Benjamin Whichcote. Benjamin became the Provost of King's College, Cambridge.

She married George Foxcroft who was later employed by the East India Company.

She became involved with the Cambridge Platonists via Henry More who was one of their leaders and within the group she met the philosopher Anne Conway. When her husband left for India in 1666 she went to live at Ragley Hall with the Conways. The two of them were of similar interests and she became Coway's companion and amenuensis. Foxcroft is thought to be the reason that both of them became interested in the writings of Jakob Böhme.

When Henry More published his treatise Philosophiae Teutonicae censura on the controversial Jakob Böhme it is presumed that this was for her. More surprised some by his sympathetic interpretation of Boehme's views. He noted that he was better than the Quakers and his mild criticism may have encouraged Foxgrove and Conway's defense of his work.

== Death and legacy ==
There are a few letters to her that her extant but none of her writing survives. She died in 1679 and she was buried in Clapham on 25 August 1679. Her son, Ezekiel, did not survive her. He had been born in 1629 and educated at Eton and Cambridge. His interest in the Cambridge Platonists and Rosicrusianism is thought to have been inherited from his mothers interests. He died unmarried five years before she did.
