= Swarby =

Village in Lincolnshire, England

Coordinates: 52.953271°N 0.442943°W

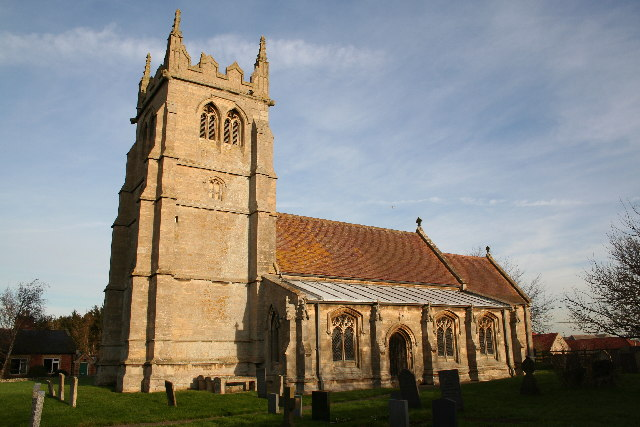
- St Mary and All Saints' Church, Swarby

- Location within Lincolnshire
- OS grid reference: TF047406
  - London: 100 mi (160 km) S
- Civil parish: Aswarby and Swarby
- District: North Kesteven
- Shire county: Lincolnshire
- Region: East Midlands
- Country: England
- Sovereign state: United Kingdom
- Post town: Sleaford
- Postcode district: NG34
- Police: Lincolnshire
- Fire: Lincolnshire
- Ambulance: East Midlands
- UK Parliament: Sleaford and North Hykeham

Swarby is a village and former civil parish, now in the parish of Aswarby and Swarby, in the North Kesteven district of Lincolnshire, England, approximately 3 miles (5 km) south-southwest of Sleaford, 900 yards (820 m) west of the A15 road and 1 mile (1.6 km) to the northwest of Aswarby. In 1921 the parish had a population of 141. On 1 April 1931 the parish was abolished to form "Aswarby and Swarby".

The village name is Scandinavian in origin, and comes from the Old Norse for a farmstead or village of a person named 'Svarri'.

The parish church is dedicated to Saint Mary and All Saints and is a Grade II* listed building dating from the 13th century. It was restored in 1886 and the south aisle dates from the same time. The west tower is 15th-century. On the north wall of the chancel is a rectangular ashlar wall plaque to Anthony Williams who died in 1681.

Swarby CE School was built in 1859, and closed in 1971.

A tornado swept through the village on 28 June 2012. It uprooted many trees, lifted a trampoline hundreds of feet and caused a garage roof to collapse while removing tiles from houses.

== Notable people ==
The entertainer Joe Brown was born at Swarby on 13 May 1941. Despite being referred to as a Cockney, Brown is a Lincolnshire Yellowbelly.
