= Peter Sterry =

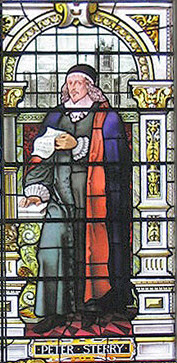
Peter Sterry

Peter Sterry (1613 – 19 November 1672) was an English independent theologian, associated with the Cambridge Platonists prominent during the English Civil War era. He was chaplain to Parliamentarian general Robert Greville, 2nd Baron Brooke and then Oliver Cromwell, a member of the Westminster Assembly, and a leading radical Puritan preacher attached to the English Council of State. He was made fun of in Hudibras.

== Life ==
He was born in Surrey. He went to St. Olave's Grammar School, Southwark. He was a Fellow of Emmanuel College, Cambridge, from 1636, where he had studied since 1629; but gave up the fellowship quite soon.

He preached to Parliament on important occasions: in 1649 after the surrender of Drogheda and Waterford, in 1651 after the battle of Worcester. His sermons, widely allusive, were considered opaque: David Masson quotes a contemporary opinion:

Of Sterry's preaching, already notoriously obscure, Sir Benjamin Rudyard had said that "it was too high for this world and too low for the other" […]

After the Restoration, he retired to a community in East Sheen. He took part in preaching, for example at Hackney and conventicles.

Literary historian Vivian de Sola Pinto observes that Sterry "had exactly the qualities that Puritans like Bunyan lacked: intellectual freedom, flexibility of mind, imagination, tolerance and loving-kindness." Sterry "united with this tenderness a wide culture, a true humanist's delight in learning and a love of beauty in all its manifestations."

He is commemorated by a stained glass window in the chapel of Emmanuel College, which has an archive of unpublished writings.

== Views ==
Described as a 'Platonizing Puritan', an 'Origenian universalist,' as well as a Behmenist (despite disagreeing with Böhme on much), he was a follower of leading Cambridge Platonist Benjamin Whichcote. As a mystic, he spoke of 'hidden music'. A millenarian, he expected in the early 1650s the Second Coming shortly, with 1656 a decisive year.

He with William Erbery 'had difficulty in distinguishing themselves from Ranters'; but he wrote against Ranter 'errors'. He was a sympathiser with early Quakerism, and preached in their defence when James Nayler was under attack by MPs at the parliament of 1656.

Robin Parry summarizes: "In many ways Sterry is an anomaly—a Puritan who was a lover of the arts and poetry, a Platonist who was a theological determinist, a deeply rational mystic, and a Calvinist universalist."

The following excerpt exemplifies Sterry's thought and style:

The divine love covers all things with the divine loveliness and beauty of the universal harmony, which is the righteousness of God in Christ, the first, the fairest image of the invisible God, in which every other image of God stands, as in the original, the all-comprehending glory.

== Family ==
The Oxford academic Nathaniel Sterry was his younger brother.

== Works ==
- The Spirit Convincing of Sinne, fast sermon for Parliament, 26 November 1645
- England's Deliverance from the Northern Presbytery, Compared with its Deliverance from the Roman Papacy (1652) sermon on the Battle of Worcester
- Way of God with his people in these nations, sermon for Parliament 5 November 1656
- Free Grace Exalted (1670)
- A Discourse of the Freedom of the Will (1675)
- The Rise, Race, and Royalty of the Kingdom of God in the Soul (1683)
- The Appearance of God to Man in the Gospel (1710)
