= Joe Brown (musician) =

English rock musician (born 1941)

Joe Brown MBE
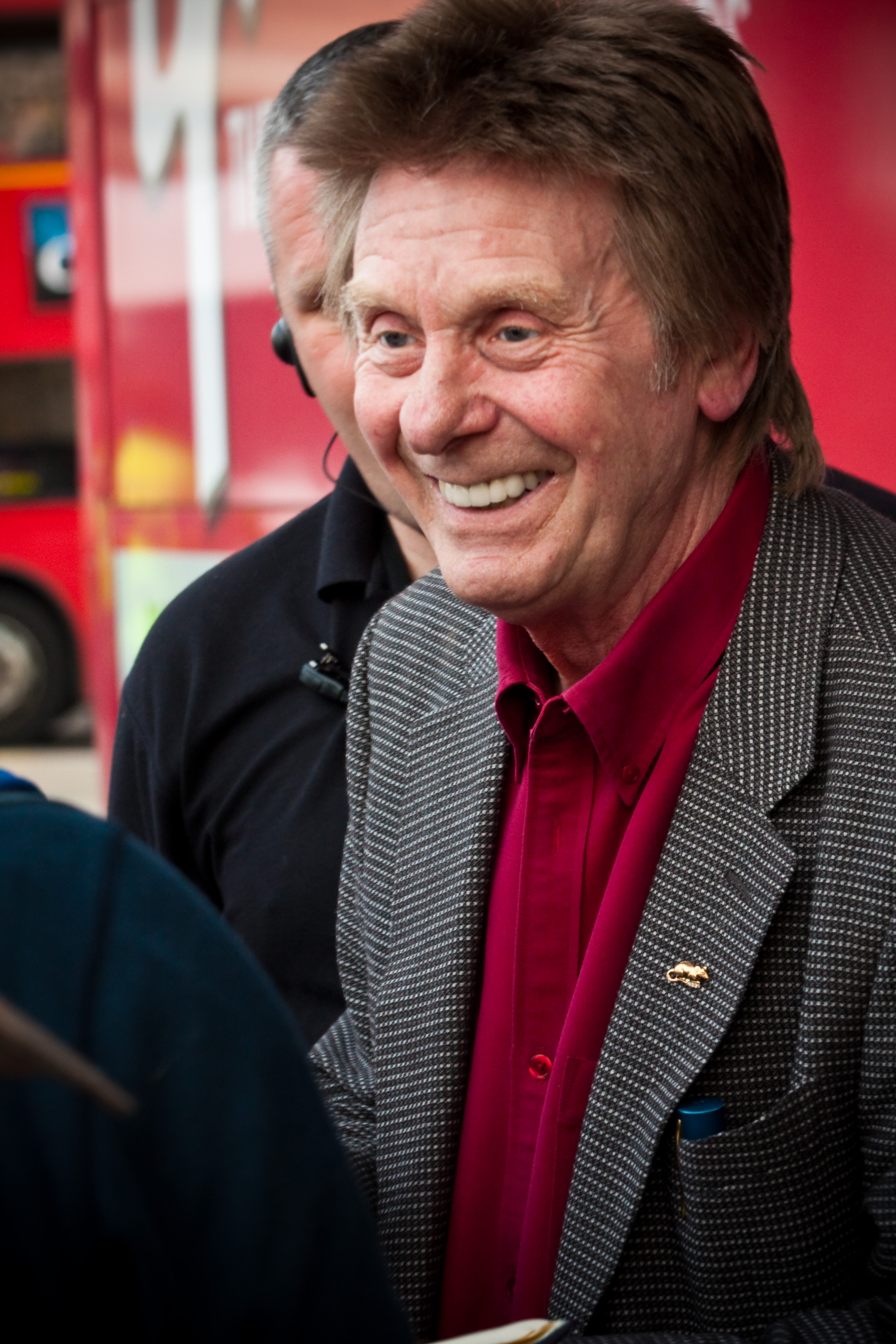
- Brown in 2010
- Born: Joseph Roger Brown; 13 May 1941 (age 85); Swarby, Lincolnshire, England
- Years active: 1959–present
- Spouses: Vicki Brown (died 1991); Manon Pearcey (m. 2000)
- Children: 2, including Sam
- Musical career
- Genres: Rock and roll; skiffle; beat; rhythm and blues; blues; pop rock
- Instruments: Vocals; guitar; ukulele; banjo; mandolin; fiddle
- Website: joebrown.co.uk

Joseph Roger Brown MBE (born 13 May 1941) is an English musician. As a rock and roll singer and guitarist, he has performed for more than six decades. He was a stage and television performer in the late 1950s and has primarily been a recording star since the early 1960s. He has made six films, presented specialist radio series for BBC Radio 2, appeared on the West End stage alongside Dame Anna Neagle and has written an autobiography. He has again concentrated on recording and performing music, playing two tours of around 100 shows every year and releasing an album almost every year.

Described by the Guinness Book of British Hit Singles & Albums as a "chirpy Cockney" (although he was born in Lincolnshire), Brown was one of the original artists managed by the early rock impresario and manager Larry Parnes. He is highly regarded in the music business as a "musician's musician" who "commands respect and admiration from a wide spectrum of artists".

== Early life ==
Brown was born in Swarby, Lincolnshire. His family moved to London when he was two and ran the Sultan public house in Grange Road, Plaistow, then in Essex, now part of the London Borough of Newham. In 1956, Brown formed a skiffle group, The Spacemen, which lasted until the skiffle movement faded towards the end of the 1950s. He worked for British Railways at their Plaistow Locomotive works for two years in the late 1950s, becoming a steam locomotive fireman. He left the job because "the smell of the diesels drove me out when they took over from steam".

== Career ==
In 1958, Brown was spotted by television producer Jack Good who hired him as lead guitarist in the orchestra of his new TV series, Boy Meets Girls. During this period, he backed a number of US musicians such as Gene Vincent and Eddie Cochran on their UK tours.

=== 1960s ===
Brown signed a management agreement with Larry Parnes. Parnes attempted to change Brown's stage name to 'Elmer Twitch', a story which Brown still refers to on occasion during his live sets. Brown signed to Decca Records. He charted with "The Darktown Strutters' Ball" in 1960, and had UK Top 10 hits on the Piccadilly label in 1962–63 with "A Picture of You", which reached number one on the NME charts (the main chart of the day); "It Only Took A Minute", and "That's What Love Will Do" (written by Trevor Peacock). Piccadilly's release of Brown's "Crazy Mixed Up Kid" in April 1961 was the label's first single. Brown's recording band was a collection of session musicians, and was named the Bruvvers by Jack Good, to give Brown the identity of having his own backing band for record releases. It was in 1962, when he needed a band to tour with him, that 'Joe Brown and the Bruvvers' was cemented, containing two members of the Spacemen, brothers Tony and Pete Oakman, who had also remained with him in the "Boy Meets Girls" band.

Brown was voted 'Top UK Vocal Personality' in the 1962 NME magazine poll. During the 1960s he appeared in a number of films, pantomime and stage musicals. In December 1963, the film What a Crazy World, based on a stage play, starring Brown and Marty Wilde among others, had its world premiere in London. Brown also starred in the hit musical Charlie Girl in the West End between 1965 and 1968; and in the musical comedy film Three Hats for Lisa in 1965 with Una Stubbs, Sophie Hardy and Sid James. He also made a cameo appearance as himself in the 1964 film The Beauty Jungle, and presented the children's television series Joe & Co on BBC Television.

=== 1970s and after ===
In 1972, he formed another band, Brown's Home Brew, which played rock and roll, country and gospel music and featured his wife, Vicki Brown, and Pete Oakman from the Bruvvers. This eclectic collection of musical styles, together with his hits, became the basis of his live sets ever since.

Brown was a regular guest on the revived Oh Boy! show in 1979 alongside Shakin' Stevens, Alvin Stardust, Lulu, Mr. Lee Grant, Freddie 'Fingers' Lee, Les Gray, Tim Whitnall, Johnny Storm, the Shades and Fumble.

In the 1980s, Brown presented a daytime quiz show on Granada TV called Square One; its success led him to recording a pilot for the prime time game show The Price Is Right but ATV selected Leslie Crowther for the full-time presenting role when the series launched.

He also hosted Show Me, an early evening game show produced by Anglia Television and aired on ITV for one series in 1987, and made a brief appearance as Dudley, a crooked club owner, in the 1986 film Mona Lisa, opposite Bob Hoskins.

George Harrison was best man at Brown's second wedding in 2000; Brown had appeared on two songs on Harrison's album Gone Troppo, and also was featured on a track on Harrison's last album, Brainwashed. Following Harrison's death from lung cancer on 29 November 2001, Brown appeared with his group at the Concert for George tribute, held on the first anniversary of his death. Brown played guitar whilst singing "Here Comes the Sun", mandolin on "That's The Way It Goes," and ukulele on the closing number, "I'll See You in My Dreams".

Brown still performs and makes occasional television appearances. In 2005, he co-wrote a musical, Don't You Rock Me Daddio, with songwriter Roger Cook, while in December 2006, he was one of three guest hosts of Sounds of the '60s on BBC Radio 2 during the absence of host Brian Matthew, having already presented two series on rock and roll for the same station.

In 2008, Brown's 50th anniversary celebrations included a UK gold album for sales over 100,000 copies of Joe Brown – The Very Best Of, a 37-date spring tour, an all-star concert at the Royal Albert Hall with Mark Knopfler, Jools Holland, Dennis Locorriere, Dave Edmunds, Sam Brown, Chas & Dave and others, and a 36-date autumn-winter tour.

His album More of the Truth was released in the UK on 13 October 2008 and, in 2009, the US musical instrument manufacturer Kala launched a series of 'Joe Brown' ukuleles. At the Mojo magazine's awards in London on 11 June 2009, Brown was presented with the lifetime award for outstanding contribution to music after 51 years' recording.

In late 2010, Brown was asked by Rick Parfitt of Status Quo to support them for the arena section (nine shows) of their UK tour in late 2010, and he continued to tour throughout 2011. A triple DVD and CD set of the latter tour was released of his show at the Liverpool Philharmonic.

In November 2011 Mojo's album Harrison Covered, released to mark the tenth anniversary of George Harrison's death, included Brown's recording of Harrison's "That's the Way It Goes".

in 2014 Brown pulled out of the Village Pump Folk Festival for medical reasons. He was replaced by Peatbog Faeries.

== Honours ==
Brown was appointed Member of the Order of the British Empire (MBE) for services to music in the 2009 Birthday Honours.

== Personal life ==
Brown married Victoria Mary Haseman, a singer with both the Vernons Girls and the Breakaways, who then became known as Vicki Brown. Latterly a session singer, she died of cancer in 1991. Their daughter, Sam Brown, is also a singer. Their son, Pete Brown, is a record producer, who produced all but one of Brown's nine most recent albums; Pete tours with his father. In 2000, Joe Brown married Manon Pearcey, former partner of the former Small Faces singer Steve Marriott.

== Discography ==
Studio albums

- A Picture of You (1962)
- Joe Brown / Mark Wynter (1963)
- Here Comes Joe! (1964)
- Joe Brown (1968)
- Brown's Home Brew (1972) (As Brown’s Home Brew)
- Together (1974) (As Brown’s Home Brew)
- Come On Joe (1992)
- Fifty Six and Taller Than You Think (1997)
- On a Day Like This (1999)
- Jiggery Pokery (2004)
- Hittin the High Spots (2004)
- Down to Earth (2006)
- More of the Truth (2008)
- The Ukulele Album (2012)

== Filmography ==
=== Film ===
Year	Title	Role	Notes
1963	What a Crazy World	Alf Hitchens	
1964	The Beauty Jungle	Himself as a Rose of England Judge	Uncredited
1965	Three Hats for Lisa	Johnny Howjego	
1968	Lionheart	Private Worms	
1986	Mona Lisa	Dudley	

=== Television ===
Year	Title	Role	Notes
1969	Armchair Theatre	Pete	One episode
1969	W. Somerset Maugham	Fred Manson	One episode
1977	The Sooty Show	Himself	One episode
