= Sir Paul Whichcote, 2nd Baronet =

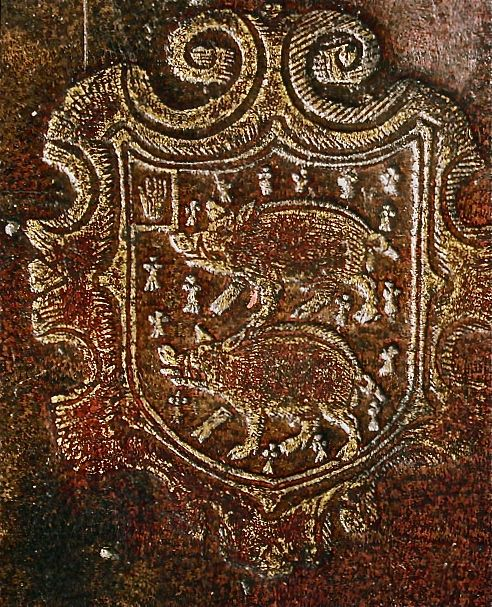
The arms of Sir Paul Whichcote, 2nd Baronet.

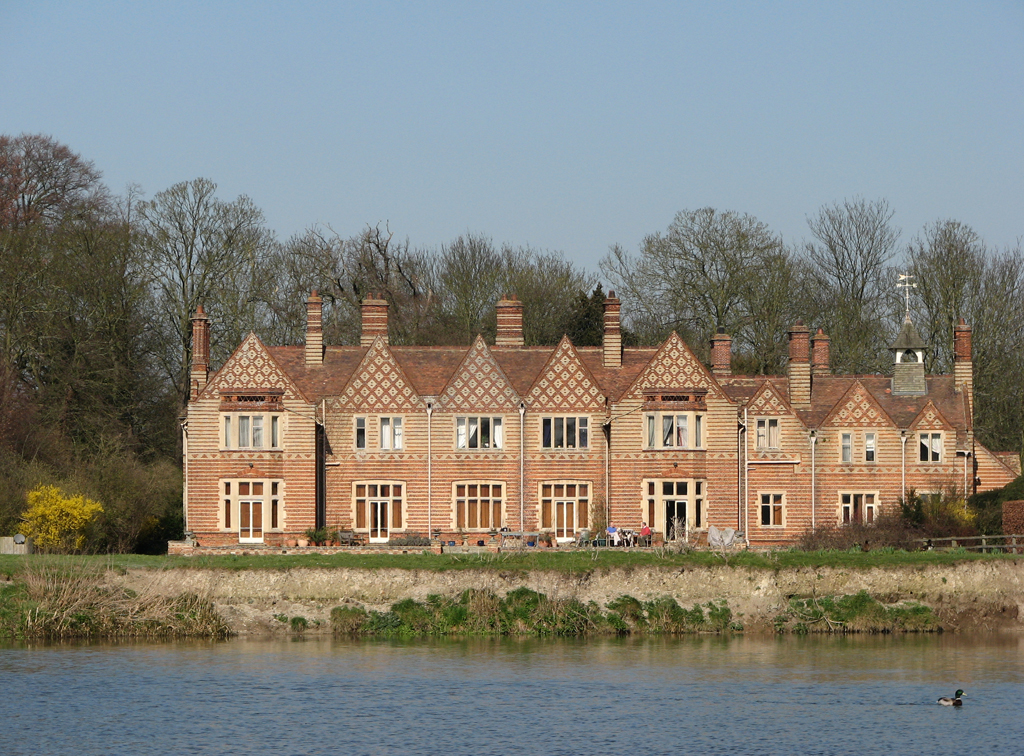
Quy Hall, Cambridgeshire.

Sir Paul Whichcote, 2nd Baronet (1643–1721), was a fellow of the Royal Society and the owner of the Manor of Totteridge in Hertfordshire.

== Early life and education ==
Paul Whichcote was born in 1643, the eldest son of Sir Jeremy Whichcote, 1st Baronet (c. 1614–1677), barrister-at-law and Solicitor-General to the Frederick V of the Palatinate, and Anne (died August 1714), eldest daughter and heir of Joseph Grave. His early life was at Quy Hall, Cambridgeshire. He was educated at King's College, University of Cambridge, where he was admitted as a Fellow Commoner in 1662. Whichcote was made a fellow of The Royal Society in 1674 and received his Master of Arts degree from Cambridge University in 1701.

== Marriage ==
Whichcote married Jane, daughter and heir of Sir Nicholas Gould, 1st Baronet, on 14 June 1677, and had several children. His heir was Sir Francis Whichcote, 3rd Baronet (c. 1692–1775).

== Hendon and Totteridge ==
Whichcote was resident at Hendon House, in the grounds of which Hendon School now stands. He inherited the house after the death of his father in 1677 and lived there until 1691.

By 1700, Whichcote was lord of the manor of Totteridge which he acquired from Sir Francis Pemberton and Isaac Foxcroft. He sold it to James Brydges, 1st Duke of Chandos, in 1720 or 1721.

== Death ==
Whichcote died in December 1721 and is buried at St Mary's Church, Hendon.

Baronetage of England
Preceded by Jeremy Whichcote	Baronet (of the Inner Temple); 1677 – 1721	Succeeded by Francis Whichcote
