= John Cage (Totteridge) =

John Cage was a citizen of London and the holder of the Manor of Totteridge in Hertfordshire, which was granted to him by Queen Elizabeth I in 1590 but lost to the Peacock family following a legal case.

== Early life and family ==
Cage was the second son of Anthony Cage, citizen and Salter of London. He had an elder brother, Anthony, of Longstow in Cambridgeshire. He married Jane, daughter of Richard Thornhill of Bromley, Kent, and had a son, Richard (still living in 1623), of Thames Ditton, who was married in London on 3 February 1596, to Jane Fowler, daughter of Lady Brocket by her first husband, Gabriel Fowler.

== Manor of Totteridge ==
The grant of the manor of Totteridge to John Cage was made by Queen Elizabeth I on 11 May 1590 out of the possessions of the Bishop of Ely, who surrendered it in return for an annuity of £1,500 to be paid to the Bishops of that see. From 1603, Cage and Richard Peacock fought a legal case over the ownership of the manor which resulted in it becoming vested in the Peacock family in 1606 or 1607. In 1591, he became a governor of Queen Elizabeth's School, in nearby Chipping Barnet. In 1593, John Cage of Totteridge, gentleman, was assessed to make a contribution to the defence of the kingdom of 40l.
