= Manor of Totteridge =

13th-century house in London, England

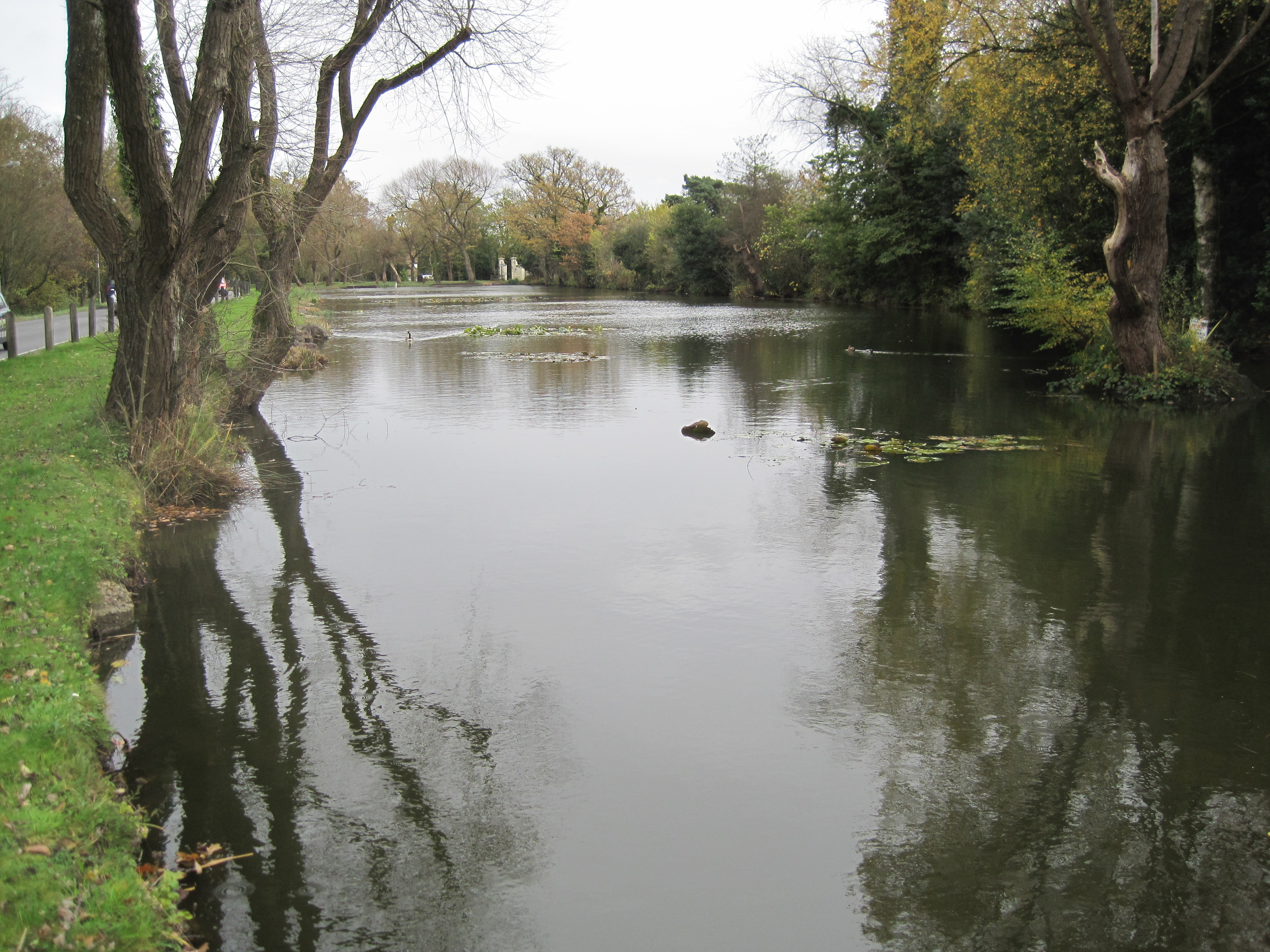
Long Pond on Totteridge Common

The Manor of Totteridge was located in Totteridge, Hertfordshire, in an area that is now part of the London Borough of Barnet. The manor was historically associated with the Manor of Hatfield. The original manor house was demolished before 1821 and the manorial estate known as Totteridge Common was transferred to a charity, the Totteridge Manor Association, in 1954.

== Early history ==
Totteridge Manor is not mentioned in the Domesday Book. The first record of it is in 1248, when Hugh of Northwold, Bishop of Ely received licence:

"that during any vacancy of the see four chaplains appointed by the said bishop to celebrate mass daily for the souls of the king and queen, his ancestors and successors, and for the souls of the bishop, his predecessors and successors, shall receive yearly from the issues of the manors of Totteridge and Brumford, which the said bishop bought for that purpose, 20 marks by the hands of the keepers of the said manors, 10 marks at Michaelmas at the Exchequer of Ely and 10 marks at Lady Day."

It seems probable that the bishop had bought out the under-tenant and that the manor had always been an outlying member of Hatfield, for as parochially Totteridge was a chapelry of Hatfield there must have been some ancient connection between the two places, and in 1277 it was returned as "accustomed to return half a knight's fee in the manor of Hatfield." In the second half of the 13th century, the manor seems to have been held by Laurence de Brok for life, for in 1275, Matilda, widow of Laurence, claimed a third of the manor in dower from Bishop Hugh and had it duly delivered. Possibly Laurence de Brok was the tenant who sold the manor to the Bishop of Ely.

== Lords of the Manor ==
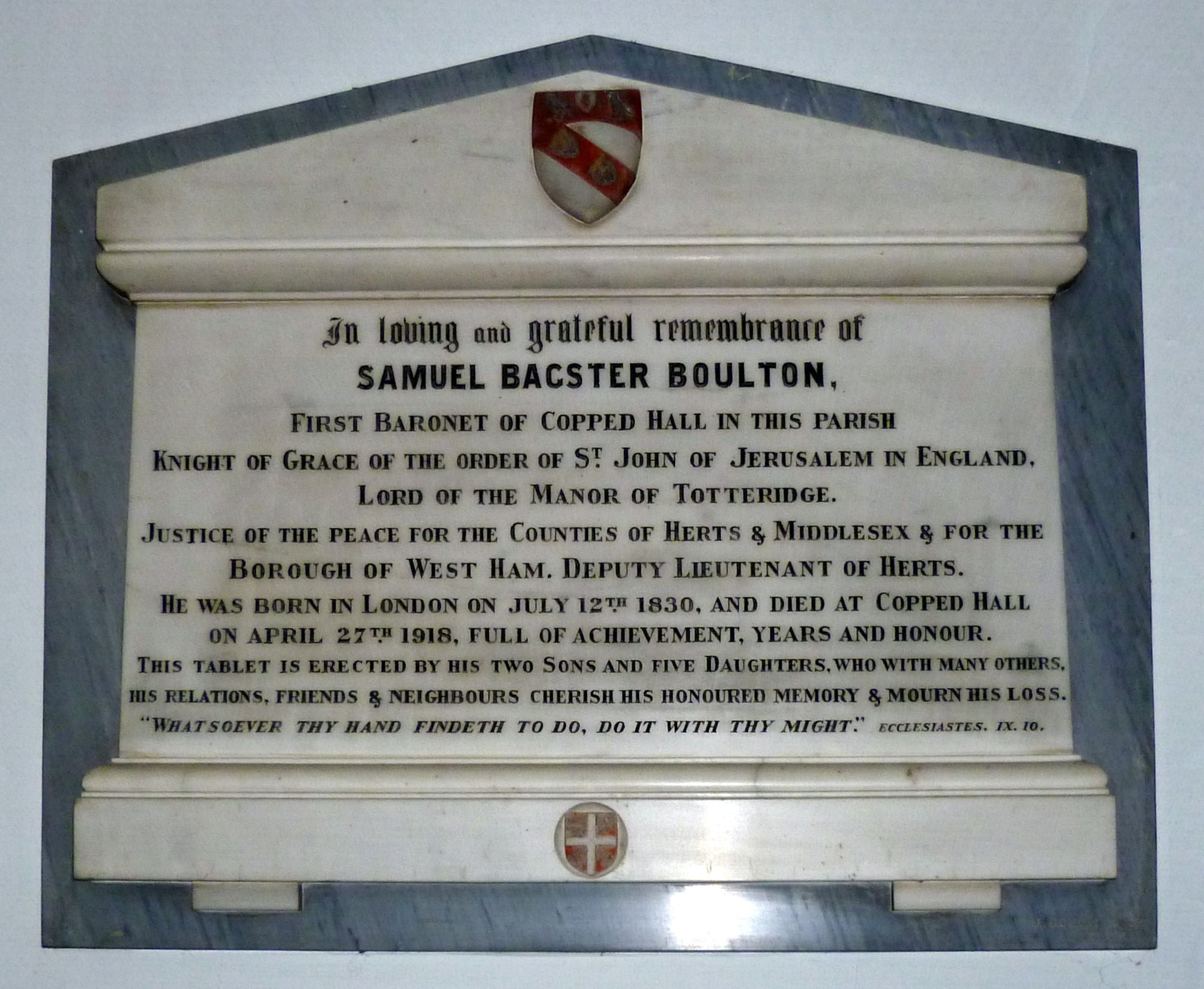
Samuel Bagster Boulton plaque in St Andrew's church, Totteridge.

The Bishops of Ely continued to hold the manor until 1561, being allowed to keep it when the manor of Hatfield was sold to the king in 1538. In 1561, however, Totteridge was acquired by Queen Elizabeth in exchange for a pension to the bishop. Before this a lease of the manor had been granted by the Bishop of Ely to John Brockett, who sold it some time later to Richard Peacock for £1,100.

In 1579–80 Elizabeth granted the court leet and view of frankpledge and the profits of the manor to John Moore for twenty-one years, and in 1590 she granted the manor to John Cage, to hold for one-twentieth of a knight's fee, of the honour of Hampton Court. About 1603 John Cage and Richard Peacock had a prolonged lawsuit for the possession of the manor. John and Katherine Cage and Richard their son and heir released their right in 1607, apparently in favour of the Peacocks, for it seems to have descended to another Richard Peacock, who married Rechard Grigge, who was holding the manor in 1678 and died before 1689. Rechard had fourteen children, and, surviving her husband and all her sons, sold Totteridge in that year to Sir Francis Pemberton and Isaac Foxcroft.

They apparently conveyed it to Sir Paul Whichcote, who was lord of the manor in 1700. The latter sold Totteridge in 1720–1 to James Duke of Chandos, from whom it passed to his son Henry in 1744. Henry Duke of Chandos conveyed it in 1748 to Sir William Lee, Lord Chief Justice of the King's Bench, who was succeeded by his son William, and before 1786 by his grandson, also Sir William Lee, who took the additional surname of Antonie. Sir William Lee Antonie died in 1815, when Totteridge passed to his nephew John Fiott, the son of his sister Harriet and John Fiott. This John, who was a scientist and collector of antiquities, assumed the surname of Lee, and was holding the manor in 1821, Upon his death without children in 1866 Totteridge was inherited by his brother the Rev. Nicholas Fiott, who also took the name of Lee. Sir Samuel Boulton, bart., was the lord of the manor in 1912.

== The Manor House and estate ==
A capital messuage, held of the manor of Totteridge by knight's service, was purchased from the trustees of John Cage at the beginning of the 17th century by Hugh Hare and his brother John, who were jointly seized of it. John Hare died in 1613, leaving his house in Totteridge to his honest bailiff Richard Hare and his wife for their lives, after which it seems to have passed to his son Hugh Hare, who in 1625 was created Lord Coleraine. The latter died and was buried at Totteridge in 1667, and was succeeded by his son Henry Hare, second Lord Coleraine, who died in 1708. At the death of Henry Hare, grandson of the second baron, in 1749 the peerage became extinct. The house is said to have been afterwards the residence of Sir Robert Atkyns, Lord Chief Baron of the Exchequer, but it was pulled down shortly before 1821 and another house built on its site by John Fiott, lord of the manor of Totteridge.

The manorial lands known as Totteridge Common were transferred to a charity, the Totteridge Manor Association, in 1954.

== Manorial life ==
Free warren was granted to the Bishop of Ely at Totteridge in 1250–51. About 1580, the office of keeper of the pheasants and partridges was surrendered by Augustine Sparks and was granted to John Pratt, with a fee of 4d, a day and £1 6s. 8d. for a yearly livery coat. In 1611, the reversion of this office was granted in survivorship to Alban Coxe and John his son.

Totteridge seems to have had courts of its own separate from the manor of Hatfield, although view of frankpledge is not mentioned in connection with it until 1580, when court leet and view of frankpledge were granted by Elizabeth I to John Moore for twenty-one years, for a rent of 3s. 4d. The rights of the Bishops of Ely in Hatfield probably extended to Totteridge as a member of that manor.
