= Aswarby =

Village in the North Kesteven district of Lincolnshire, England

Coordinates: 52.944900°N 0.413589°W

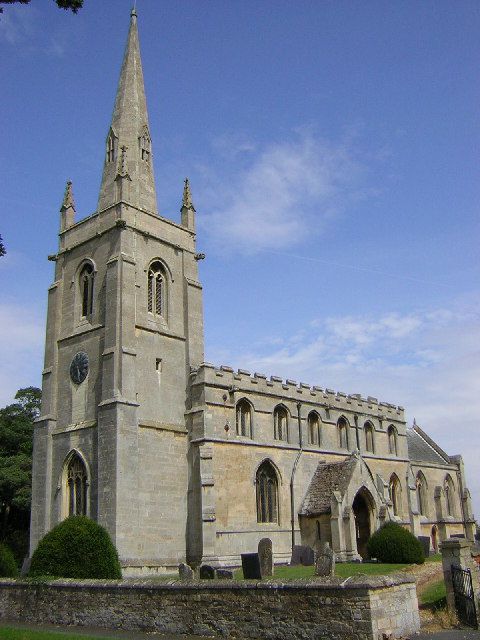
- St Denys' Church, Aswarby

- Location within Lincolnshire
- OS grid reference: TF066397
  - London: 100 mi (160 km) S
- Civil parish: Aswarby and Swarby
- District: North Kesteven
- Shire county: Lincolnshire
- Region: East Midlands
- Country: England
- Sovereign state: United Kingdom
- Post town: Sleaford
- Postcode district: NG34
- Dialling code: 01529
- Police: Lincolnshire
- Fire: Lincolnshire
- Ambulance: East Midlands
- UK Parliament: Sleaford and North Hykeham

Aswarby (/ˈæzərbi/) is a village in the civil parish of Aswarby and Swarby, in the North Kesteven district of Lincolnshire, England. It is 3.5 miles (5.6 km) south of Sleaford and 750 yards (690 m) east of the A15 road, between Sleaford and the point near Threekingham where it crosses the A52 road. In 1921 the parish had a population of 90.

== History ==
The village may take its name from the old Danish name Aswarth; it was originally an ecclesiastical parish within the ancient Aswardhun wapentake of the Danelaw. Although there is no firm evidence of earlier occupation, a flint axe and a 2nd-century AD Roman brooch were found near Aswarby.

The village is recorded in the Domesday Book of 1086 as "Aswardebi". In the mid-19th century, it was moved to a new site to make way for improvements to Aswarby Park; the original position is about 500 yards to the south-west of the modern village.

On 1 April 1931 the parish was abolished to form "Aswarby and Swarby", part also went to form "Aunsby and Dembleby".

== Landmarks ==
The Anglican church of St Denys is in Aswarby; it has been a Grade I listed building since 1967. Parts of the church date back to the 12th, 14th and 15th centuries. The font is 12th century with a 20th-century lid, and the chancel, designed by H. E. Kendall, was built in 1849. In 1850 the church was restored by Edward Blore. There are memorials to George Bass and members of the Whichcote family.

Aswarby Hall was the seat of the Hervey and Carr (or Carre) families. Sir Francis Whichcote, 3rd Baronet moved there in the early 1700s. By the mid-19th century, it had descended to Sir Thomas Whichcote, 7th Baronet and High Sheriff of Lincolnshire. It is the setting for "Lost Hearts", a ghost story by M. R. James, a writer of supernatural short fiction. The hall itself was demolished in 1951, leaving only two pillars standing. The surrounding park remains and is owned by Aswarby Estates.

The surviving estate properties are included in Aswarby's inventory of 19 Grade II listed buildings, which includes the Estate Office, several farmhouses, cottages, The Old Smithy, a walled garden and bothy, and a milestone. 13 of the village's listed buildings are in a conservation area, as defined by Heritage Lincolnshire.

== Notable people ==
George Bass, explorer of Australia and Tasmania, was born in Aswarby; Bass Strait was named after him.
