= Francis Whichcote =

English politician

Sir Francis Whichcote, 3rd Baronet (c.1692-1775), of Quy Hall, Cambridgeshire and Aswarby, Lincolnshire, was an English politician who sat in the House of Commons from 1718 to 1722.

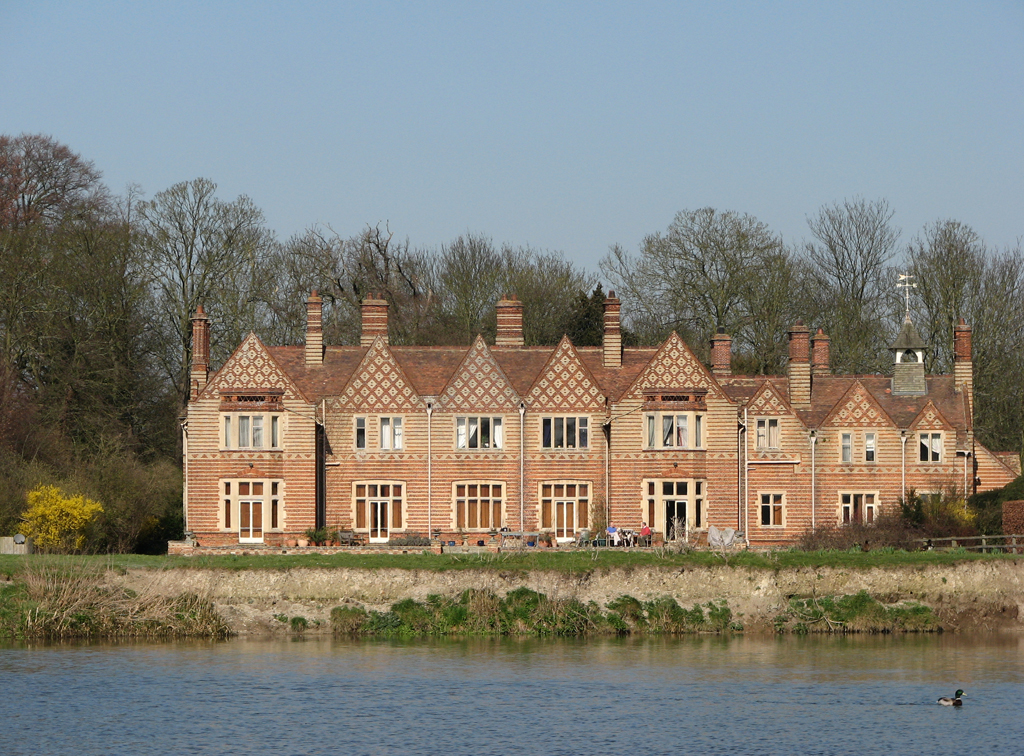
Quy Hall, Cambridgeshire

Whichcote was the eldest surviving son of Sir Paul Whichcote, 2nd Baronet and his wife Jane Gould, the daughter and coheiress of Sir Nicholas Gould, 1st Baronet. He was admitted at St Catharine's College, Cambridge in 1708, at Trinity Hall, Cambridge in 1711 and at the Inner Temple in 1714. In 1717, he married Mary Banks, the daughter of Joseph Banks of Revesby Abbey, Lincolnshire. He succeeded his father in 1721, inheriting Quy Hall, Cambridgeshire.

Whichcote was returned as Member of Parliament for Cambridgeshire at a by-election on 27 November 1718 and voted with the government. He was defeated at the 1722 general election, and did not stand again.

Whichcote sold Quy Hall to James Martin, MP and moved to live at Aswarby Hall, Lincolnshire.

His wife Mary died on 9 September 1726. He married as his second wife in 1737, Frances Lady Hickman, widow of Sir Nevile Hickman, 4th Baronet of Gainsborough, Lincolnshire and daughter of Edward Hall. He had two sons by his second wife and was succeeded by his eldest son, Sir Christopher Whichcote, 4th Baronet. Whichcote died on 27 October 1775 and is buried at St Denys, Aswarby, Lincolnshire.

Parliament of Great Britain
Preceded by John Bromley; Robert Clarke	Member of Parliament for Cambridgeshire; 1718–1722; With: Robert Clarke	Succeeded by Sir John Hynde Cotton, Bt; Lord Harley
Baronetage of England
Preceded by Paul Whichcote	Baronet (of the Inner Temple); 1721 – 1775	Succeeded by Christopher Whichcote
