= Aswarby and Swarby =

Civil parish in Lincolnshire, England

Coordinates: 52.95°N 0.42°W

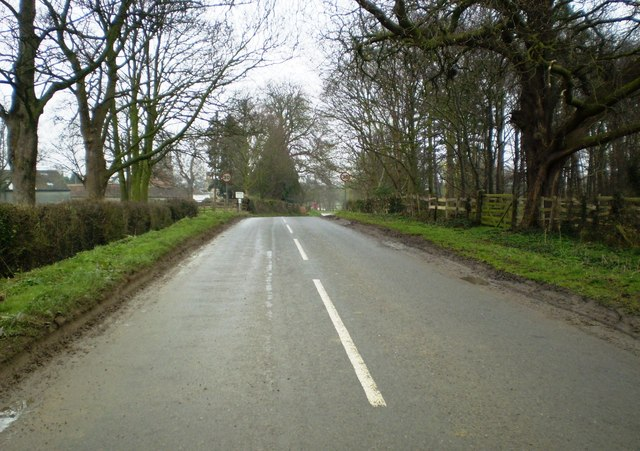
- Road leading into Swarby

- Location within Lincolnshire
- Population: 237 (2011 Census)
- OS grid reference: TF055408
  - London: 100 mi (160 km) S
- District: North Kesteven
- Shire county: Lincolnshire
- Region: East Midlands
- Country: England
- Sovereign state: United Kingdom
- Post town: Sleaford
- Postcode district: NG34
- Dialling code: 01529
- Police: Lincolnshire
- Fire: Lincolnshire
- Ambulance: East Midlands

Aswarby and Swarby is a civil parish in the North Kesteven district of Lincolnshire, England. Aswarby (pronounced locally as "as-r-bee") is the ecclesiastical parish formed in 1850 from the two ancient parishes of Asarby and Swarby. The civil parish of Aswarby and Swarby does not include the hamlet of Crofton, just next door in Aunsby and Dembleby. The parish therefore consists of only Aswarby and Swarby, and a number of farms and plantations.

The villages of Aswarby and Swarby lie 3.5 miles (6 km) from Sleaford, the closest town to them, and 14 miles (23 km) from Grantham. The nearest station to Aswarby and Swarby is that of Rauceby, approximately 8 miles (13 km) north from the village.

Aswarby should not be confused with Aswardby, which is also in Lincolnshire, but about 35 miles (56 km) North-East of Aswarby.

Aswarby (St. Denis), is a parish in the union of Sleaford, wapentake of Aswardhurn, parts of Kesteven, county of Lincoln, 4 miles (N. by W.) from Folkingham.

== History ==
The names Aswarby and Swarby directly translate to two previous farm owners within each area. The letters 'by' translate to a farmstead or village with the letters preceding relating to the specific person's name. Aswarby originally meant 'Asvarth's farm/settlement' and Swarby 'Svarri's farm/settlement'.

Aswarby and Swarby is recorded once in the 1986 BBC Domesday Reloaded, a forum-style local history website where members of the public uploaded their individual and personal views. Anonymous contributors described the parish as "two small villages east and west of the Sleaford/Bourne road." Aswarby is described as an "estate village with areas of natural beauty, daffodils and grass and where sheep and cattle regularly graze." Swarby is described as having few new houses. The population of both villages are probably half land workers with the remainder commuting to Sleaford or Grantham. Within Domesday Reloaded, a personal opinion states: "although a daily bus service runs, without private transport you are somewhat isolated."

== Governance ==
The parish lies within the Sleaford and North Hykeham constituency. It is also within the Sleaford Rural South electoral division of North Kesteven County Council.

== Demography ==
The first recorded census data available for Aswarby and Swarby is the 1921 Census, which recorded the population as 233. In 1931 the population had reduced by 32 to 201, followed by further reduction in 1951 to 188, and 1961 to 163. By 2011 the population had increased to its highest recorded, with a total of 237. Out of the 237 people recorded in the census 98.7% described themselves as White British. Out of the 237 people living in the Parish there was only one noted religion followed, Christianity at 75.9%, with 19% saying they followed no religion while 5.1% chose not to state their religion.

== Landmarks ==
=== The Tally Ho Inn ===
The Tally Ho Inn is a place of interest that lies in Aswarby, a mile from Swarby. Believed to have been built in the 1750s it was originally a working farm, with the conversion from farm to inn occurring by 1889. The Tally Ho Inn is the only pub/restaurant in the county of Lincolnshire to be listed in the Egon Ronay Guide 2006 that particularly commends the policy of sourcing produce locally.

=== Aswarby Park ===
Aswarby Park is a conservation area incorporating parkland from the former Aswarby House as well as a number of residential properties on Wood Lane and Main Street. The conservation area covers a total of 77.18 hectares. The park was improved and expanded in the 19th century and the village of Aswarby was moved to make way for it; the original position is about 500 yards to the south-west of the present village. The park has much natural beauty including many fine mature oak trees.
