= Nathaniel Culverwell =

English author and theologian (1619–1651)

Nathaniel Culverwell (alternative spellings Nathanael or Culverwel; 1619–1651) was an English author and theologian, born in Middlesex.

He was the second of six children of Richard and Margaret (Horton) Culverwell. He was baptized on 14 January 1619 at the church of St. Margaret Moses where his father was rector.

He was a student (admitted 1633) and later a fellow of Emmanuel College, Cambridge. He was associated with members of the Cambridge Platonists group.

Culverwell was one of the first people in England to read Descartes, and the first of the Cambridge Platonists to publish his own ideas; he believed in free will, the intrinsic goodness of all things, and that both the soul and the ability to reason come from God.

== Works ==
- Spiritual Optics, or a Glass Discovering the Weakness and Imperfection of a Christian's Knowledge in this Life, 1651
- An Elegant and Learned Discourse of the Light of Nature, 1652 – His best-known work, this was originally delivered as a series of lectures in 1645–1646, and attempted mediation between reason and faith, via natural law, in the context of the opposing religious stances of the English Civil War.
- Worth of Souls
- The Schisme
- Act of Oblivion
- Child's Return
- Panting Soul
- Mount Ebal
- White Stone
