= Totteridge Common =

Nature reserve in north London, England

Coordinates: 51.6315°N 0.2227°W

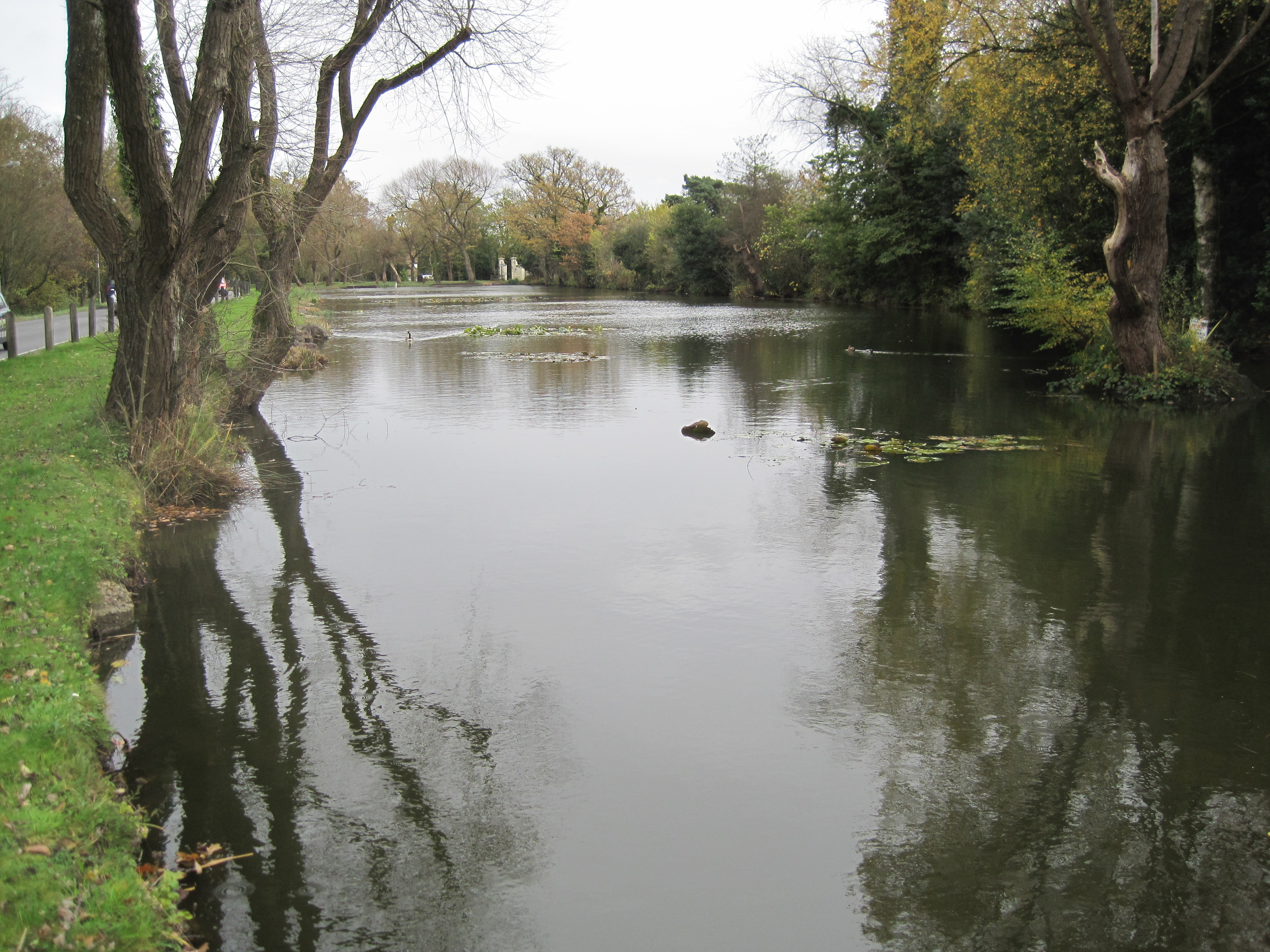
Long Pond

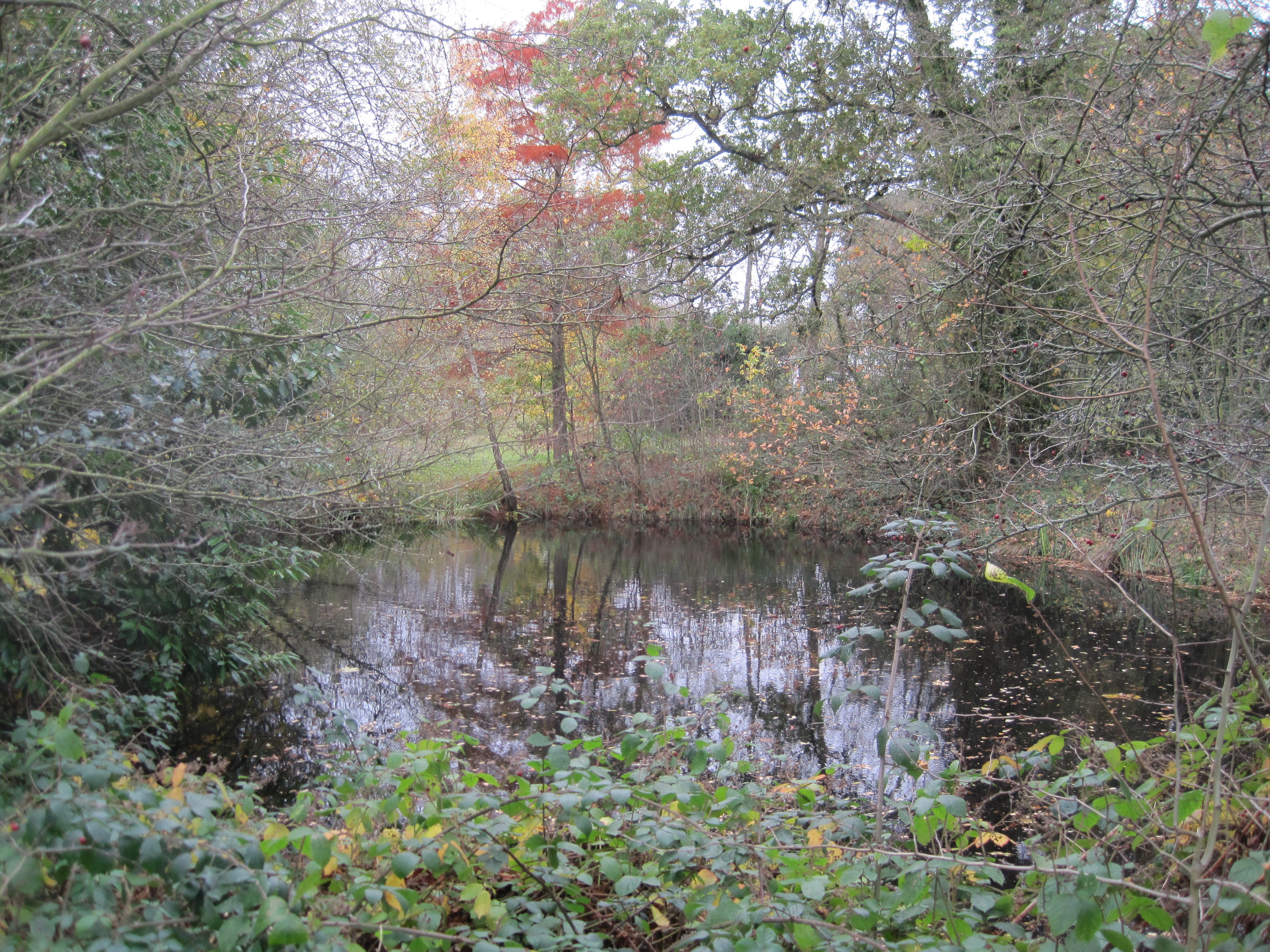
Pink Cottage Pond

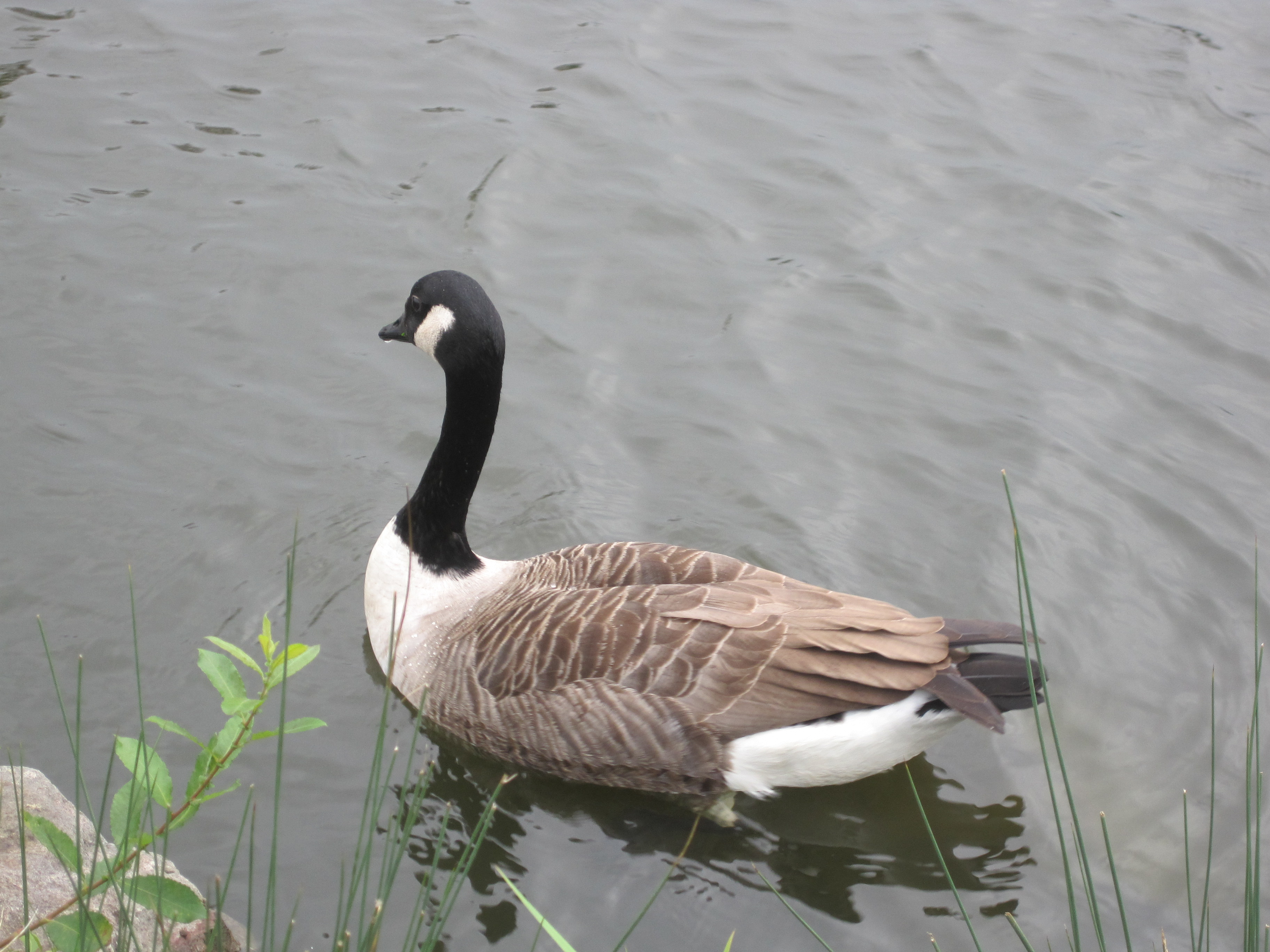
Canada Goose on Long Pond

Totteridge Common is a 3.7 hectare Site of Borough Importance for Nature Conservation, Grade II, in Totteridge in the London Borough of Barnet. The nature reserve is the southern verge of the road Totteridge Common, between Totteridge Park and Oak Lodge. It is registered common land owned by the Totteridge Manor Association and comprised the lands of the former Manor of Totteridge which were transferred to the association in 1954.

== Ecology ==
The most interesting feature ecologically is a chain of old ponds. Starting from the east, they are Burnham's Pond, Warren Pond, Long Pond, Ellern Mede Pond and Pink Cottage Pond. They vary in character, but all have interesting wetland flora, and most are valuable for dragonflies, other invertebrates and amphibians. Plants to be found around the edges of the ponds include lesser spearwort, trifid bur-marigold and fool's watercress (Apium nodiflorum). In deeper water, white water-lily and curled and broad-leaved pondweeds can be found. Long Pond is used for angling.

The common also has grassland, scattered trees, overgrown hedgerows and several pockets of scrubby woodland. The woodland is mainly composed of sycamore and elm. Other trees include two young native black poplar (Populus nigra ssp betulifolia), a rare tree in Britain and a priority species in the London Biodiversity Action Plan. There are also some fine mature oaks and horse-chestnuts scattered throughout the common. The grassland has a fairly good range of wild flowers, and damp areas near some of the ponds contain much tufted hair-grass.

== See also ==
- Nature reserves in Barnet
