= Whichcote baronets =

Extinct baronetcy in the Baronetage of England

- Escutcheon of the Whichcote baronets of the Inner Temple
- Creation date: 1660
- Status: extinct
- Extinction date: 1949
- Motto: Juste et droit, Just and right

The Whichcote Baronetcy, of the Inner Temple in the City of London, was a title in the Baronetage of England. It was created on 2 April 1660 to reward Sir Jeremy Whichcote for his services to the exiled King Charles II. Whichcote, previously Solicitor-General to Prince Rupert of the Rhine, bought the post of Warden of Fleet Prison and, during the Commonwealth, was able to shelter the king's friends and agents in this way.

The third Baronet sat as Member of Parliament for Cambridgeshire. The fourth Baronet was High Sheriff of Lincolnshire in 1777, the fifth baronet in 1790, the seventh Baronet in 1837 and the ninth Baronet in 1900. The title became extinct on the death of the tenth Baronet in 1949.

Benjamin Whichcote was the elder brother of the first Baronet.

== Whichcote baronets, of the Inner Temple (1660) ==
- Sir Jeremy Whichcote, 1st Baronet (c. 1614–1677)
- Sir Paul Whichcote, 2nd Baronet (1643–1721)
- Sir Francis Whichcote, 3rd Baronet (c. 1692–1775)
- Sir Christopher Whichcote, 4th Baronet (1738–1786)

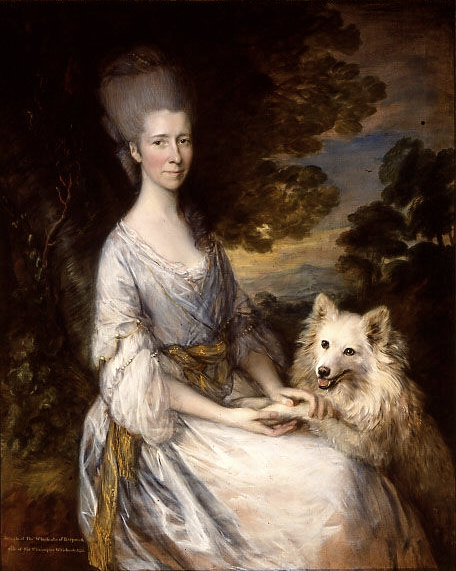
Jane, Lady Whichcote, 1775 portrait by Thomas Gainsborough

- Sir Thomas Whichcote, 5th Baronet (1763–1828)
- Sir Thomas Whichcote, 6th Baronet (1787–1829)
- Sir Thomas Whichcote, 7th Baronet (1813–1892)
- Sir George Whichcote, 8th Baronet (1817–1893)
- Sir George Whichcote, 9th Baronet (1870–1946)
- Sir Hugh Christopher Whichcote, 10th Baronet (1874–1949)
