= Ezechiel Foxcroft =

English esotericist (1633–1676)

Ezechiel Foxcroft (1633, London – 1676) was an English esotericist who produced the first translation of the Chymical Wedding of Christian Rosenkreutz published in 1690.

== Life ==
He was the son of the prominent merchant George Foxcroft, and his wife, Elizabeth Whichcote, sister of Benjamin Whichcote and Jeremy Whichcote. After attending school at Eton he then continued to King's College, Cambridge. He gained his BA in 1652 when he became a Fellow of the College, gaining his MA in 1656. He was appointed lecturer in mathematics. He became senior proctor of Cambridge University in 1673, but retired from his academic positions in 1674.
