= Quy Hall =

Country house in Stow cum Quy, England

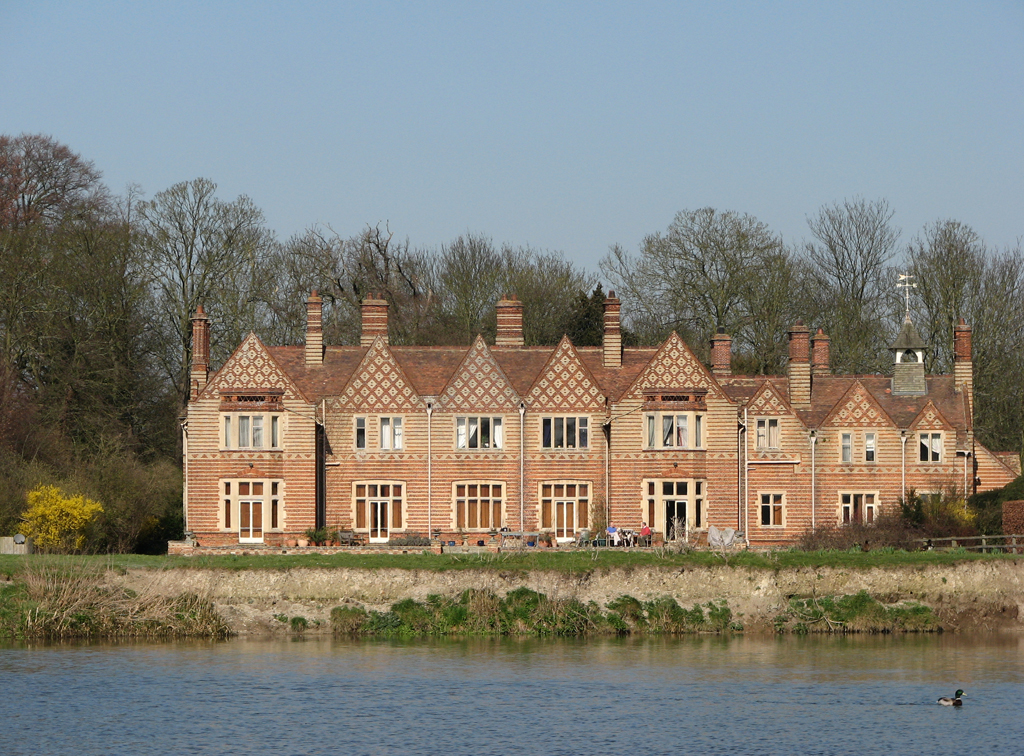
- Interactive map of the Quy Hall area

General information
- Type: Country House
- Location: Stow cum Quy
- Coordinates: 52.227571°N 0.217274°E
- Completed: 1870

Technical details
- Material: Brick with tiled roof

Design and construction
- Designations: Grade II* listed

Quy Hall is a Grade II* listed English country house at Stow cum Quy, Cambridgeshire. Originally dating from the late 15th century, it was completely remodelled in 1870. It stands in its own grounds overlooking a lake in the Quy Water.

== History ==
A manor house known as Quy Hall had stood on the site since the late 15th century. In the 17th century the hall was occupied by the Whichcote baronets. Sir Francis Whitchcote, 3rdBt, sold it to James Martin, a London banker in 1720. In 1854, the Martins sold it on to Clement Francis, a Cambridge solicitor, who carried out the substantial rebuilding to designs by William White. The grounds were also progressively extended to cover some 135 acres (55 ha) by the late 19th century. The property has passed down in the Francis family ever since.

== Architecture ==
The hall is constructed in two storeys to an H-shaped plan of yellow gault brick with plain red roof tiles. It originally dates to the 15th century, and some of the roof trusses remain from that era as well as 16th-century ones in the south front roof. The end crosswing gables, three central gables and three service range gables are all in chequered patterned brickwork. In the 1870s the house was completely remodelled by William White and what is believed to be decorator Thomas Gambier Parry, who decorated and painted the drawing room, dining room and library. Gambier Parry was staying in the vicinity during his work on Ely Cathedral. 18th-century doors remain on the dining room. Both of the staircases and fireplaces were designed by White.
