= Fleet Prison =

12th-century prison in London

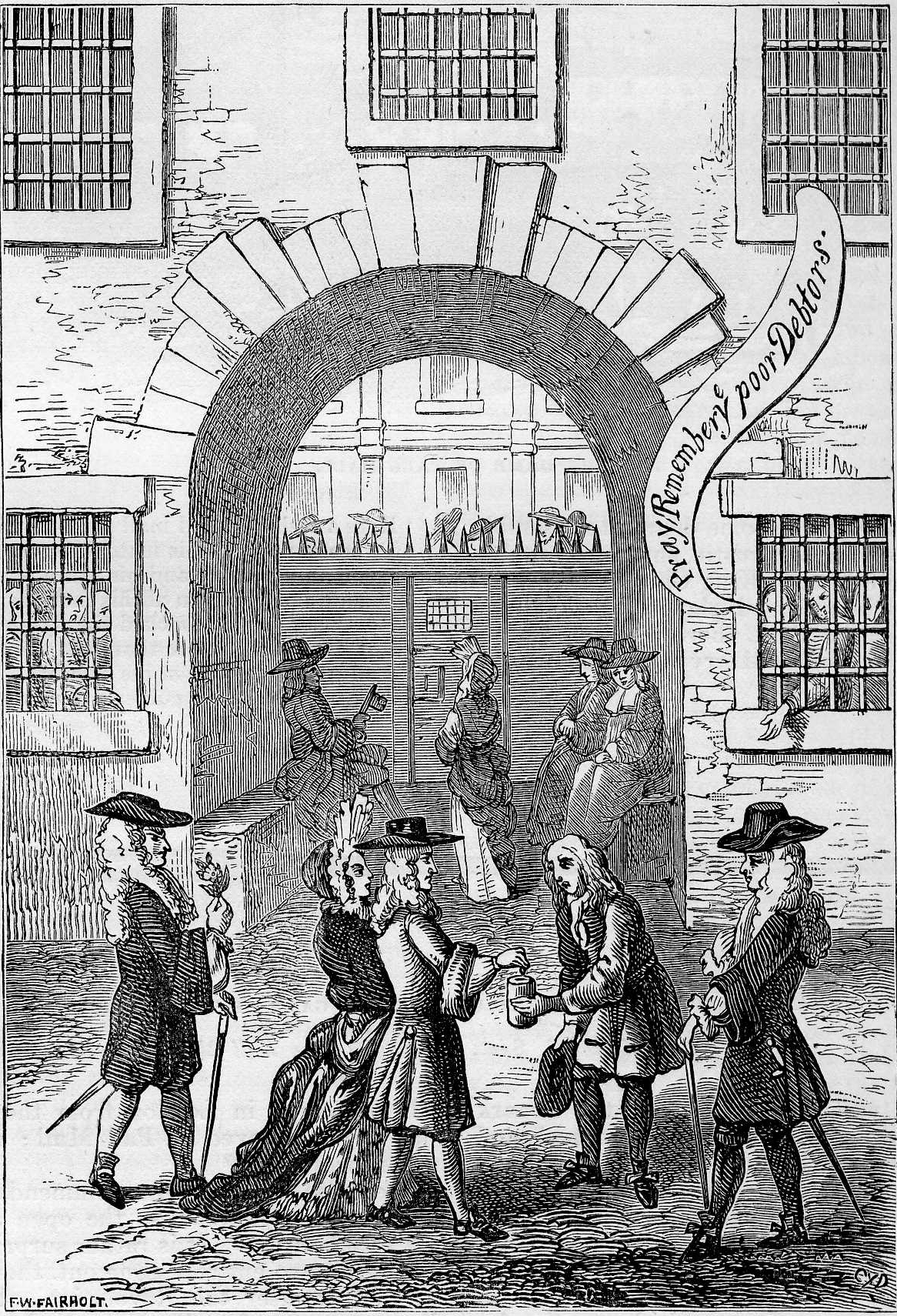
- "Pray remember ye poor debtors": inmates of the Fleet Prison beg passers by for alms

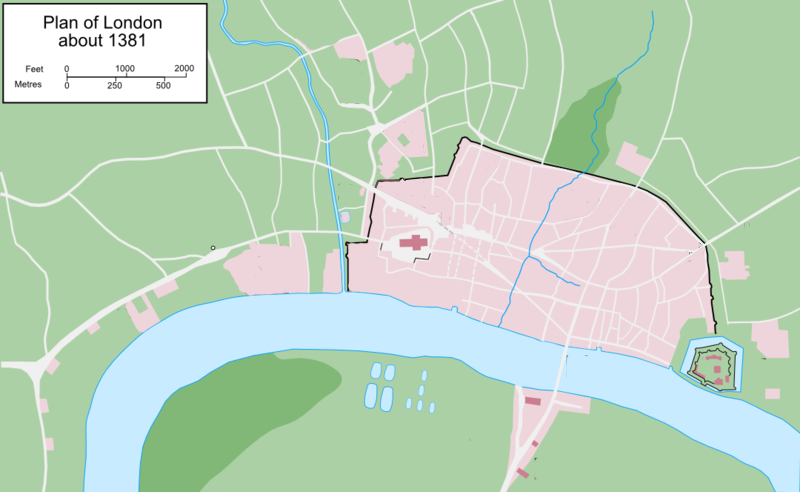
- Location within City of London Location within City of London in 1300
- Location: London; 51°30′58″N 0°6′18″W
- Status: Closed
- Security class: debtor's prison, contemnor's prison
- Population: 300, plus families
- Opened: 1197
- Closed: 1846
- Warden: See below

Notable prisoners
- John Donne, Theodore of Corsica

Fleet Prison was a notorious London prison by the side of the River Fleet. The prison was built in 1197, was rebuilt several times, and was in use until 1844. It was demolished in 1846.

== History ==
The prison was built in 1197 off what is now Farringdon Street, on the eastern bank of the River Fleet after which it was named. It came into particular prominence from being used as a place of reception for persons committed by the Star Chamber, and, afterwards, as a debtor's prison and for persons imprisoned for contempt of court by the Court of Chancery. In 1381, during the Peasants' Revolt, it was deliberately destroyed by Wat Tyler's men.

During the 15th century, inmates were usually imprisoned here for civil rather than criminal cases, and the prison was considered at the time as more comfortable than Ludgate prison. Inmates had to pay for board and lodgings, provide tips for prison servants and pay a fee for when they entered and left the prison. Prison cells ranged from luxurious private rooms to inmates who slept two in a bed. The very poor in prison were even known to beg through a grate while in prison.

In 1666, during the Great Fire of London, it burned down on the third day of the fire, the prisoners fleeing in the last moments. After the fire, the warden of the prison, Sir Jeremy Whichcote, purchased Caron House in Lambeth in order to house the prison's debtors. Whichcote then rebuilt the prison on the original site at his own expense.

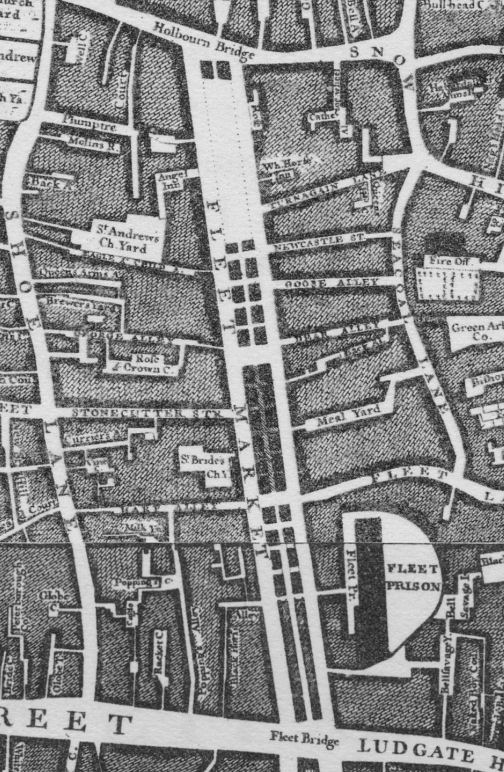
The site of the former Fleet Prison (lower right) on Roque's Map of London 1746

During the 18th century, Fleet Prison was mainly used for debtors and bankrupts. It usually contained about 300 prisoners and their families. Like the Marshalsea prison, it was divided into a restrictive and arduous common side and a more open master's side, where rent had to be paid. At that time, prisons were profit-making enterprises. Prisoners had to pay for food and lodging. There were fees for turning keys and for taking irons off, and Fleet Prison had the highest fees in England. There was even a grille built into the Farringdon Street prison wall, so that prisoners might beg alms from passers-by. But prisoners did not necessarily have to live within Fleet Prison itself; as long as they paid the keeper to compensate him for loss of earnings, they could take lodgings within a particular area outside the prison walls called the "Liberty of the Fleet" or the "Rules of the Fleet". From 1613 on, there were also many clandestine Fleet Marriages. The boundary of the Liberties of the Fleet included the north side of Ludgate Hill, the Old Bailey to Fleet Lane and along it until the Fleet Market, and ran alongside the prison to Ludgate Hill.

Warden of Fleet Prison Act 1728
- Act of Parliament
- Parliament of Great Britain
- Long title: An Act to empower His Majesty, His Heirs and Successors, during the Life of Thomas Bambridge Esquire, to grant the Office of Warden of the Prison of The Fleet to such Person or Persons as His Majesty shall think fit; and to incapacitate the said Thomas Bambridge to enjoy the said Office, or any other whatsoever.
- Citation: 2 Geo. 2. c. 32
- Territorial extent: Great Britain

Dates
- Royal assent: 14 May 1729
- Commencement: 14 June 1729 (Note: Section 1.)
- Repealed: 15 July 1867
Other legislation
Repealed by	Statute Law Revision Act 1867

Status: Repealed

Text of statute as originally enacted

The head of the prison was termed the warden, who was appointed by letters patent. It became a frequent practice of the holder of the patent to farm out the prison to the highest bidder. This custom made the prison long notorious for the cruelties inflicted on prisoners. One purchaser of the office, Thomas Bambridge, who became warden in 1728, was of particularly evil repute. He was guilty of the greatest extortions upon prisoners, and, according to a committee of the House of Commons appointed to inquire into the state of English gaols, arbitrarily and unlawfully loaded with irons, put into dungeons, and destroyed prisoners for debt, treating them in the most barbarous and cruel manner, in high violation and contempt of the laws. He was committed to Newgate Prison, and an act, the Warden of Fleet Prison Act 1728 (2 Geo. 2. c. 32), was passed to prevent his enjoying the office of warden.

During the Gordon Riots in 1780 Fleet Prison was again destroyed and rebuilt in 1781–1782. In 1842, in pursuance of an Act of Parliament, by which inmates of the Marshalsea, Fleet and Queen's Bench prisons were relocated to the Queen's Prison (as the Queen's Bench Prison was renamed), it was finally closed, and in 1844 sold to the Corporation of the City of London, by whom it was pulled down in 1846. The demolition yielded three million bricks, 50 tons of lead and 40,000 square feet (3,700 m^{2}) of paving. After lying empty for 17 years the site was sold to the London, Chatham and Dover Railway and became the site of their new Ludgate station.

== Wardens ==
- Roger de Saperton; fl. 1381
- Elizabeth Venour (c. 1460s)
- Edmund Haslewood (d.1548) of Maidwell
- John Haslewood (d.1550) of Maidwell
- Edward Tyrrell (b 1545)
- Sir Robert Tyrrell (b.1582)
- Thomas Babington of Cuddington
- Sir Jeremy Whichcote (warden 1660–?)
- Sir William Babington
- Thomas Bambridge; fl. 1728

== Notable inmates ==
In 1601, the poet John Donne was imprisoned until it was proven that his wedding to Anne Donne (née More) was legal and valid. The priest who married him (Samuel Brooke) and the man who acted as witness to the wedding were also imprisoned.

Samuel Byrom, son of the writer and poet John Byrom, was imprisoned for debt in 1725. In 1729 he sent a petition to his old school friend, the Duke of Dorset, in which he raged against the injustices of the system:

Holland, the most unpolite Country in the World, uses Debtors with Mildness, and Malefactors with Rigour; England, on the contrary, shews Mercy to Murtherers and Robbers, but of poor Debtors Impossibilities are demanded ... if the Debtor is able to make up his Affairs with the Creditor, how many Hundreds are afterwards kept in Prison for Chamber-Rent, and other unjust Demands of the Gaolers? ... What Barbarity can be greater, than for Gaolers (without any Provocation) to load Prisoners with Irons, and thrust them into Dungeons, and manacle them, and deny their Friends to visit them, and force them to pay excessive Prices for their Chamber-Rent, their Victuals and Drink; to open their Letters and seize the Charity that is sent them; and, in short, by oppressing them by all the Ways that the worst of Tyrants can invent? Such Cruelty reduces the Prisoners to Despair, insomuch, that many choose rather to shoot, hang or throw themselves out of the Window, than to be insulted, beaten and imposed upon by the Gaolers ... if every Gaoler was allowed a yearly Sallary ... and no Gaoler suffered, under the severest of Penalties, to take either Bribe, Fee, or Reward, no Demand for Chamber-Rent, nor any Fees for Entrance or going out of Prison; in such a Case the Gaols would not swarm as they now do ... In foreign Countries, where the Romish Religion prevails, what Crowds of People of both Sexes, from the highest Prince to the meanest Peasant, thrust themselves into Religious Houses ... it is an apparent Injury to the Country ... too obvious to be denied, that the many Prisons in England, where so many Thousands of both Sexes are detained, is a greater Loss and Injury to the King and Country ...

Other notable inmates include:

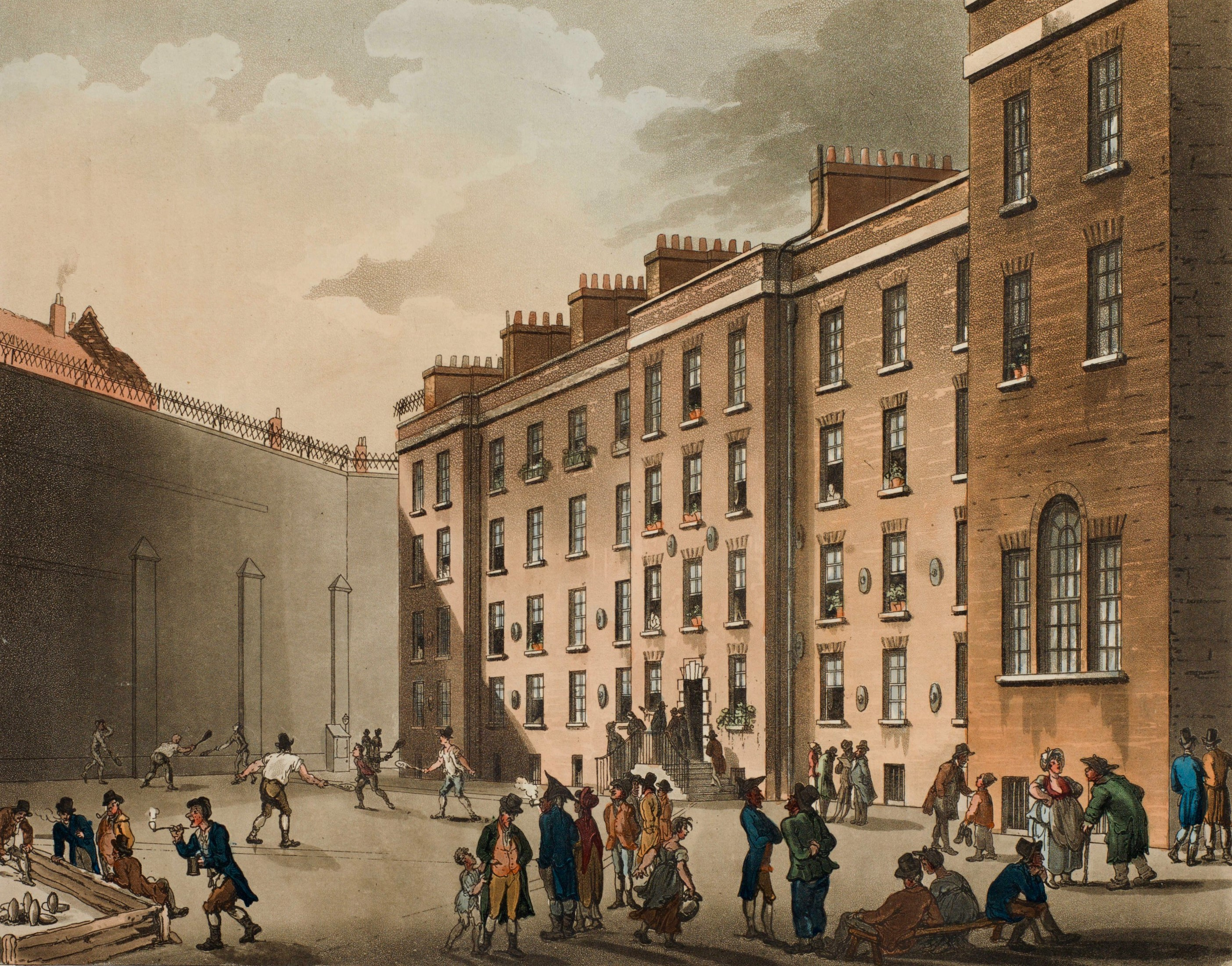
The Racquet Ground of the Fleet Prison circa 1808

- Christopher Billopp – Commander in the King's Navy and landowner on Staten Island, New York died in Fleet Prison, 1725.
- John Cleland – 18th century fighter for the freedom of speech in Great Britain
- Edmund Dummer (1651–1713) – Surveyor of the Navy, founder of the Royal Navy docks at Devonport, Plymouth, Member of Parliament for Arundel and founder of the first packet service between Falmouth, Cornwall and the West Indies, died a bankrupt in Fleet debtors' prison.
- Sir Richard Grosvenor, 1st Baronet (founder to the lineage of the Dukes of Westminster) – spent almost 10 years in the prison after his brother-in-law, Peter Daniell, defaulted on his debts in 1629. Grosvenor was imprisoned because he had stood surety to Daniell.
- Charles Hall – a notable economic thinker, and early socialist.
- John Jones of Gellilyfdy – a Welsh antiquary and calligrapher who, repeatedly imprisoned between 1617 and the 1650s, used his time in prison to carry out work copying manuscripts.
- Jørgen Jørgensen – a Danish adventurer who helped build the first settlement in Tasmania and for a short time in 1809 ruled over Iceland, after which he became a British spy and was later deported to Tasmania.
- Richard Hogarth – father of the painter and printmaker William Hogarth and a poor Latin school teacher and operator of an unsuccessful coffee house for Latin-speakers, was imprisoned for debt in Fleet Prison for five years.
- Sir Thomas Lodge – spent a short time in the Fleet after declaring himself bankrupt at the end of his term as Lord Mayor of London in 1563.
- Richard Onslow – spent a short time in the Fleet after being expelled from the Inner Temple for taking part in an affray in 1556. He was later reinstated after an apology and ultimately rose to Solicitor General for England and Wales and Speaker of the House of Commons.
- William Paget (actor) – author of "The Humour of the Fleet", 1749
- John Paston – 15th century gentleman and landowner, known for the Paston Letters, spent three separate occasions in this prison.
- William Penn – early champion of democracy and religious freedom, was imprisoned for debt in 1707.
- Moses Pitt – publisher who, in 1691, published The Cry of the Oppressed, a moving appeal on behalf of himself and all prisoners for debt across the nation.
- Elizabeth Thomas (1675 – 1731), satirised as "Curll's Corinna" in Pope's Dunciad, was believed to have collaborated with Curll on Codrus, or, 'The Dunciad' Dissected (1728) while in prison for debt.
- George Thomson (physician) (c. 1619 – 1676) – physician and medical writer, fought for the royalists under Prince Maurice during the English Civil War. He was captured by the parliamentary forces at Newbury in 1644, and imprisoned for a time here.
- Francis Tregian the Younger – reputed to have used his time in prison to carry out work copying musical manuscripts.
- Theodore von Neuhoff – the only King of Corsica, in 1756, just before his death.
- Thomas Keyes or Keys (by 1524 – before 5 September 1571) – captain of Sandgate Castle, and serjeant porter to Queen Elizabeth I. Without the Queen's consent, he married Lady Mary Grey, who had a claim to the throne.
- Cagliostro (1743 – 1793), an Italian charlatan who was involved in the Affair of the Diamond Necklace.

=== In fiction ===
- Mr. Samuel Pickwick – protagonist of Charles Dickens's The Pickwick Papers, who is imprisoned in the Fleet for refusing to pay fines stemming from a breach of promise suit brought against him by Mrs. Bardell. The book contains a vivid description of the life, customs and abuses of the prison.
- At the close of Shakespeare's play, Henry IV, Part 2 (Act V, Scene V), Falstaff is surprised when, instead of being promoted by the new king, the Chief Justice tells his officers to "Go, carry Sir John Falstaff to the Fleet; /Take all his company along with him."
- In The Luck of Barry Lyndon, Lyndon spends the last nineteen years of his life in Fleet Prison.
- Near the end of Pierce Egan's 1821 story Life in London, Bob Logic spends time in Fleet Prison for debt.
- At the end of The Adventures of Peregrine Pickle by Tobias Smollett, Peregrine and some of his friends go to Fleet Prison for bankruptcy after Mr. Pickle loans all of his money and loses his pension in Chapter CVI.
- Walter Besant and James Rice's novel The Chaplain of the Fleet (1881) is an historical novel which takes place in the Fleet Prison during the eighteenth century.

== See also ==
- List of demolished buildings and structures in London

== Bibliography ==
- The London Encyclopaedia, Ben Weinreb & Christopher Hibbert, Macmillan, 1995, ISBN 0-333-57688-8
