= Himsi =

Himsi (Arabic: حِمْصي / ALA-LC: Ḥimṣī) or Homsi (Levantine Arabic: حُمْصي / Ḥomṣi) is an Arabic locational surname (nisba), meaning a person originally from Homs, Syria. This surname is most commonly found in Syria as well as Lebanon. Notable people with the surname include:

- Akram al-Homsi, Jordanian politician
- Edmond Al-Homsi (1901–1972), Syrian politician
- Ibn Na'ima al-Himsi (9th century), Syrian translator
- Majd Homsi (born 1982), Syrian footballer
- Qustaki al-Himsi (1858–1941), Syrian writer
