= Square One (game show) =

British television series

Square One is a quiz programme that was produced by Granada Television and aired on the ITV network from 1980 until 1984. It was originally hosted by Nick Turnbull for the first series with comedian Joe Brown replacing him until it ended in 1984.

== Concept ==
Square One was played in five rounds, each featuring certain questions or tasks which allowed the participant to progress on the 44-square board. This was followed by a playoff consisting of 1 minute of rapid questions until the final square was reached or time would run out. The participant ending the game the furthest away would win £250 for the charity of their choice; each week the jackpot would increase by £250 if it wasn't won.

== Transmission guide ==
Series	Start date	End date	Episodes
1	2 April 1980	26 June 1980	13
2	13 May 1981	17 June 1981	6
3	8 January 1982	2 April 1982	13
