= Sir Jeremy Whichcote, 1st Baronet =

English barrister

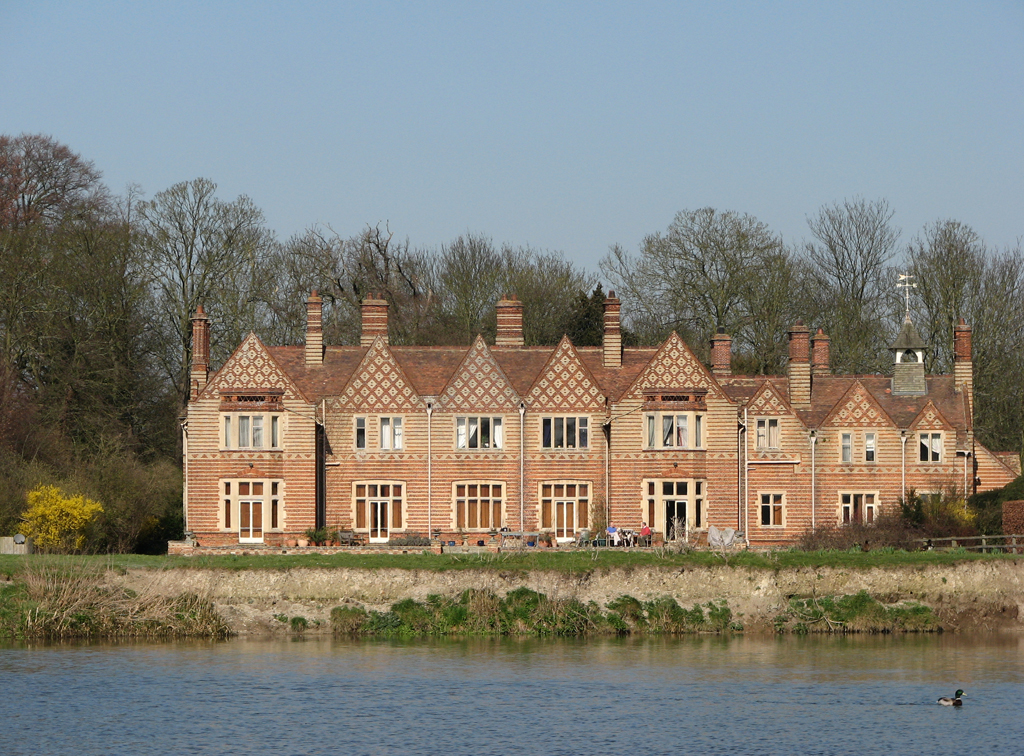
Quy Hall, Cambridgeshire

Sir Jeremy Whichcote, 1st Baronet (c. 1614–1677), was an English barrister and Solicitor-General to the Frederick V of the Palatinate. He was the owner of the manor of Totteridge in north London.

== Early life and education ==
Jeremy Whichcote was born around 1614. He was a barrister-at-law and Solicitor-General to the Elector Palatine, His wife Anne (died August 1714) was the eldest daughter and heir of Joseph Grave. He was brother to Benjamin Whichcote and Elizabeth Foxcroft and the uncle of Ezechiel Foxcroft.

Whichcote bought the post of Warden of Fleet Prison and, during the Commonwealth, was able to shelter the king's friends and agents in this way. He was created a baronet on 2 April 1660 to reward him for his services to the exiled King Charles II.)

== Hendon and Totteridge ==
Whichcote was resident at Hendon House, in the grounds of which Hendon School now stands, until his death in 1677.

He was the owner of the manor of Totteridge in north London.

== Death ==
Whichcote died in July 1677 and is buried at St Mary's Church, Hendon. His son Paul became the second baronet.

Baronetage of England
New creation	Baronet (of the Inner Temple); 1660 – 1677	Succeeded by Paul Whichcote
