= John Smith (Platonist) =

English philosopher, theologian, and educator

John Smith (1618, Achurch, Northamptonshire – 7 August 1652, Cambridge) was an English philosopher, theologian, and educator.

== Life ==
Smith, educated at Oundle School, entered Emmanuel College, Cambridge, in 1636, took his B.A. in 1640 and his M.A. in 1644, at which time he was chosen fellow of Queens' College. His health seems to have been precarious from the first. His labours were principally confined to his office as teacher, for which he had remarkable qualifications. His preaching was with a rare degree of eloquence, which can still be felt in the Select Discourses (1660). In that work, he writes about several metaphysical and epistemological issues surrounding Christianity — the existence of God, eternal life and rationality. He gained much local fame as a lecturer on mathematics. His personal character was such as to excite the admiration of his associates to a remarkable degree. As a "founder" of the Cambridge Platonists, his special service was in developing a Christian philosophy that was deeply rational and open to the new science yet directed to the practical goal of living a religious life. To these ends, Smith drew heavily from Plotinus.
