= Cambridge Platonists =

Group of academics

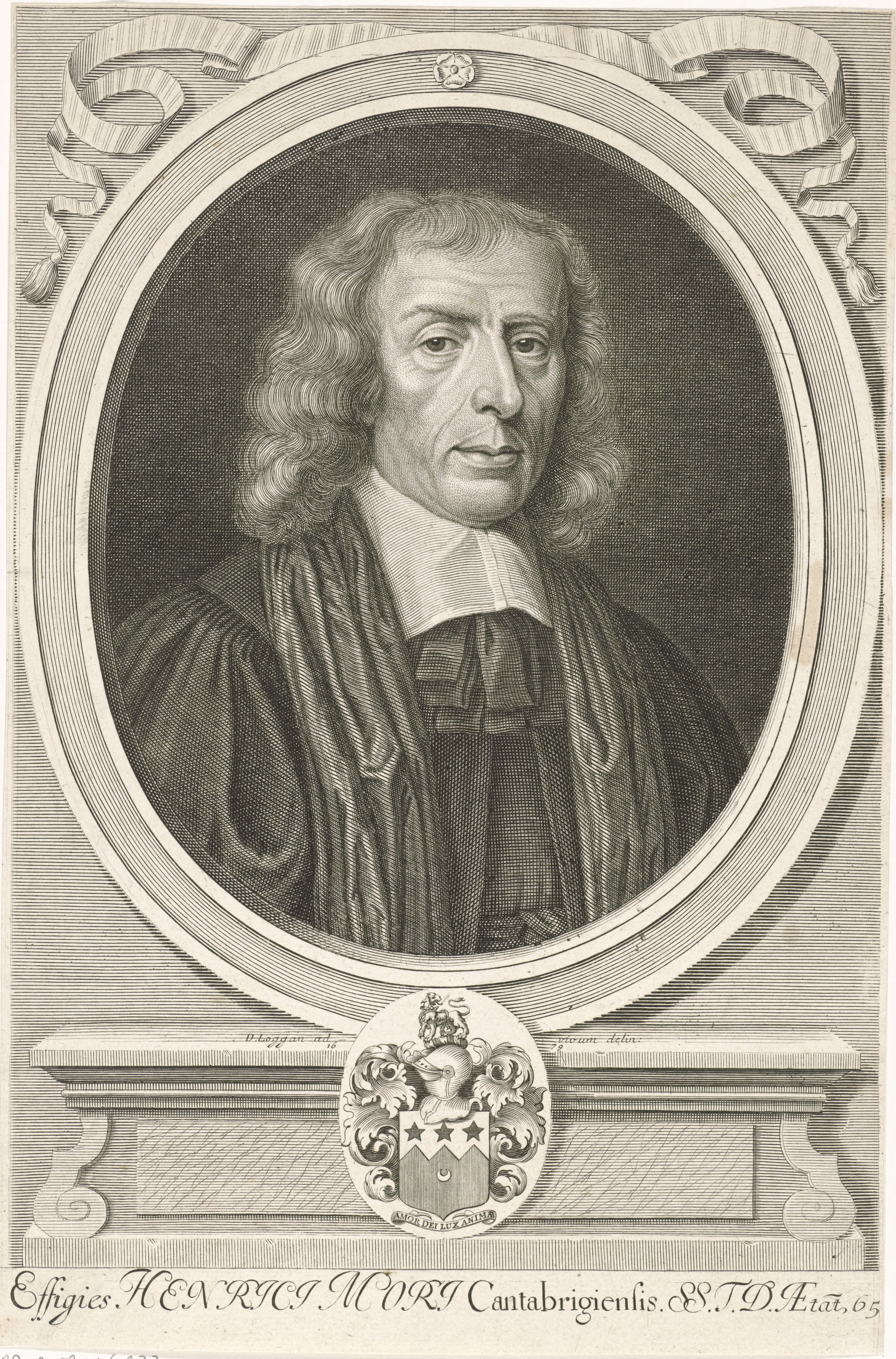
Henry More of the Cambridge Platonist school

The Cambridge Platonists were an influential group of Platonist philosophers and Christian theologians at the University of Cambridge during the 17th century. The leading figures were Ralph Cudworth and Henry More.

== Group and its name ==
Mark Goldie, writing in the Oxford Dictionary of National Biography, notes that the term "Cambridge Platonists" was given in the 19th century and can be misleading. There is no clear distinction between the group and latitudinarians in general.

=== Historiography ===
The categorization and interpretation of the Cambridge Platonists has changed over time. Frances Yates interpreted them as scholars who engaged with the Christian Kabbalah but rejected Hermeticism following Isaac Casaubon's redating of the Hermetic corpus. She argues that Cudworth and More perpetuate certain Renaissance Neoplatonic ideas, including a broad syncretism of early forms of Hermeticism, in a new scholarly context.

Dmitri Levitin has challenged any categorization of the Cambridge Platonists as a cohesive philosophical group. While he admits that the group "existed as a loose set of acquaintances linked by tutorial relationships," he argues that they were not exclusive in their interest in Platonism, nor did most of them believe in any syncretism nor in a prisca theologia/philosophia perennis. Levitin notes that of the Cambridge Platonists, only More saw himself as a philosopher rather than a philologist or theologian and he faced criticism from others, including Cudworth, for his lack of attention to historical detail. Moreover, philosophers not traditionally deemed "Cambridge Platonists" took an historical and philosophical interest in Platonism and ideas of ancient science. Based on these conclusions Levitin rejects any categorization of the Cambridge Platonists as a cohesive group in terms of philosophical views as historically unfounded.

More recently, David Leech has argued that while Levitin makes some important points "it would be a mistake to assume that the category of Cambridge Platonism is a retroprojection of nineteenth century historiography. This is because earlier practices of referring to a group of primarily Cambridge-based 'Platonists', invariably including Ralph Cudworth (1617–1688) and Henry More (1614–1687), usually Benjamin Whichcote (1609–1683), and (more variably) a number of other key figures, can be traced back at least to the 1730s in continental Europe, and still earlier in English texts."

== Views ==
The Cambridge Platonists used the framework of the philosophia perennis of Agostino Steuco, and from it argued for moderation. They believed that reason is the proper judge of disagreements, and so they advocated dialogue between the Puritan and Laudian traditions. The orthodox English Calvinists of the time found in their views an insidious attack, by-passing as it did the basic theological issues of atonement and justification by faith. Given the circle's Cambridge background in Puritan colleges such as Sidney Sussex College, Cambridge and Emmanuel College, Cambridge, the undermining was intellectually all the more effective. John Bunyan complained in those terms about Edward Fowler, a close latitudinarian follower.

Their understanding of reason was as "the candle of the Lord", an echo of the divine within the human soul and an imprint of God within man. They believed that reason could judge the private revelations of Puritan narrative, and investigate contested rituals and liturgy of the Church of England. For this approach they were called "latitudinarian".

The dogmatism of the Puritan divines, with their anti-rationalist demands, was, they felt, incorrect. They also felt that the Calvinist insistence on individual revelation left God uninvolved with the majority of mankind. At the same time, they were reacting against the reductive materialist writings of Thomas Hobbes. They felt that the latter, while rationalist, were denying the idealistic part of the universe.

To the Cambridge Platonists, religion and reason were in harmony, and reality was known not by physical sensation alone, but by intuition of the intelligible forms that exist behind the material world of everyday perception. Universal, ideal forms inform matter, and the physical senses are unreliable guides to their reality. In response to the mechanical philosophy, More proposed a "Hylarchic Principle", and Cudworth a concept of "Plastic Nature".

== Representatives ==
- Benjamin Whichcote (1609–1683)
- Peter Sterry (1613–1672)
- George Rust (d.1670)
- Henry More (1614–1687)
- Ralph Cudworth (1617–1688)
- John Smith (1618–1652)
- John Worthington (1618–1671)
- Nathaniel Culverwel (1619–1651)
- Anne Conway, Viscountess Conway (1631–1679)
- Joseph Glanvill (1636–1680)
- Damaris Cudworth Masham (1659–1708)
- John Norris (1657–1711)

Though coming later and not generally considered a Cambridge Platonist himself, Anthony Ashley Cooper, 3rd Earl of Shaftesbury (1671–1713) was much influenced by the movement.

== Major works ==
- Benjamin Whichcote (1609–1683) was one of the leaders of the movement; while he did not publish in his lifetime, he was an active pastor and academic. His sermons were notable and caused controversies, and he wrote a great deal even without publishing. In 1685, Some Select Notions of B. Whichcote was published due to demand. After that was Select Sermons (1689) (with a preface by Shaftesbury) and Several Discourses (1701). Finally, a collection of his sayings appeared as Moral and Religious Aphorisms (1703).
- Peter Sterry is remembered for his A Discourse of the Freedom of the Will (1675), among other works.
- Henry More (1614–1687) wrote many works. As a Platonist, his important works were the Manual of Ethics (1666), the Divine Dialogues (1668), and the Manual of Metaphysics (1671). While all of More's works enjoyed popularity, his Divine Dialogues were perhaps most influential.
- Ralph Cudworth's chief philosophical work was The True Intellectual System of the Universe (1678). His Treatise concerning Eternal and Immutable Morality appeared posthumously in 1731.
- John Smith, a student of Benjamin Whichcote, is best remembered for the elegance of his style and the depth of his learning in the posthumously published Select Discourses (1660). Smith draws extensively from Plotinus to support his Christian Platonism.
- Nathaniel Culverwel's chief work was Light of Nature (1652). Culverwell died young (probably at the age of 32). He had intended to write a multi-part work reconciling the Gospel with philosophical reason.

== See also ==
- Allegorical interpretations of Plato
- List of Renaissance commentators on Aristotle
- Platonic Academy (Florence)
- Platonism in the Renaissance
