= Benjamin Whichcote =

Anglican bishop (1609–1683)

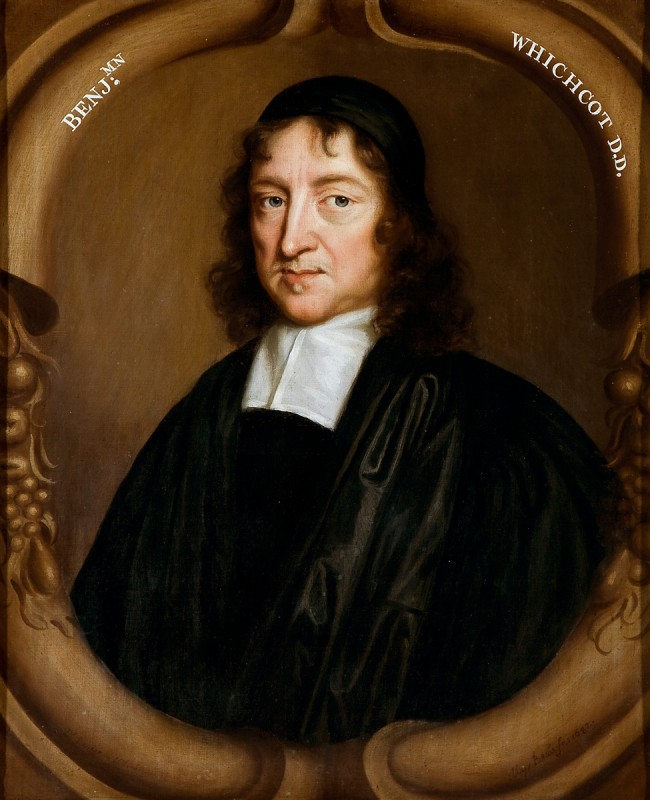
Benjamin Whichcote, portrait by Mary Beale

Benjamin Whichcote (March 1609 – May 1683) was an English Establishment and Puritan priest, Provost of King's College, Cambridge and leader of the Cambridge Platonists. He held that man is the "child of reason" and so not completely depraved by nature, as Puritans held. He also argued for religious toleration.

== Life and career ==
Whichcote was born at Whichcote Hall in Stoke upon Tern, Shropshire. He entered Emmanuel College, Cambridge in 1628, and became a fellow in 1633. In 1637, he was ordained a deacon and priest at the same time. In 1643, he married and took up priestly duties in a Cambridge-dispensed parish in North Cadbury, Somerset. In 1644, he became 19th Provost of King's College due to Parliamentary control of the universities. However, he was the only new head of house who did not subscribe to the National Covenant. In 1650, during the Interregnum, he was vice-chancellor of the University of Cambridge, and advised Oliver Cromwell on the subject of toleration of the Jews. After the Restoration he was removed from his position at King's College, but reinstated when he accepted the Act of Uniformity in 1662.

From that time he was the Curate of St. Anne's Church, Blackfriars, until it burnt down in 1666. In 1668, he was appointed Vicar of St Lawrence Jewry. He was a brother to Jeremy Whichcote and Elizabeth Foxcroft, wife of Ezechiel Foxcroft.

Whichcote was one of the leaders of the Cambridge Platonists, and had liberal views. In 1650, he was involved in a controversy with his former teacher and friend Anthony Tuckney. He was opposed to the doctrine of total depravity and adopted a semi-Pelagian position, holding that man is the "child of reason", and therefore not, as the Puritans held, of a completely depraved nature. He argued that there are some questions beyond the ability of reasonable and religious people to solve, and he therefore called for religious toleration. He was accused at various times by various persons of being an Arminian, Socinian, and Latitudinarian.

He died in Cambridge in May 1683 aged 74 and was buried in London at the church of St Lawrence Jewry.

== Works ==
Nearly all of his works were published posthumously. They include Select Notions of B. Whichcote (1685), Select Sermons (1689), Discourses (1701), and Moral and Religious Aphorisms (1703).

Academic offices
Preceded by Samuel Collins	Provost of King's College, Cambridge; 1644-1660	Succeeded by James Fleetwood
