= Gurkha =

Indian and Nepalese national soldiers

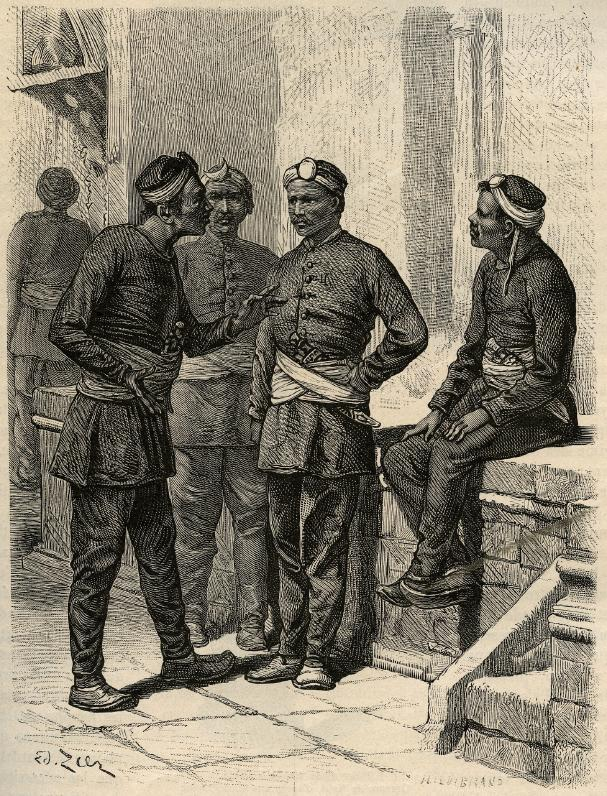
Nepali soldiers; drawing by Gustave Le Bon, 1885

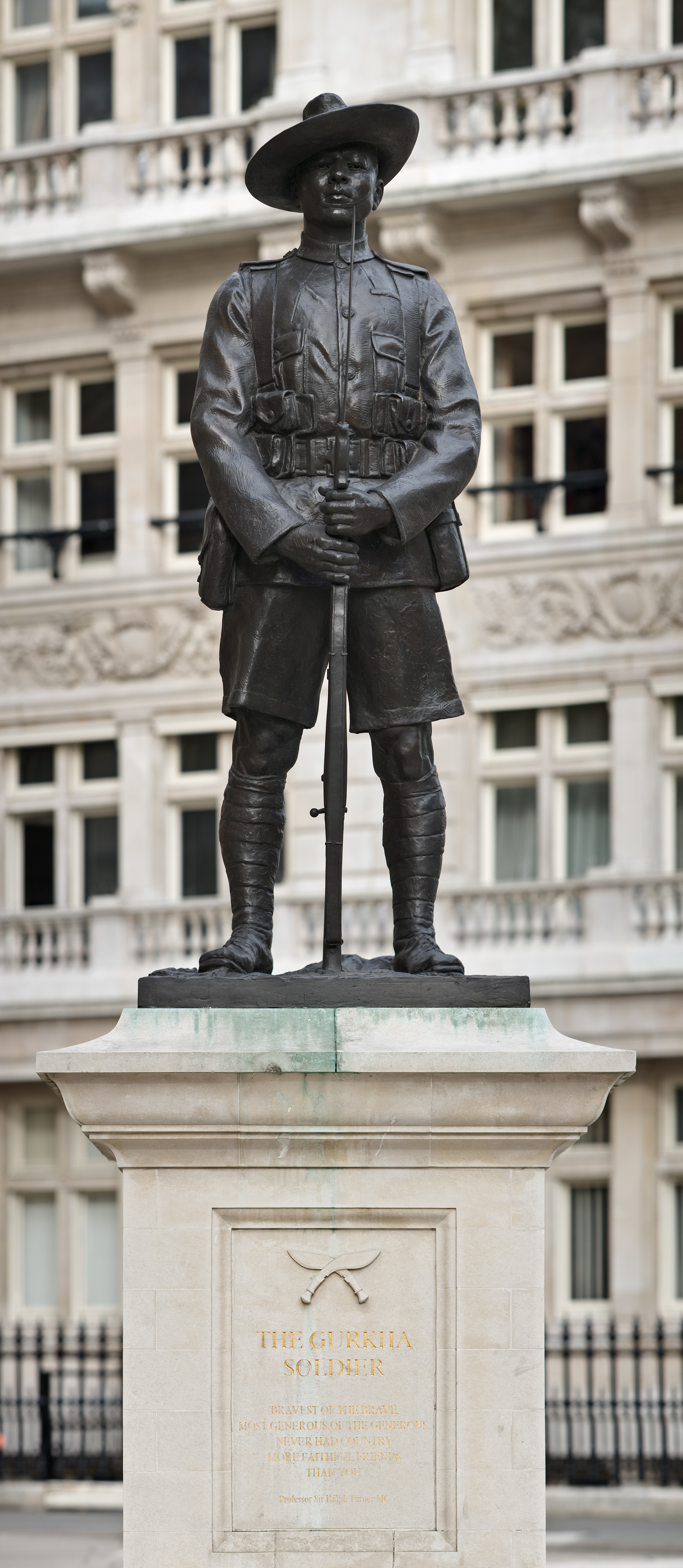
Monument to the Gurkha Soldier in Horse Guards Avenue, outside the Ministry of Defence, City of Westminster, London

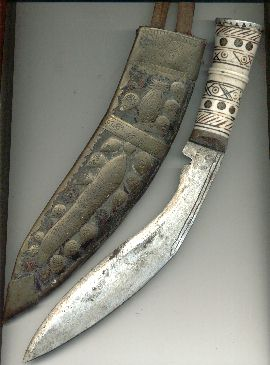
A khukuri, the signature weapon of the Gurkhas

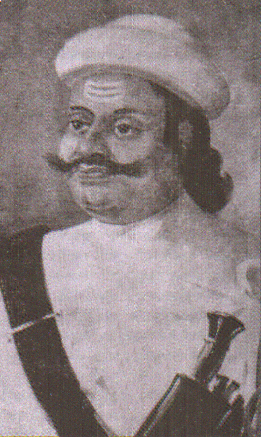
Kaji (equivalent to Prime Minister of Gorkha Kingdom) Vamshidhar "Kalu" Pande and Chief of the Gorkhali Army; one of the most highly decorated Gorkhali commanders

The Gurkhas or Gorkhas (/ˈɡɜːrkə, ˈɡʊər-/), with the endonym Gorkhali (Nepali: गोर्खाली [ɡoɾkʰaːliː]), are soldiers native to South Asia, chiefly residing within Nepal and some parts of North India.

The Gurkha units consist of Nepali and (in India) Indian Gorkha, Nepali-speaking Indian people. They are recruited for the Nepali Army (96,000), the Indian Army (42,000), the British Army (4,010), the Gurkha Contingent of the Singapore Police Force, the Gurkha Reserve Unit of the Royal Brunei Armed Forces, and United Nations peacekeeping forces in war zones around the world. They first provided service to the British Crown in 1815 following the Anglo-Nepali War, and have served in British and Commonwealth forces ever since. Ordinary citizens of the two demographic groups become a Gurkha by applying for, and passing, the selection and training process.

Gurkhas have a reputation for fearless military prowess. Indian Army Field Marshal Sam Manekshaw said "If a man says he is not afraid of dying, he is either lying or he is a Gurkha." Gurkhas are closely associated with the khukuri, a forward-curving knife.

== Origins ==
Historically, the terms "Gurkha" and "Gorkhali" were synonymous with "Nepali", which originates from the hill principality Gorkha Kingdom, from which the Kingdom of Nepal expanded under Prithvi Narayan Shah, who was the last ruler of the Gorkha Kingdom and first monarch of the Kingdom of Nepal. In fact, the Gorkhas' impressive conquests of the Kathmandu Valley supplied the British with an exaggerated view of Nepal’s strength, ultimately helping lead to the Anglo-Nepalese War (1814–1816). The name may be traced to the medieval Hindu warrior-saint Guru Gorakhnath who has a historic shrine in Gorkha District. The word itself derived from Go-Raksha (Nepali: गोरक्षा i.e., 'Protector (रक्षा) of cows (गो')), raksha becoming rakha (रखा). Rakhawala means 'protector' and is derived from raksha as well.

There are Gurkha military units in the Nepalese, British and Indian armies enlisted in Nepal, United Kingdom, India and Singapore. Although they meet many of the criteria of Article 47 of Protocol I of the Geneva Conventions regarding mercenaries, they are exempt under clauses 47(e) and (f), similarly to the French Foreign Legion.

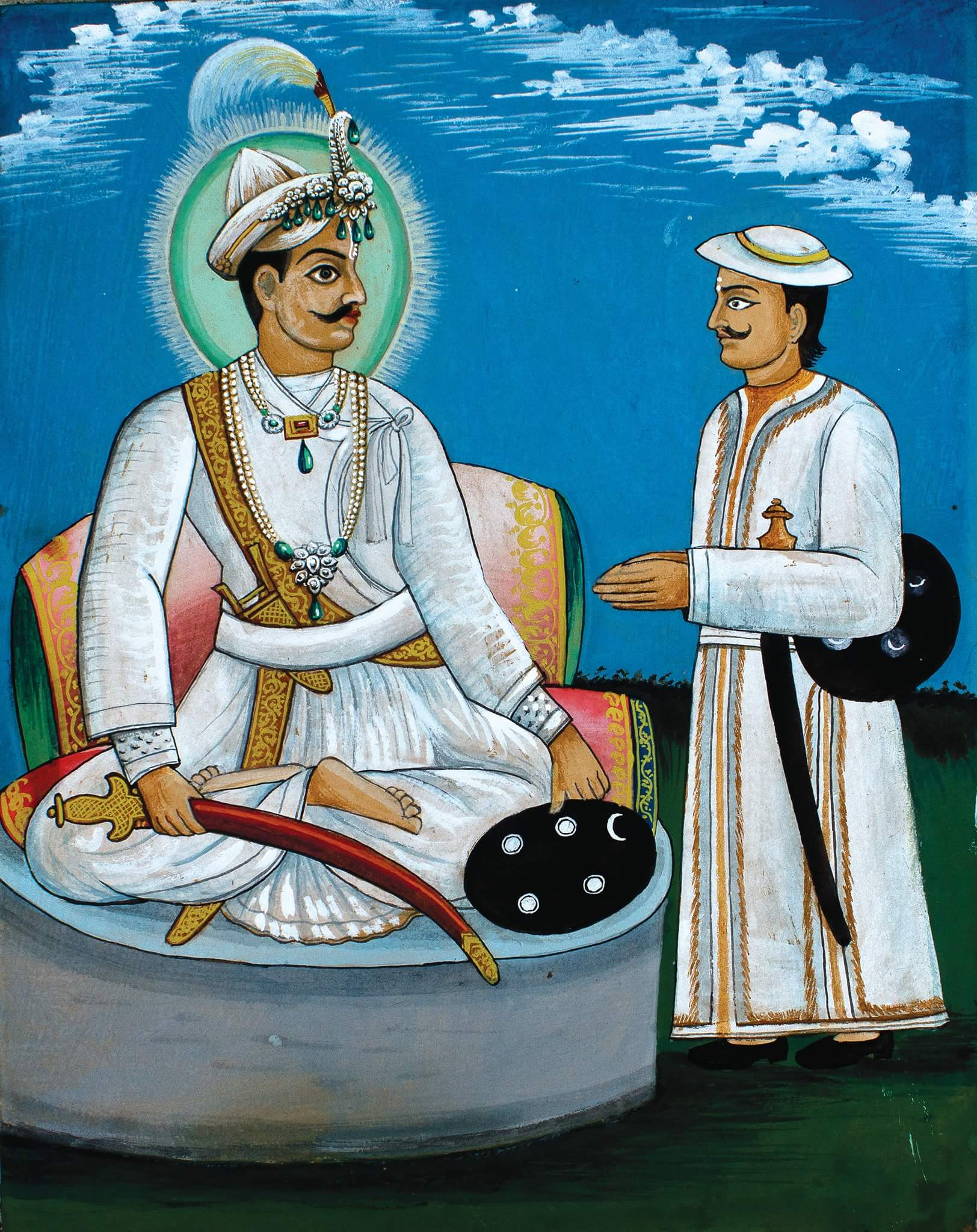
King of Gorkha Kingdom and founder of modern Gorkhali Force Maharajadhiraja Prithvi Narayan Shah, (1743–1775) consulting with his first Army Chief Senapati Shivaram Singh Basnyat (d. 1747)

During the 1814–16 Anglo-Nepalese War between the Kingdom of Nepal and the East India Company, the Gorkhali soldiers impressed the British, who called them Gurkhas.

== British East India Company army ==
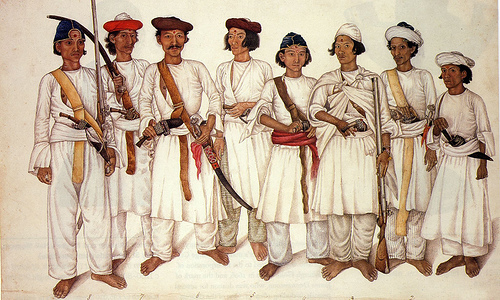
Gurkha soldiers during the Anglo-Nepalese War, 1815

The Anglo-Nepalese War was fought between the Gurkha Kingdom of Nepal and the British East India Company as a result of border disputes and ambitious expansionism of both belligerents. The war ended with the signing of the Treaty of Sugauli in 1816.

David Ochterlony and British political agent William Fraser were among the first to recognize the potential of Gurkha soldiers. During the war the British used defectors from the Gurkha army and employed them as irregular forces. Fraser's confidence in their loyalty was such that in April 1815 he proposed forming them into a battalion under Lt. Ross called the Nasiri Regiment. This regiment, which later became the 1st King George's Own Gurkha Rifles, saw action at Malaun Fort under the leadership of Lt. Lawtie, who reported to Ochterlony that he "had the greatest reason to be satisfied with their exertions".

About 5,000 men entered British service in 1815. These groups, eventually lumped together under the term Gurkha, became the backbone of British Indian forces.

As well as Ochterlony's Gurkha battalions, Fraser and Lt. Frederick Young raised the Sirmoor Battalion, later to become the 2nd King Edward VII's Own Gurkha Rifles. An additional battalion—the Kumaon—was also raised, eventually becoming the 3rd Queen Alexandra's Own Gurkha Rifles. None of these units fought in the second campaign.

Gurkhas served as troops under contract to the British East India Company in the Pindaree War of 1817, in Bharatpur in 1826, and the First and Second Anglo-Sikh Wars in 1846 and 1848.

During the Indian Rebellion of 1857, Gurkhas fought on the British side and became part of the British Indian Army on its formation. The 8th (Sirmoor) Local Battalion made a notable contribution during the conflict, and 25 Indian Order of Merit awards were made to men from that regiment during the Siege of Delhi.

Three days after the rebellion began, the Sirmoor Battalion was ordered to move to Meerut, where the British garrison was barely holding on, and in doing so they had to march up to 48 kilometres a day. Later, during the four-month Siege of Delhi, they defended Hindu Rao's house, losing 327 of 490 men. During this action they fought side by side with the 60th Rifles and a strong bond developed.

Twelve regiments from the Nepalese Army also took part in the relief of Lucknow under the command of Shri Teen (3) Maharaja Jung Bahadur Rana of Nepal and his older brother C-in-C Ranodip Singh Kunwar (Ranaudip Singh Bahadur Rana) (later to succeed Jung Bahadur and become Sri Teen Maharaja Ranodip Singh of Nepal).

After the rebellion the 60th Rifles pressed for the Sirmoor Battalion to become a rifle regiment. This honour was granted in 1858 when the battalion was renamed the Sirmoor Rifle Regiment and awarded a third colour. In 1863, Queen Victoria presented the regiment with the Queen's Truncheon, as a replacement for the colours that rifle regiments do not usually have.

== British Indian Army (c. 1857–1947) ==
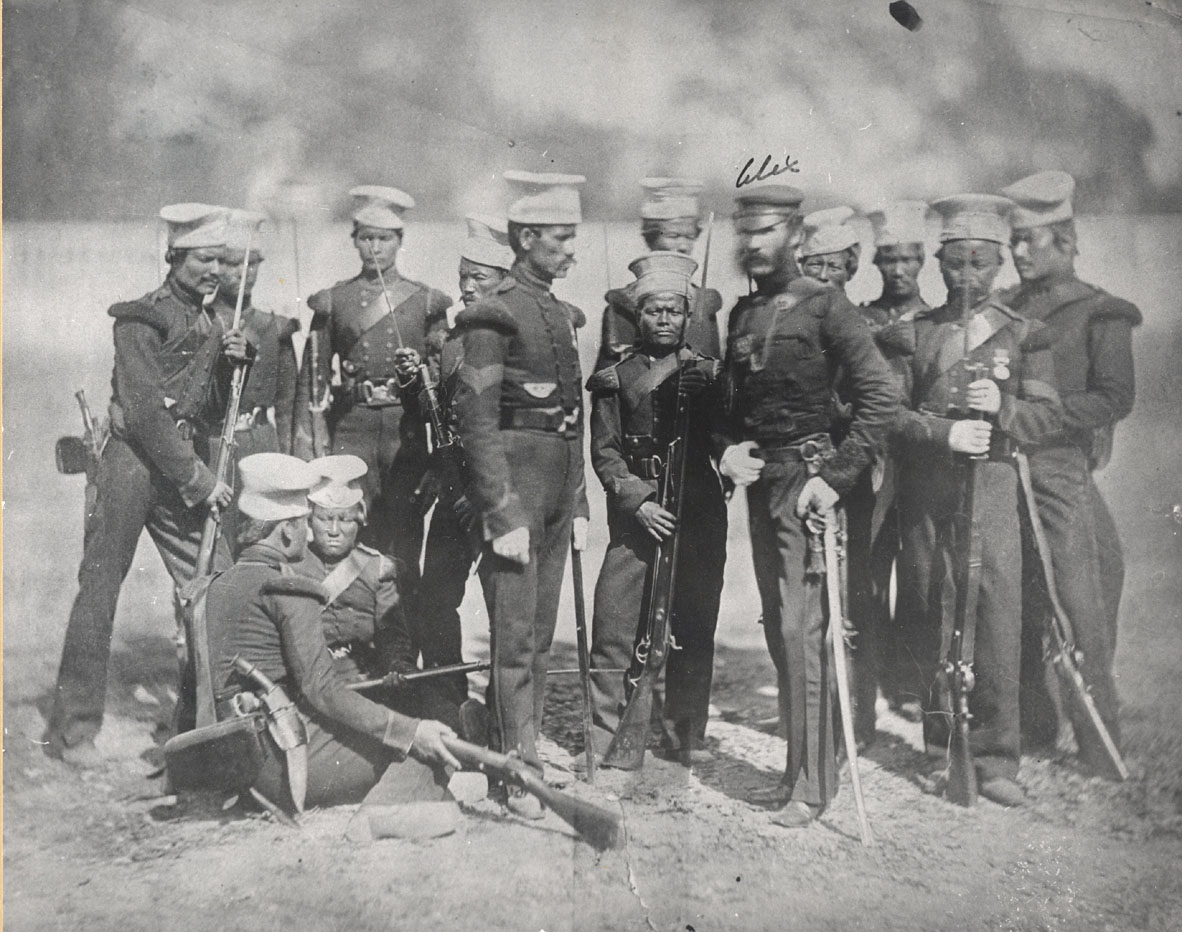
The Nusseree Battalion, later known as the 1st Gurkha Rifles, c. 1857

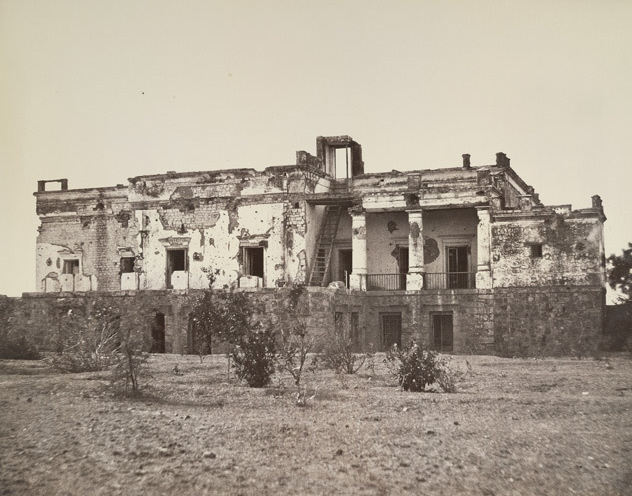
Hindu Rao's house shortly after the siege

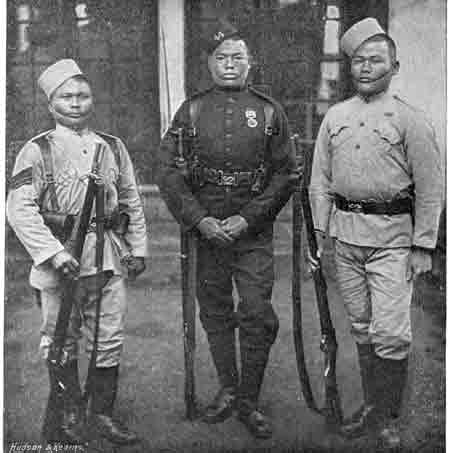
Gurkha soldiers (1896). The centre figure wears the dark green dress uniform worn by all Gurkhas in British service, with certain regimental distinctions.

From the end of the Indian Rebellion of 1857 until the start of World War I, the Gurkha Regiments saw active service in Burma, Afghanistan, Northeast India and the North-West Frontier of India, Malta (the Russo-Turkish War, 1877–78), Cyprus, Malaya, China (the Boxer Rebellion of 1900) and Tibet (Younghusband's Expedition of 1905).

After the Indian Rebellion of 1857, the British authorities in India feared the inclusion of Hindu castes in the army. They discouraged Brahminical influence in the military and considered the Hindu castes more susceptible to Brahminical values. As a result, they discouraged the inclusion of Thakuri and Khas groups in the Gorkha units and refused to recruit tribes other than Gurungs and Magars for Gorkha units. They also exerted diplomatic pressure on Prime Minister Bir Shamsher Jang Bahadur Rana to ensure that at least 75% of new recruits were Gurungs and Magars.

Between 1901 and 1906, the Gurkha regiments were renumbered from the 1st to the 10th and re-designated as the Gurkha Rifles. In this time the Brigade of Gurkhas, as the regiments came to be collectively known, was expanded to 20 battalions in the ten regiments.

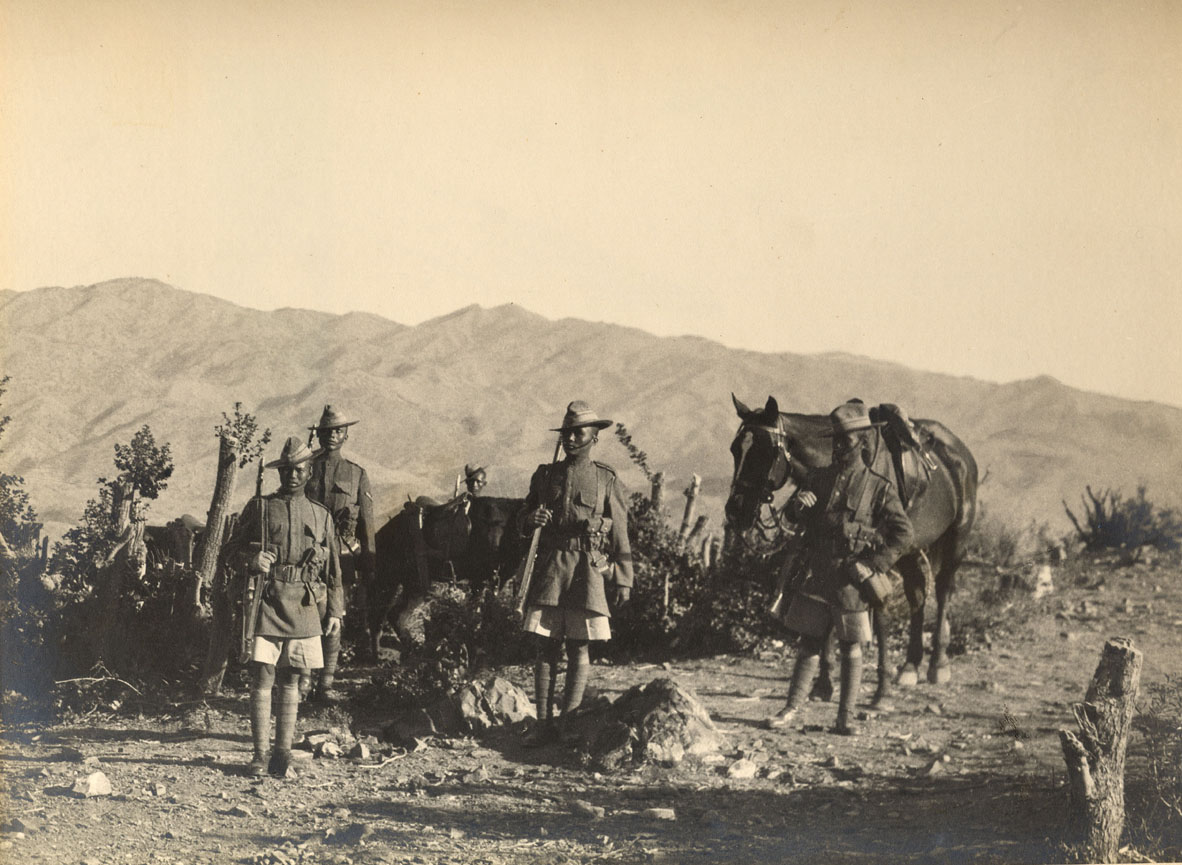
2nd/5th Royal Gurkha Rifles, North-West Frontier 1923

During World War I (1914–1918) more than 200,000 Gurkhas served in the British Army, suffering approximately 20,000 casualties and receiving almost 2,000 gallantry awards. The number of Gurkha battalions was increased to 33, and Gurkha units were placed at the disposal of the British high command by the Gurkha government for service on all fronts. Many Gurkha volunteers served in non-combatant roles, serving in units such as the Army Bearer Corps and the labour battalions.

A large number also served in combat in France, Turkey, Palestine, and Iraq. They served on the battlefields of France in the battles of Loos, Givenchy, and Neuve Chapelle; in Belgium at the battle of Ypres; in Iraq, Persia, Suez Canal and Palestine against Turkish advance, Gallipoli and Salonika. One detachment served with Lawrence of Arabia. During the Battle of Loos (June–December 1915) a battalion of the 8th Gurkhas fought to the last man, hurling themselves time after time against the weight of the German defences, and in the words of the Indian Corps commander, Lt. Gen. Sir James Willcocks, "found its Valhalla".

During the unsuccessful Gallipoli Campaign in 1915, the Gurkhas were among the first to arrive and the last to leave. The 1st/6th Gurkhas, having landed at Cape Helles, led the assault during the first major operation to take a Turkish high point, and in doing so captured a feature that later became known as "Gurkha Bluff". At Sari Bair they were the only troops in the whole campaign to reach and hold the crest line and look down on the straits, which was the ultimate objective. The 2nd Battalion of the 3rd Gurkha Rifles (2nd/3rd Gurkha Rifles) fought in the conquest of Baghdad.

Following the end of the war, the Gurkhas were returned to India, and during the inter-war years were largely kept away from the internal strife and urban conflicts of the sub-continent, instead being employed largely on the frontiers and in the hills where fiercely independent tribesmen were a constant source of trouble.

As such, between the World Wars the Gurkha regiments fought in the Third Afghan War in 1919. The regiments then participated in numerous campaigns on the North-West Frontier, mainly in Waziristan, where they were employed as garrison troops defending the frontier. They kept the peace among the local populace and engaged with the lawless and often openly hostile Pathan tribesmen.

During this time the North-West Frontier was the scene of considerable political and civil unrest and troops stationed at Razmak, Bannu, and Wanna saw extensive action.

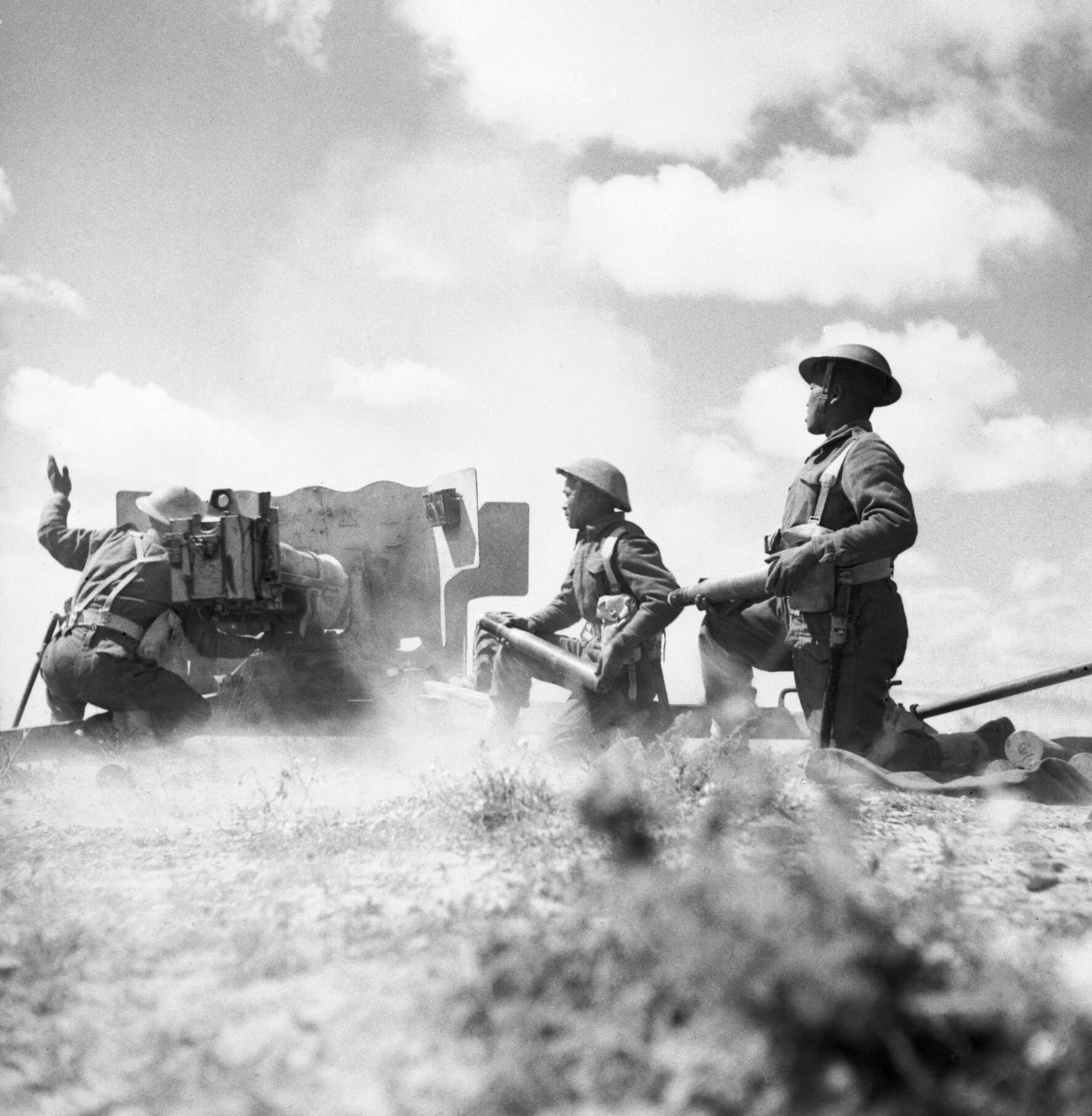
Gurkhas in action with a six-pounder anti-tank gun in Tunisia, 16 March 1943

During World War II (1939–1945) there were ten Gurkha regiments, with two battalions each, making a total of 20 pre-war battalions. Following the Dunkirk evacuation of the British Expeditionary Force (BEF) in 1940, the Nepalese government offered to increase recruitment to enlarge the number of Gurkha battalions in British service to 35. This would eventually rise to 43 battalions.

In order to achieve the increased number of battalions, third and fourth battalions were raised for all ten regiments, with fifth battalions also being raised for 1 GR, 2 GR and 9 GR. This expansion required ten training centers to be established for basic training and regimental records across India. In addition, five training battalions (14 GR, 29 GR, 38 GR, 56 GR and 710 GR) were raised, while other units (25 GR and 26 GR) were raised as garrison battalions for keeping the peace in India and defending rear areas. Large numbers of Gurkha men were also recruited for non-Gurkha units, and other specialized duties such as paratroops, signals, engineers and military police.

A total of 250,280 Gurkhas served in 40 battalions, plus eight Nepalese Army battalions, parachute, training, garrison and porter units during the war, in almost all theatres. In addition to keeping peace in India, Gurkhas fought in Syria, North Africa, Italy, Greece and against the Japanese in the jungles of Burma, northeast India and also Singapore. They did so with distinction, earning 2,734 bravery awards in the process and suffering around 32,000 casualties in all theatres.

=== Gurkha military rank system in the British Indian Army ===
Gurkha ranks in the British Indian Army followed the same pattern as those used throughout the rest of the Indian Army at that time. As in the British Army itself, there were three distinct levels: private soldiers, non-commissioned officers, and commissioned officers. Gurkha commissioned officers in Gurkha regiments held a "Viceroy's Commission", distinct from the King's or Queen's Commission that British officers serving with a Gurkha regiment held. Any Gurkha holding a commission was technically subordinate to any British officer, regardless of rank.

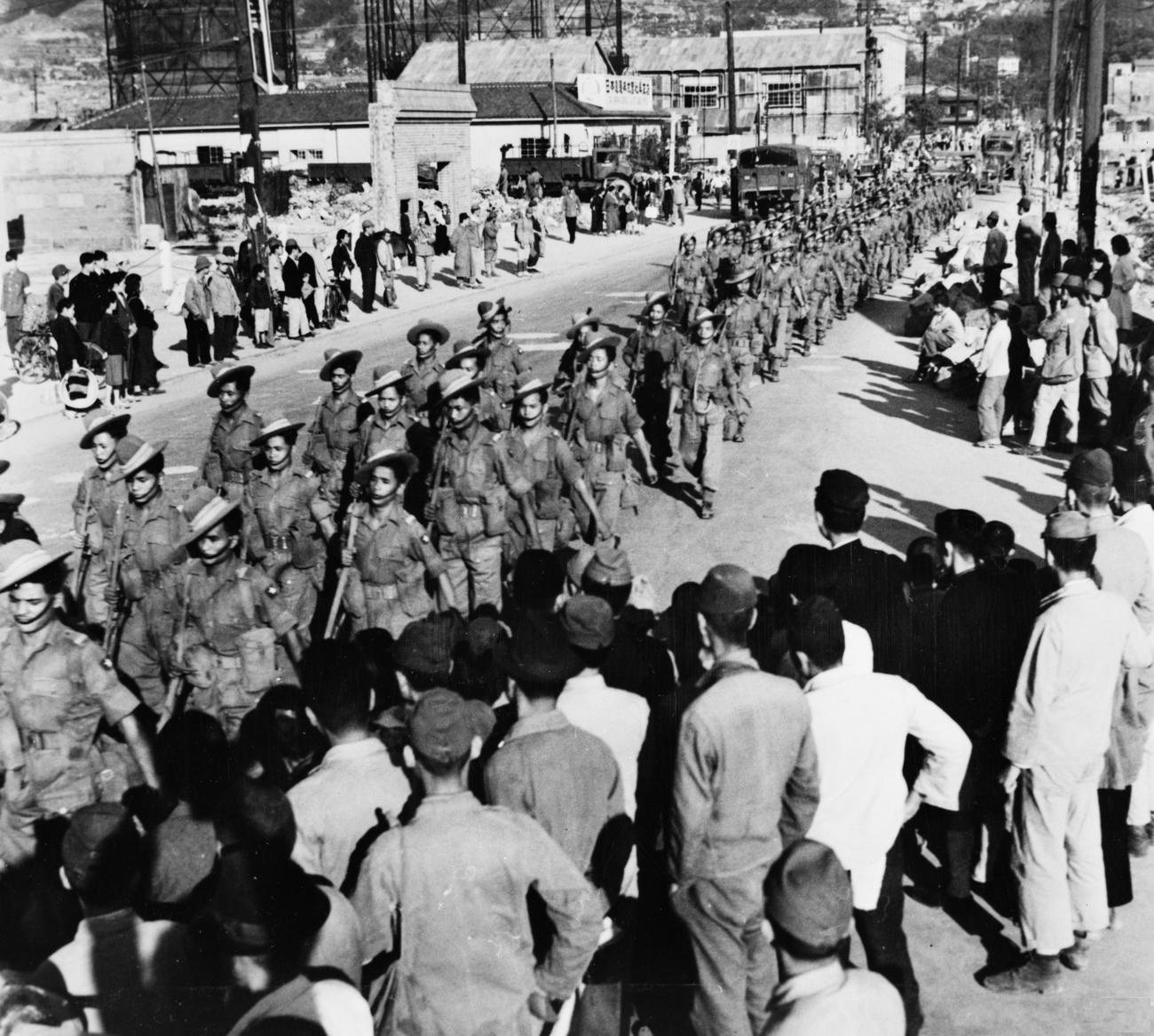
The 2nd/5th Royal Gurkha Rifles marching through Kure soon after their arrival in Japan in May 1946 as part of the Allied forces of occupation

==== Rank equivalents in modern Indian and British Armies ====
British Indian Army	Modern Indian Army	British Army	NATO code
Viceroy Commissioned Officers (VCOs, –1947) and Junior Commissioned Officers (JCOs, 1947–)
Subedar Major	Subedar Major	no equivalent	—N/a
Subedar	Subedar	no equivalent	—N/a
Jemadar	Naib Subedar	no equivalent	—N/a
Warrant officers
Regimental Havildar Major	Regimental Havildar Major	Warrant Officer Class 1	OR-9
Company Havildar Major	Company Havildar Major	Warrant Officer Class 2	OR-8
Non-commissioned officers
Company Quartermaster Havildar	Company Quartermaster Havildar	Colour Sergeant	OR-7
Havildar	Havildar	Sergeant	OR-6, OR-5
Naik	Naik	Corporal	OR-4
Lance Naik	Lance Naik	Lance Corporal	OR-3
Enlisted
(no rank)	(no rank)	Private	OR-2, OR-1

Notes

- British Army officers received Queen's or King's Commissions, but Gurkha officers in this system received the Viceroy's Commission. After Indian independence in 1947, Gurkha officers in regiments which became part of the British Army received the King's (later Queen's) Gurkha Commission, and were known as King's/Queen's Gurkha Officers (KGO/QGO). Gurkha officers had no authority to command troops of British regiments. The QGO Commission was abolished in 2007.
- Jemadars and subedars normally served as platoon commanders and company 2ICs but were junior to all British officers, while the subedar major was the Commanding Officer's advisor on the men and their welfare. For a long time it was impossible for Gurkhas to progress further, except that an honorary lieutenancy or captaincy was (very rarely) bestowed upon a Gurkha on retirement.
- The equivalent ranks in the post-1947 Indian Army were (and are) known as Junior Commissioned Officers (JCOs). They retained the traditional rank titles used in the British Indian Army: Jemadar (later Naib Subedar), Subedar and Subedar Major.
- While in principle any British subject may apply for a commission without having served in the ranks, Gurkhas cannot. It was customary for a Gurkha soldier to rise through the ranks and prove his ability before his regiment would consider offering him a commission.
- From the 1920s Gurkhas could also receive King's Indian Commissions, and later full King's or Queen's Commissions, which put them on a par with British officers. This was rare until after the Second World War.
- Gurkha officers commissioned from the Royal Military Academy Sandhurst and Short Service Officers regularly fill appointments up to the rank of major. At least two Gurkhas have been promoted to lieutenant colonel and there is theoretically now no bar to further progression.
- After 1948, the Brigade of Gurkhas (part of the British Army) was formed and adopted standard British Army rank structure and nomenclature, except for the three Viceroy Commission ranks between Warrant Officer 1 and Second Lieutenant (jemadar, subedar and subedar major) which remained, albeit with different rank titles Lieutenant (Queens Gurkha Officer), Captain (QGO) and Major (QGO). The QGO commission was abolished in 2007; Gurkha soldiers are currently commissioned as Late Entry Officers (as above).

=== Regiments of the Gurkha Rifles (c. 1815–1947) ===
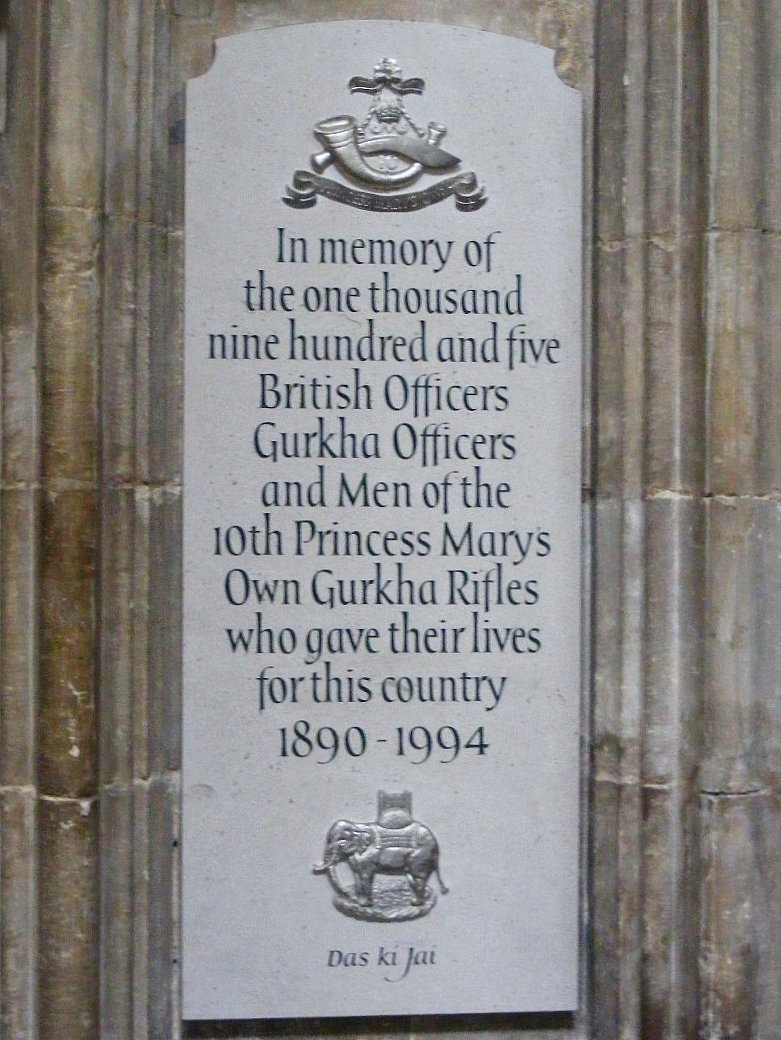
Memorial of 10th Princess Mary's Own Gurkha Rifles, Winchester Cathedral, Hampshire

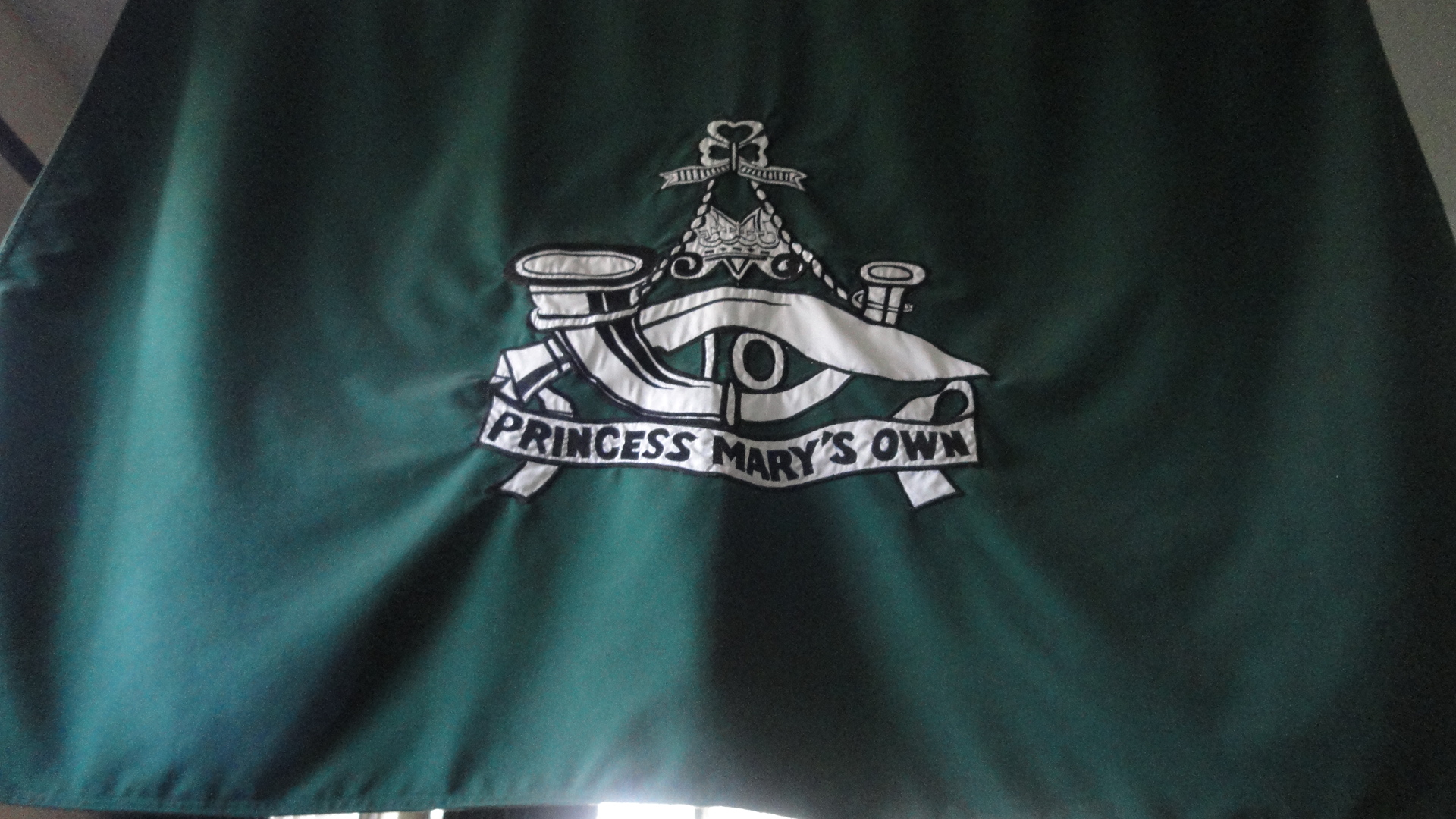
Princess Mary's Own

- 1st King George V's Own Gurkha Rifles (The Malaun Regiment) (raised 1815, allocated to Indian Army at independence in 1947)
- 2nd King Edward VII's Own Gurkha Rifles (The Sirmoor Rifles) (raised 1815, allocated to British Army in 1948)
- 3rd Queen Alexandra's Own Gurkha Rifles (raised 1815, allocated to Indian Army at independence in 1947)
- 4th Prince of Wales's Own Gurkha Rifles (raised 1857, allocated to Indian Army at independence in 1947)
- 5th Royal Gurkha Rifles (Frontier Force) (raised 1858, allocated to Indian Army at independence in 1947)
- 6th Gurkha Rifles, renamed 6th Queen Elizabeth's Own Gurkha Rifles in 1959 (raised 1817, allocated to British Army in 1948)
- 7th Gurkha Rifles, renamed 7th Duke of Edinburgh's Own Gurkha Rifles in 1959 (raised 1902, allocated to British Army in 1948)
- 8th Gurkha Rifles (raised 1824, allocated to Indian Army at independence in 1947)
- 9th Gurkha Rifles (raised 1817, allocated to Indian Army at independence in 1947)
- 10th Princess Mary's Own Gurkha Rifles (raised 1890, allocated to British Army in 1948)
- 11th Gurkha Rifles (1918–1922; raised again by India – 11 Gorkha Rifles – following independence in 1947)
- 25th Gurkha Rifles (1942–1946)
- 26th Gurkha Rifles (1943–1946)
- 29th Gurkha Rifles (1943–1946)
- 42nd Gurkha Rifles (raised 1817 as the Cuttack Legion, renamed 6th Gurkha Rifles in 1903)
- 44th Gurkha Rifles (raised 1824 as the 16th (Sylhet) Local Battalion, renamed 8th Gurkha Rifles in 1903)

=== Second World War training battalions ===
- 14th Gurkha Rifles Training Battalion
- 29th Gurkha Rifles Training Battalion
- 38th Gurkha Rifles Training Battalion
- 56th Gurkha Rifles Training Battalion
- 710th Gurkha Rifles Training Battalion

== Post-independence (1947–present) ==
THE GURKHA SOLDIER Bravest of the brave, most generous of the generous, never had country more faithful friends than you. Professor Sir Ralph Lilley Turner MC: Inscription on a monument to Gurkha soldiers (unveiled 1997, Whitehall, London)

Under the Tripartite Agreement signed between the governments of the United Kingdom, India and Nepal after Indian independence and the partition of India, the original ten Gurkha regiments consisting of the 20 pre-war battalions were split between the British Army and the newly independent Indian Army. Six Gurkha regiments (12 battalions) were transferred to the post-independence Indian Army, while four regiments (eight battalions) were transferred to the British Army.

To the disappointment of many of their British officers, the majority of Gurkhas given a choice between British or Indian Army service opted for the latter. The reason appears to have been the pragmatic one that the Gurkha regiments of the Indian Army would continue to serve in their existing roles in familiar territory and under terms and conditions that were well established. The only substantial change was the substitution of Indian officers for British. By contrast, the four regiments selected for British service faced an uncertain future, initially in Malaya - a region where relatively few Gurkhas had previously served. The four regiments (or eight battalions) in British service were subsequently reduced to a single regiment of two battalions. The Indian units have been expanded beyond their pre-Independence establishment of 12 battalions.

The principal aim of the Tripartite Agreement was to ensure that Gurkhas serving under the Crown would be paid on the same scale as those serving in the new Indian Army. This was significantly lower than the standard British rates of pay. While the difference is made up through cost of living and location allowances during a Gurkha's actual period of service, the pension payable on his return to Nepal is much lower than would be the case for his British counterparts.

With the abolition of the Nepalese monarchy in 2008, the future recruitment of Gurkhas for British and Indian service was initially put into doubt. A spokesperson for the Communist Party of Nepal (Maoist) (later the "Communist Party of Nepal (Maoist Centre)"), which was expected to play a major role in the new secular republic, stated that recruitment as mercenaries was degrading to the Nepalese people and would be banned. However, as of 2023, Gurkha recruitment for foreign service continues.

=== British Army Gurkhas ===
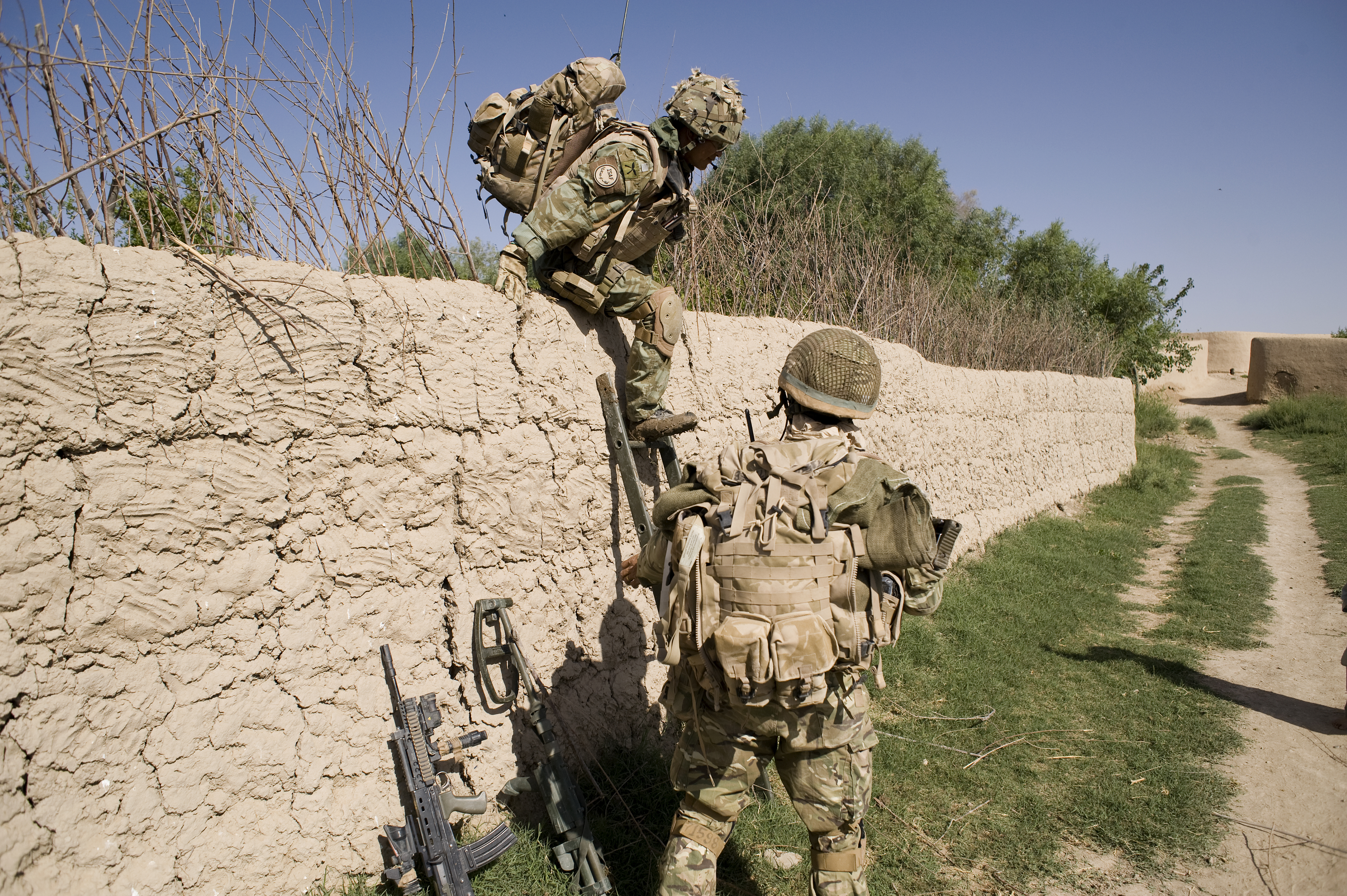
Soldiers from 1st Battalion, The Royal Gurkha Rifles on patrol in Helmand Province in Afghanistan in 2010.

Four Gurkha regiments were transferred to the British Army on 1 January 1948:

- 2nd King Edward VII's Own Gurkha Rifles (The Sirmoor Rifles)
- 6th Queen Elizabeth's Own Gurkha Rifles
- 7th Duke of Edinburgh's Own Gurkha Rifles
- 10th Princess Mary's Own Gurkha Rifles

They formed the Brigade of Gurkhas and were initially stationed in Malaya. There were also a number of additional Gurkha units including the 69th and 70th Gurkha Field Squadrons, both included in the 36th Engineer Regiment. Since then, British Gurkhas have served in Borneo during the confrontation with Indonesia, in the Falklands War and on various peacekeeping missions in Sierra Leone, East Timor, Bosnia and Kosovo.

Major Gurkha Formations:

- 43rd Independent Gurkha Infantry Brigade (Italy, circa 1943)
- 26th Gurkha Brigade (Hong Kong, 1948–1950)
- 17th Gurkha Division (Malaya, 1952–1970)
- 51st Infantry Brigade (Hong Kong disbanded 1976)
- 48th Gurkha Infantry Brigade (Hong Kong, 1957–1976; renamed Gurkha Field Force 1976–1997; returned to old title 1987 – c. 1992)

As of August 2021, the Brigade of Gurkhas in the British Army has the following units:

- 1st Battalion, The Royal Gurkha Rifles (1RGR)
- 2nd Battalion, The Royal Gurkha Rifles (2RGR)
- 3rd Battalion, The Royal Gurkha Rifles (3RGR)
- Gurkha Allied Rapid Reaction Corps Support Battalion (Note: In August 2021, the battalion added the subtitle 'Gurkha'. Though the battalion has had Gurkhas for many years, it is now officially been subsumed into the Brigade of Gurkhas.)
- Queen's Gurkha Signals which includes:
  - 250 Gurkha Signal Squadron, 30 Signal Regiment
  - 246 Gurkha Signal Squadron, 2 Signal Regiment
  - 247 Gurkha Signal Squadron, 16 Signal Regiment
  - 248 Gurkha Signal Squadron, 22 Signal Regiment
  - 249 Gurkha Signal Squadron, 3rd (UK) Division Signal Regiment
- 10 Queen's Own Gurkha Logistic Regiment RLC
- Queen's Gurkha Engineers, which includes:
  - 69th Gurkha Field Squadron, 36 Engineer Regiment
  - 70th Gurkha Field Squadron, 36 Engineer Regiment
- Gurkha Staff and Personnel Support Company
- Band of the Brigade of Gurkhas
- Gurkha Company (Sittang), Royal Military Academy Sandhurst
- Gurkha Wing (Mandalay), Infantry Battle School
- Gurkha Company (Tavoleto), Land Warfare Centre

The Brigade of Gurkhas also has its own chefs posted among the above-mentioned units. Gurkhas were among the troops who retook the Falklands in 1982 and have served a number of tours of duty in the War in Afghanistan.

=== Indian Army Gurkhas ===
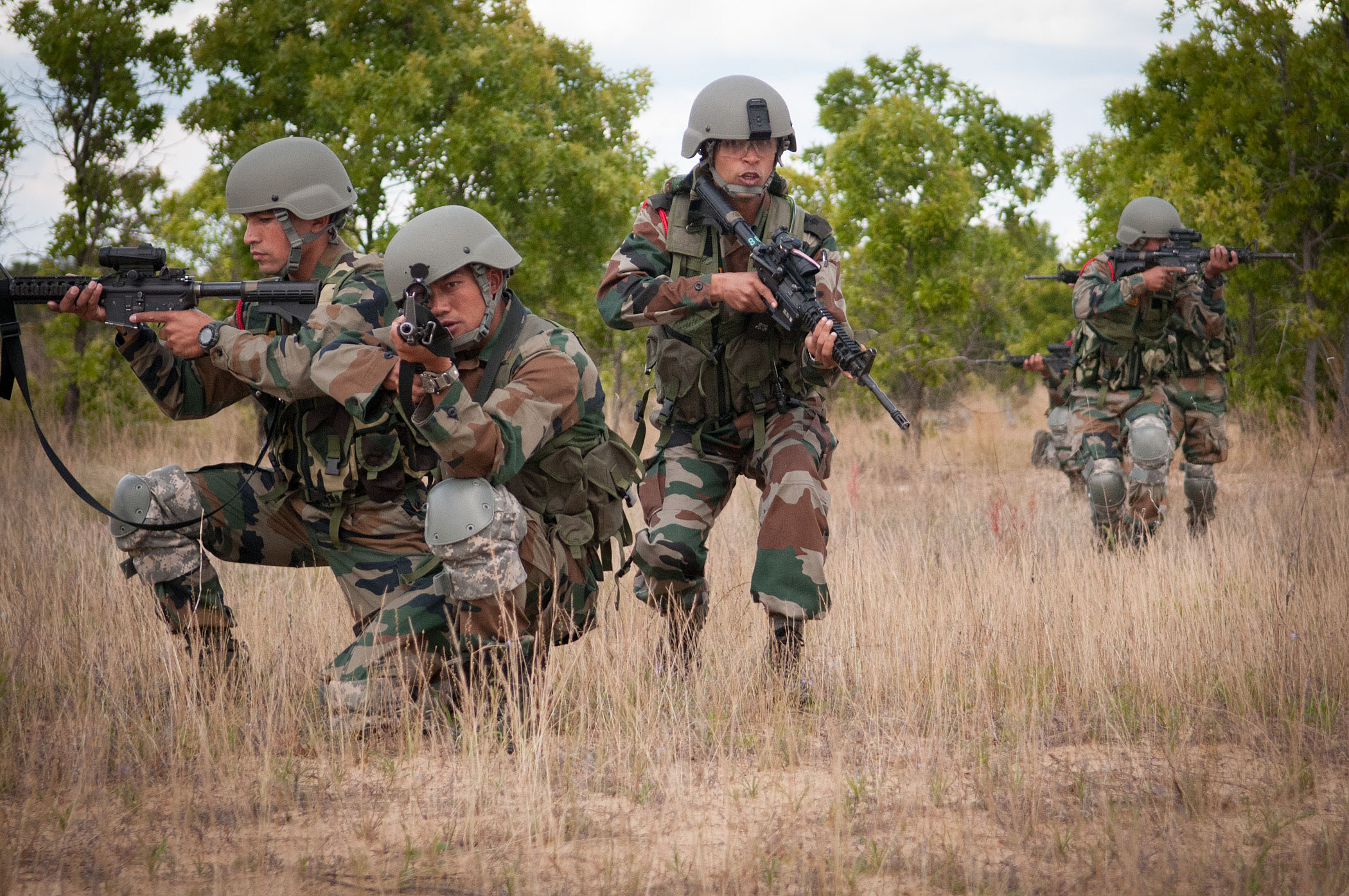
The soldiers of 5th Gurkha Rifles of the Indian Army take position during a training exercise.

Upon independence in 1947, six of the original ten Gurkha regiments remained with the Indian Army. These regiments were:

- 1st King George V's Own Gurkha Rifles (The Malaun Regiment)
- 3rd Queen Alexandra's Own Gurkha Rifles
- 4th Prince of Wales's Own Gurkha Rifles
- 5th Royal Gurkha Rifles (Frontier Force)
- 8th Gurkha Rifles
- 9th Gurkha Rifles

Additionally, a further regiment, 11 Gorkha Rifles, was raised. In 1949 the spelling was changed from "Gurkha" to the original "Gorkha". All royal titles were dropped when India became a republic in 1950.

Since partition, the Gurkha regiments that were transferred to the Indian Army have established themselves as a permanent and vital part of the newly independent Indian Army. Indeed, while Britain has reduced its Gurkha contingent, India has continued to recruit Gorkhas of Nepal into Gorkha regiments in large numbers, as well as Indian Gorkhas. In 2009 the Indian Army had a Gorkha contingent that numbered around 42,000 men in 46 battalions, spread across seven regiments.

Although their deployment is still governed by the 1947 Tripartite Agreement, in the post-1947 conflicts India has fought in, Gorkhas have served in almost all of them, including the wars with Pakistan in 1947, 1965, 1971 and 1999 and also against China in 1962. They have also been used in peacekeeping operations around the world. They have also served in Sri Lanka conducting operations against the Tamil Tigers.

=== Singapore Gurkha Contingent ===
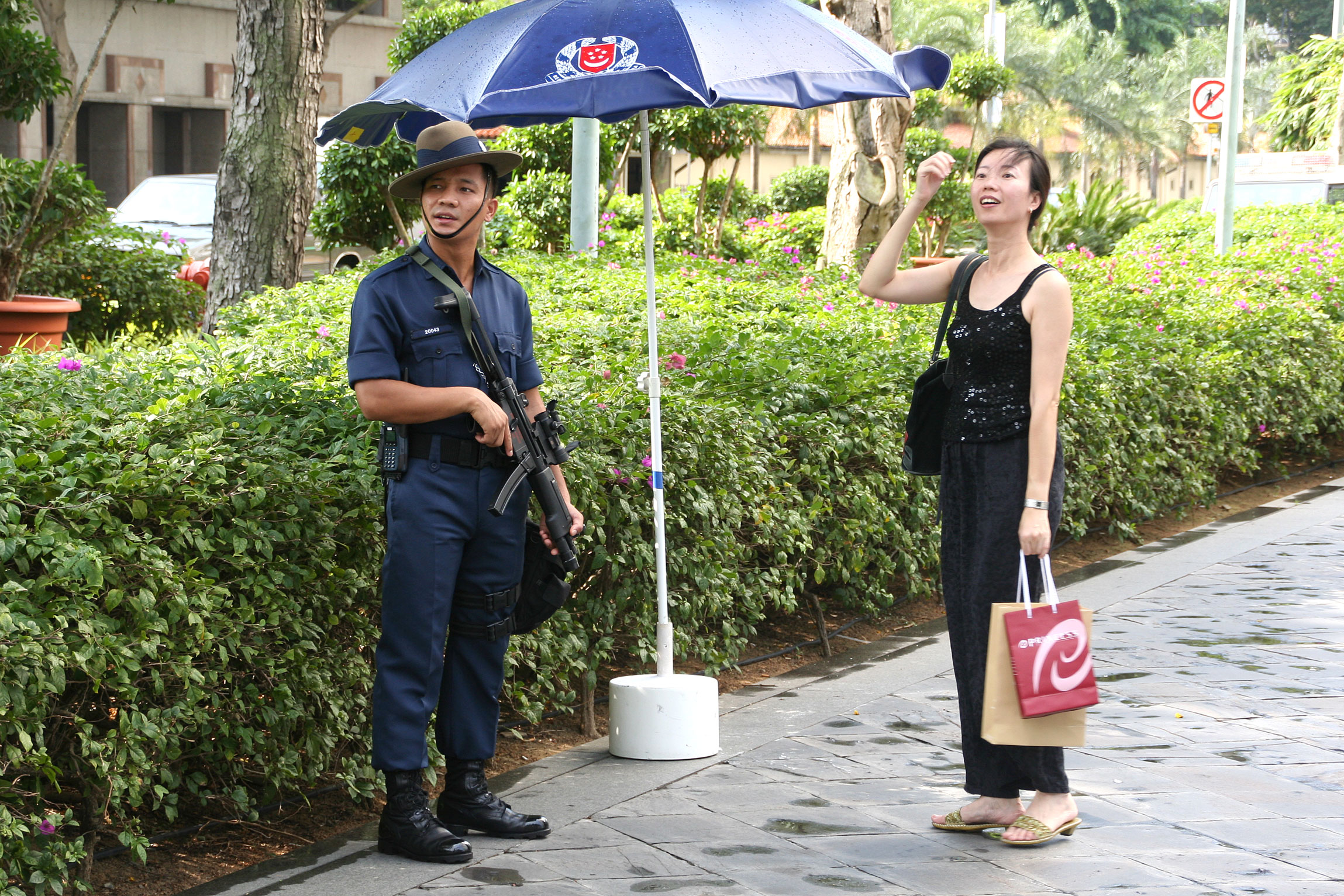
A trooper of the Gurkha Contingent of the Singapore Police Force gives directions to a civilian.

The Gurkha Contingent (GC) of the Singapore Police Force was formed on 9 April 1949 from selected ex-British Army Gurkhas. It is an integral part of the police force and was raised to replace a Sikh unit that had existed prior to the Japanese occupation during the Second World War.

The GC is a well trained, dedicated and disciplined body whose principal role is as riot police and counter-terrorism force. In times of crisis it can be deployed as a reaction force. During the turbulent years before and after independence, the GC acquitted itself well on several occasions during outbreaks of civil disorder. The Gurkhas displayed the courage, self-restraint and professionalism for which they are famous and earned the respect of the society at large.

=== Brunei Gurkha Reserve Unit ===
The Gurkha Reserve Unit (GRU) is a special guard and elite shock-troop force in the Sultanate of Brunei. The Brunei Reserve Unit employs about 500 Gurkhas. The majority are veterans of the British Army and the Singaporean Police, who have joined the GRU as a second career.

=== Indian Special Frontier Force ===
The Special Frontier Force (SFF) is an Indian paramilitary organization consisting of Tibetan refugees, Nepali Gurkhas, and other ethnic groups from mountainous areas. The SFF is tasked with conducting covert actions against China in the event of another Sino-Indian war. The SFF was originally intended to exclusively consist of Tibetan refugees living in India, however, the SFF began recruiting Nepali Gurkhas and hill tribesmen in 1965 to make up for a declining recruitment rate among Tibetans. It is believed there are around 700 Gurkhas serving in the SFF.

== Other ==
=== Victoria Cross recipients ===
There have been 26 Victoria Crosses (VC) awarded to soldiers of Gurkha regiments. The first was awarded in 1858 and the last in 1965. Thirteen of the recipients have been British officers serving with Gurkha regiments. Since 1915, the majority have been awarded to Gurkhas serving in the ranks as private soldiers or NCOs. Since Indian independence in 1947, Gurkhas serving in the Indian Army have been awarded three Param Vir Chakras, which are equivalent to the Victoria Cross.

Two George Cross (GC) medals have been awarded to Gurkha soldiers for acts of bravery. The George Cross (GC) is the highest award bestowed by the British government for non-operational gallantry or gallantry not in the presence of an enemy. In the UK honours system, the George Cross is equal in stature to the Victoria Cross. This has been the case since the introduction of the George Cross in 1940.

=== Treatment of Gurkhas in the United Kingdom ===
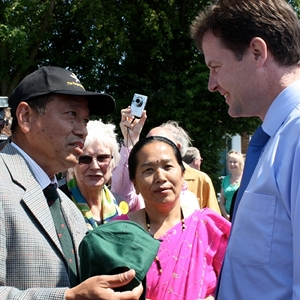
Nick Clegg being presented a Gurkha Hat by a Gurkha veteran during his Maidstone visit, to celebrate the success of their joint campaign for the right to live in the UK, 2009

The treatment of Gurkhas and their families was the subject of controversy in the United Kingdom once it became widely known that Gurkhas received smaller pensions than their British counterparts. The nationality status of Gurkhas and their families was also an area of dispute, with claims that some ex-army Nepali families were being denied residency and forced to leave Britain. On 8 March 2007 the British Government announced that all Gurkhas who signed up after 1 July 1997 would receive a pension equivalent to that of their British counterparts. In addition, Gurkhas would, for the first time, be able to transfer to another army unit after five years' service and women would also be allowed to join, although not in first-line units, conforming to the British Army's policy. The act also guaranteed residency rights in the UK for retired Gurkhas and their families.

Despite the changes, many Gurkhas who had not served long enough to entitle them to a pension faced hardship on their return to Nepal, and some critics derided the government's decision to only award the new pension and citizenship entitlement to those joining after 1 July 1997, claiming that this left many ex-Gurkha servicemen still facing a financially uncertain retirement. An advocacy group, Gurkha Justice Campaign, joined the debate in support of the Gurkhas.

In a landmark ruling on 30 September 2008, Mr Justice Blake in the High Court in London decided that the Home Secretary's policy allowing Gurkhas who left the Army before 1997 to apply for settlement in the United Kingdom was irrationally restrictive in its criteria, and overturned it. He upheld the claim of six Gurkha soldiers for the right to settle in Britain at the end of their service, reciting the Military Covenant and observing that granting them residence in Britain "would, in my judgment, be a vindication and an enhancement of this covenant". In response to the decision of the High Court, the Home Office said it would review all cases that were affected by it.

On 29 April 2009 a motion introduced by the Liberal Democrats that all Gurkhas be offered equal right of residence was passed in the House of Commons by 267 votes to 246. This was the only first-day motion defeat for a government since 1978. Nick Clegg, the Liberal Democrat leader, stated that "this is an immense victory ... for the rights of Gurkhas who have been waiting so long for justice, a victory for Parliament, a victory for decency." He added that it was "the kind of thing people want this country to do".

On 21 May 2009 Home Secretary Jacqui Smith announced that all Gurkha veterans who retired before 1997 with at least four years service would be allowed to settle in the UK. Actress Joanna Lumley, daughter of Gurkha corps Major James Lumley who had highlighted the treatment of the Gurkhas and campaigned for their rights, commented, "This is the welcome we have always longed to give".

A charity, The Gurkha Welfare Trust, provides aid to alleviate hardship and distress among Gurkha ex-servicemen.

On 9 June 2015, a celebration called the Gurkha 200, held at The Royal Hospital Chelsea and attended by members of the royal family, commemorated the bicentennial of the Gurkha Welfare Trust by paying tribute to Gurkha culture and military service.

Gurkha Square in Fleet, Hampshire, which contains the Fleet war memorial, is named after the Gurkhas.

==== Settlement rights ====
A 2008 UK High Court decision on a test case in London, R. (on the application of Limbu) v Secretary of State for the Home Department [2008] EWHC 2261 (Admin), acknowledged the "debt of honour" to Gurkhas discharged before 1997. The Home Secretary's policy allowing veterans to apply on a limited set of criteria (such as connection to the United Kingdom) was quashed as being unduly restrictive. The Court found that the Gurkhas had suffered a "historic injustice" and that the policy was irrational in failing to take into account factors such as length of service or particularly meritorious conduct.

== See also ==
- Military of Nepal
- Sino-Gurkha War
- Anglo-Nepalese War
- The Gurkha Welfare Trust
- The Gurkha Museum
- History of Nepal
- Ethnic groups in Nepal
- Nepali language
