= Henry Mordaunt (Royal Navy officer) =

Royal Navy officer (1682–1710)

- Died: 24 February 1710; Bath, Somerset
- Relatives: Charles Mordaunt, 3rd Earl of Peterborough (father)
- Military career
- Allegiance: Kingdom of Great Britain
- Branch: Royal Navy
- Service years: 1695–1710
- Rank: Captain
- Commands: HMS Resolution
- Conflicts: War of the Spanish Succession

Henry Mordaunt (c. 1682 – 24 February 1710) was a Royal Navy officer and Whig politician who sat in the English and British House of Commons from 1705 to 1710. He commanded a 70-gun ship of the line during the War of the Spanish Succession and being set upon by a superior French force, showed great courage in ensuring that his ship did not fall into enemy hands.

== Early life ==
Mordaunt was born in about 1682, the youngest son of Charles Mordaunt, 3rd Earl of Peterborough and his first wife Carey Fraser, daughter of Sir Alexander Fraser, 1st Baronet, of Dores, Inverness. By 1691 he had a role in the Queen's household which he held to 1694. In 1695, he was commissioned as a lieutenant in the Royal Navy.

== Career ==
Mordaunt was promoted to commander in April 1703. Through the influence of Lord Wharton, he was elected as Whig member for Malmesbury at the 1705 English general election. He was not active in Parliament, due to his frequent absences at sea but was able to support the Court with regard to the 'place clause' in the regency bill on 18 February 1706. In 1706 he was promoted to captain and was given command of HMS Resolution, a 70-gun third-rate ship of the line. At the time Britain was at war with France. He was commanding a small squadron of frigates to convoy his father from Spain to Genoa when off the coast of Italy on 19 March 1707 Resolution encountered six French vessels, each ranging between 58 and 80 guns. There followed an extended engagement, during which Resolution was badly damaged by French cannon fire. Mordaunt ordered the crew to run the ship aground rather than risk her capture by the French; this was achieved and she was subsequently set on fire to prevent her being refloated. The French maintained a continual gunfire on the burning wreck, and Mordaunt was struck in the thigh by a cannonball as he left the vessel. His father reached his destination and returned to England, and was able to obtain a pass for his son to travel home through France. Mordaunt survived the wound but was left unable to walk, and was forced to retire from the Navy.

Mordaunt returned to England in late 1707 and settled in the town of Bath. He was returned again as MP for Malmesbury at the 1708 British general election. He had to attend a court martial in November 1709 for the loss of his ship, but was acquitted of any charges and declared to have shown great courage. He intended to go to sea again but contracted smallpox.

== Death and legacy ==
Mordaunt died unmarried of smallpox at Bath on 24 February 1710 and was buried in the family vault at Turvey, Bedfordshire.

Parliament of England
Preceded by Thomas Boucher; Edward Pauncefort	Member of Parliament for Malmesbury; 1705–1707; With: Thomas Farrington	Succeeded by Parliament of Great Britain
Parliament of Great Britain
Preceded by Parliament of England	Member of Parliament for Malmesbury; 1707–1710; With: Thomas Farrington	Succeeded by Thomas Farrington; Joseph Addison
