= HMS Resolution =

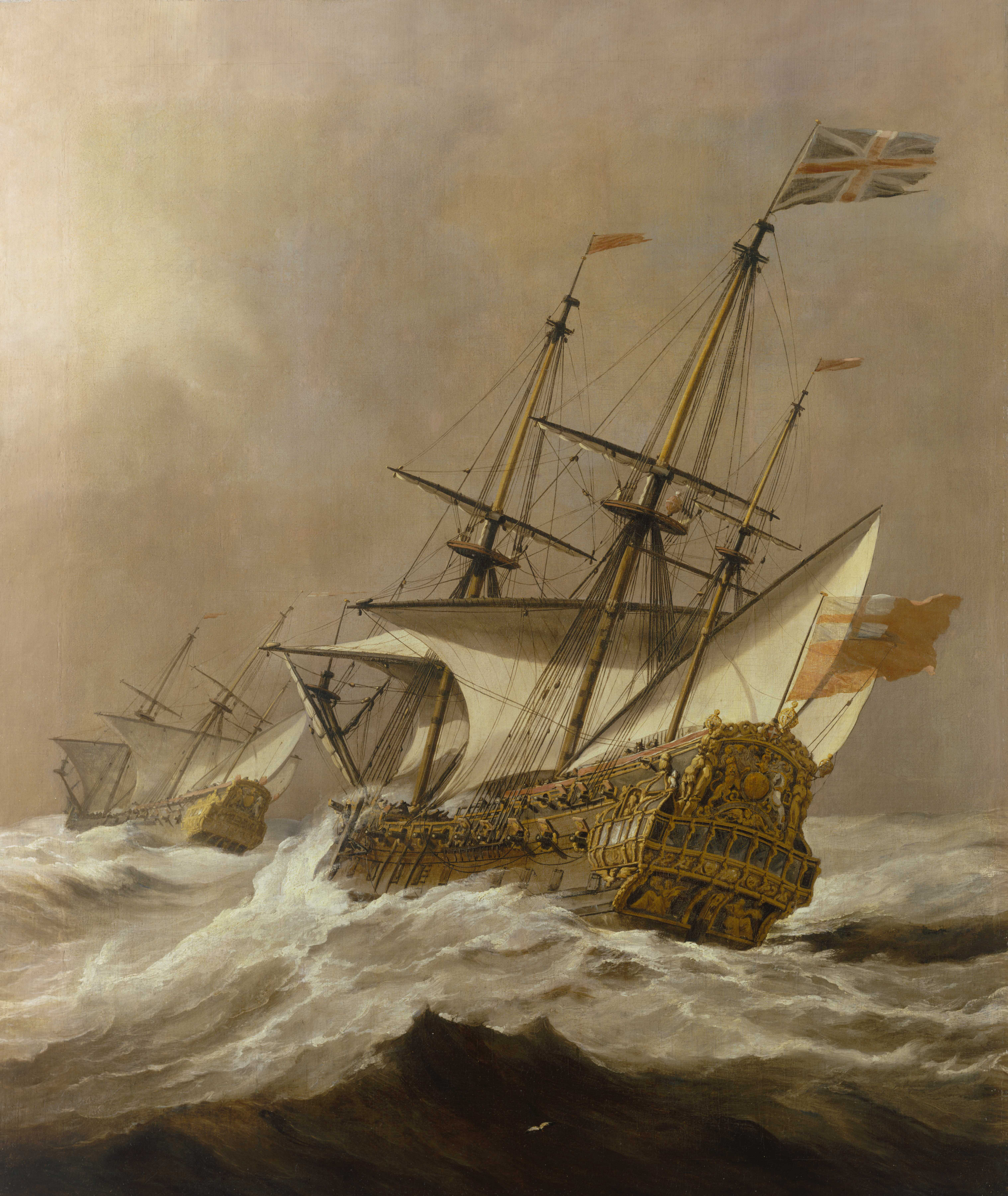
Resolution in a gale by Willem van de Velde, the younger depicts the second Resolution c. 1678

Several ships of the Royal Navy have borne the name HMS Resolution:

- English ship Resolution (1650) a first rate launched as Prince Royal in 1610 was renamed Resolution in 1650 following the inauguration of the Commonwealth, and continued to bear that name until 1660, when the name Prince Royal was restored
- HMS Resolution (1660), a 50-gun third-rate frigate launched 1654 as Tredagh; renamed Resolution 1660; destroyed after grounding by a Dutch fireship in the St James's Day Battle 4 August 1666.
- HMS Resolution (1667), a 70-gun third-rate ship of the line launched 1667; rebuilt 1698; foundered in 1703.
- HMS Resolution (1705), a 70-gun third rate launched 1705; run ashore to avoid capture 1707.
- HMS Resolution (1708), a 70-gun third rate launched 1708; wrecked 1711.
- HMS Resolution (1758), a 74-gun third rate launched 1758; run aground and lost 1759 at the Battle of Quiberon Bay.
- HMS Resolution (1770), a 74-gun third rate launched 1770; broken up 1813.
- HMS Resolution (1771), the vessel of Captain James Cook in his explorations.
- HMS Resolution (1779), a cutter purchased 1779; went missing in the North Sea June 1797, presumed to have foundered.
- HMS Resolution (1892), a Royal Sovereign-class battleship in service from 1893 to 1914.
- HMS Resolution (09), a Revenge-class battleship in service from 1915 to 1944.
- HMS Resolution (S22), lead ship of the Resolution-class ballistic missile submarines in service from 1966 to 1994.

== Battle honours ==
Ships named Resolution of the Royal Navy have earned the following battle honours:

- Kentish Knock, 1652
- Gabbard, 1653
- Scheveningen, 1653
- Lowestoft, 1665
- Four Days' Battle, 1666
- Orfordness, 1666
- Sole Bay, 1672
- Schooneveld, 1673
- Texel, 1673
- Barfleur, 1692
- Quiberon Bay, 1759
- St Vincent, 1780
- St Kitts, 1782
- The Saints, 1782
- Basque Roads, 1809
- Atlantic, 1939−40
- Norway, 1940

== Other British warships named Resolution ==
- Resolution was a gunboat that the garrison at Gibraltar launched in June 1782 during the Great Siege of Gibraltar. She was one of 12. Each was armed with an 18-pounder gun, and received a crew of 21 men drawn from Royal Navy vessels stationed at Gibraltar. Brilliant provided Resolution's crew.
- HMS Resolution, a cutter in the West Indies, date of acquisition unknown and date of loss unknown. On 10 November 1800 Captain Peter Halkett of HMS Apollo captured the Spanish sloop of war Resolution in the West Indies. She was armed with 18 guns and had a crew of 149 men, under the command of Don Francisco Darrichena. Halkett reported that she was the former British navy cutter Resolution. Resolution was in such an irreparable state that after a few days Halkett destroyed her.
- Resolution, a victualing hoy, of 75 tons, offered for sale on 22 September 1828, lying at Deptford.

== See also ==
- HMNZS Resolution, a survey ship of the Royal New Zealand Navy in service between 1997 and 2012. Named after the 1771-launched Resolution commanded by James Cook.
