= Governor Montagu =

Governor Montagu or Montague may refer to:

- John Montagu (Royal Navy officer) (1719–1795), Commodore Governor of Newfoundland from 1776 to 1778
- Lord Charles Montagu (1741–1784), Royal Governor of the Province of South Carolina from 1766 to 1773
- Edmund Montague, Acting Governor of Fort St George in 1709
