= Joseph Addison =

British writer and politician (1672–1719)

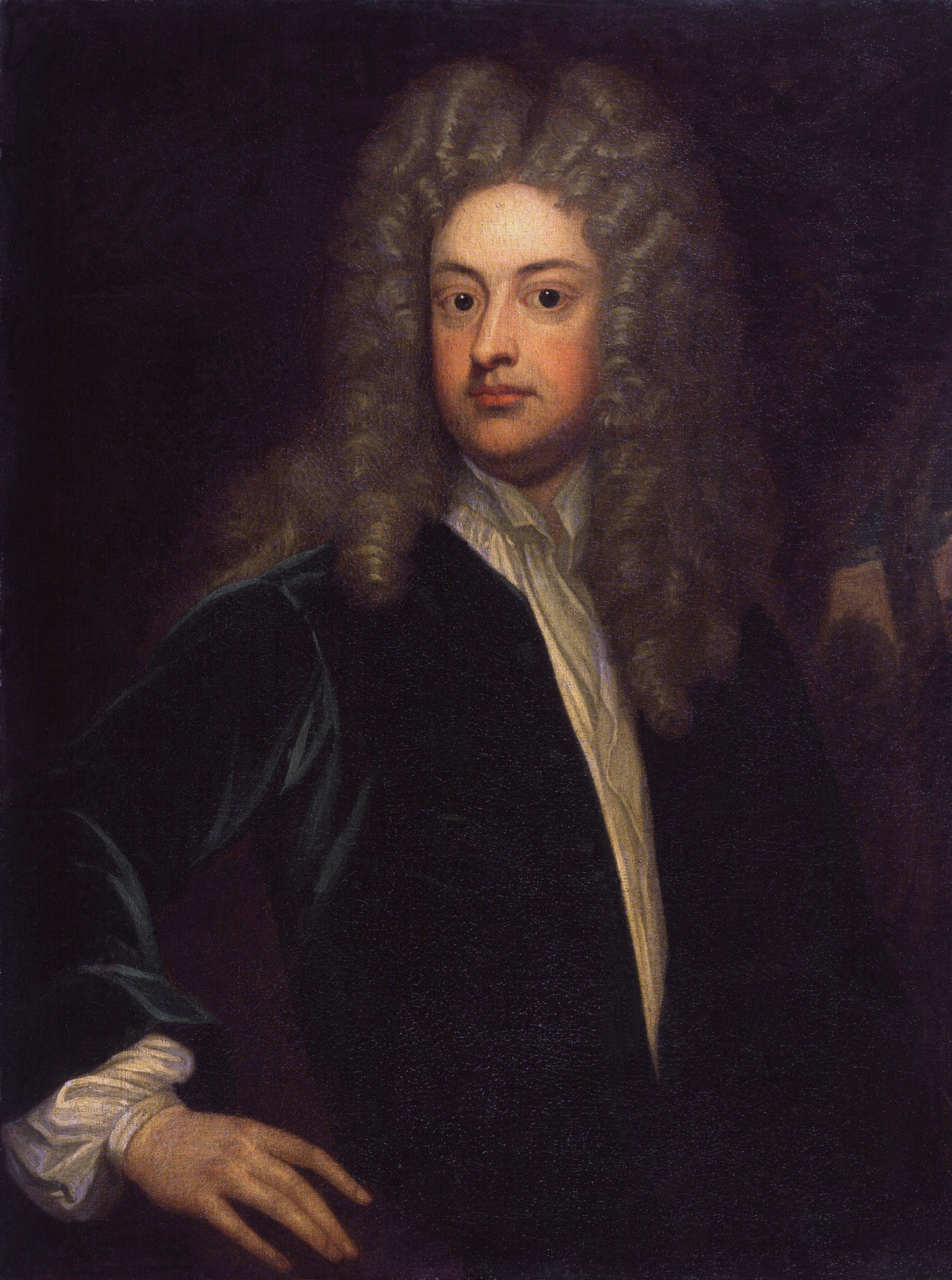
- Portrait by Sir Godfrey Kneller, c. 1703–1712
- Born: 1 May 1672; Milston, Wiltshire, England
- Died: 17 June 1719 (aged 47); Kensington, Middlesex, England
- Education: The Queen's College, Oxford
- Occupations: Writer; journalist; politician
- Employer: Magdalen College, Oxford
- Political party: Whigs
- Father: Lancelot Addison
- Relatives: Gulston Addison (brother)
- Writing career
- Language: English; Latin
- Period: from 1693
- Genres: Poetry; playwright; libretto; essay; editorial; translation
- Notable work: Cato, a Tragedy
- Movement: Classicism

Member of Parliament for the borough of Lostwithiel
- In office 1708–1709

Secretary of State for the Southern Department
- In office 12 April 1717 – 14 March 1718

Joseph Addison (1 May 1672 – 17 June 1719) was a British writer and politician. He was the eldest son of Lancelot Addison. His name is usually remembered alongside that of his long-standing friend Richard Steele, with whom he founded The Spectator magazine. His simple prose style marked the end of the mannerisms and conventional classical images of the 17th century. Addison is also famous for his play Cato, a Tragedy, written in 1712.

== Early life and education ==
Addison was born on 1 May 1672, in Milston, Wiltshire, but soon after his birth his father, Lancelot Addison, was appointed Dean of Lichfield and the family moved into the cathedral close. His father was a scholarly English clergyman. Joseph was educated at Charterhouse School, London, where he first met Richard Steele, and at The Queen's College, Oxford. He excelled in classics, being specially noted for his Neo-Latin verse, and became a fellow of Magdalen College.

In 1693, he addressed a poem to John Dryden, and his first major work, a book of the lives of English poets, was published in 1694. His translation of Virgil's Georgics was published in the same year. Dryden, Lord Somers and Charles Montague, 1st Earl of Halifax, took an interest in Addison's work and obtained for him a pension of £300 a year to enable him to travel to Europe with a view to diplomatic employment, all the time writing and studying politics.

While in Switzerland, in 1702, he heard of the death of William III, an event which lost him his pension as his influential contacts, Halifax and Somers, had lost their employment with the Crown.

== Career ==
When All Thy Mercies, O My God!

When all thy mercies, O my God!
My rising soul surveys,
Transported with the view, I’m lost
In wonder, love, and praise.

Thy Providence my life sustained,
And all my wants redresed,
When in the silent womb I lay,
And hung upon the breast.

When in the slippery paths of youth
With heedless steps I ran,
Thine arm unseen conveyed me safe,
And led me up to man.

Through hidden dangers, toils, and deaths,
It gently cleared my way,
And through the pleasing snares of vice, -
More to be feared than they.

Ten thousand thousand precious gifts
My daily thanks employ;
Nor is the least a cheerful heart,
That tastes those gifts with joy.

Through every period of my life
Thy goodness I’ll pursue;
And after death, in distant worlds,
The glorious theme renew.

When nature fails, and day and night
Divide thy works no more,
My ever-grateful heart, O Lord,
Thy mercy shall adore.

Through all eternity to thee
A joyful song I’ll raise;
For O, eternity’s too short
To utter all thy praise!

— From the "When All Thy Mercies, O My God!" poem by Joseph Addison

=== Political career ===
Addison returned to England at the end of 1703. For more than a year he remained unemployed, but the Battle of Blenheim in 1704 gave him a fresh opportunity to distinguish himself. The government, specifically Lord Treasurer Godolphin, commissioned Addison to write a commemorative poem about the battle, and he produced The Campaign, which was received with such satisfaction that he was appointed Commissioner of Appeals in Halifax's government.

His next literary venture was an account of his travels in Italy, Remarks on several parts of Italy, &c., in the years 1701, 1702, 1703, published in 1705 by Jacob Tonson.

In 1705, with the Whigs in power, Addison was made Under-Secretary of State and accompanied Lord Halifax on a diplomatic mission to Hannover, Germany. A biography of Addison states: "In the field of his foreign responsibilities Addison's views were those of a good Whig. He had always believed that England's power depended upon her wealth, her wealth upon her commerce, and her commerce upon the freedom of the seas and the checking of the power of France and Spain."

In 1708 and 1709, Addison was a Member of Parliament for the borough of Lostwithiel. He was soon appointed secretary to the new Lord Lieutenant of Ireland, Lord Wharton. Under the direction of Wharton, he was an MP in the Irish House of Commons for Cavan Borough from 1709 until 1713. In 1710, he represented Malmesbury, in his home county of Wiltshire, holding the seat until his death in 1719.

=== Magazine founder ===
Addison met Jonathan Swift in Ireland and remained there for a year. Later, he helped form the Kitcat Club and renewed his friendship with Richard Steele. In 1709, Steele began to publish the Tatler, and Addison became a regular contributor. In 1711, they began The Spectator; its first issue appeared on 1 March 1711. This paper, which was originally a daily, was published until 20 December 1714, interrupted for a year by the publication of The Guardian in 1713. His last publication was The Freeholder, a political paper, in 1715–16.

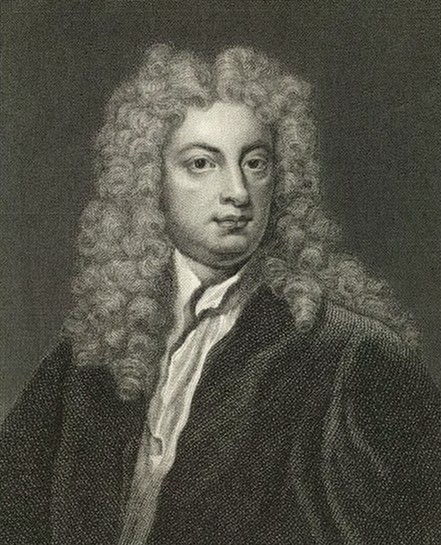
Joseph Addison: engraving after the Kneller portrait

=== Plays ===
He wrote the libretto for Thomas Clayton's opera Rosamond, which had a disastrous premiere in London in 1707. In 1713, Addison's tragedy Cato was produced, and was received with acclamation by both Whigs and Tories. He followed this effort with a comedic play, The Drummer (1716).

==== Cato ====
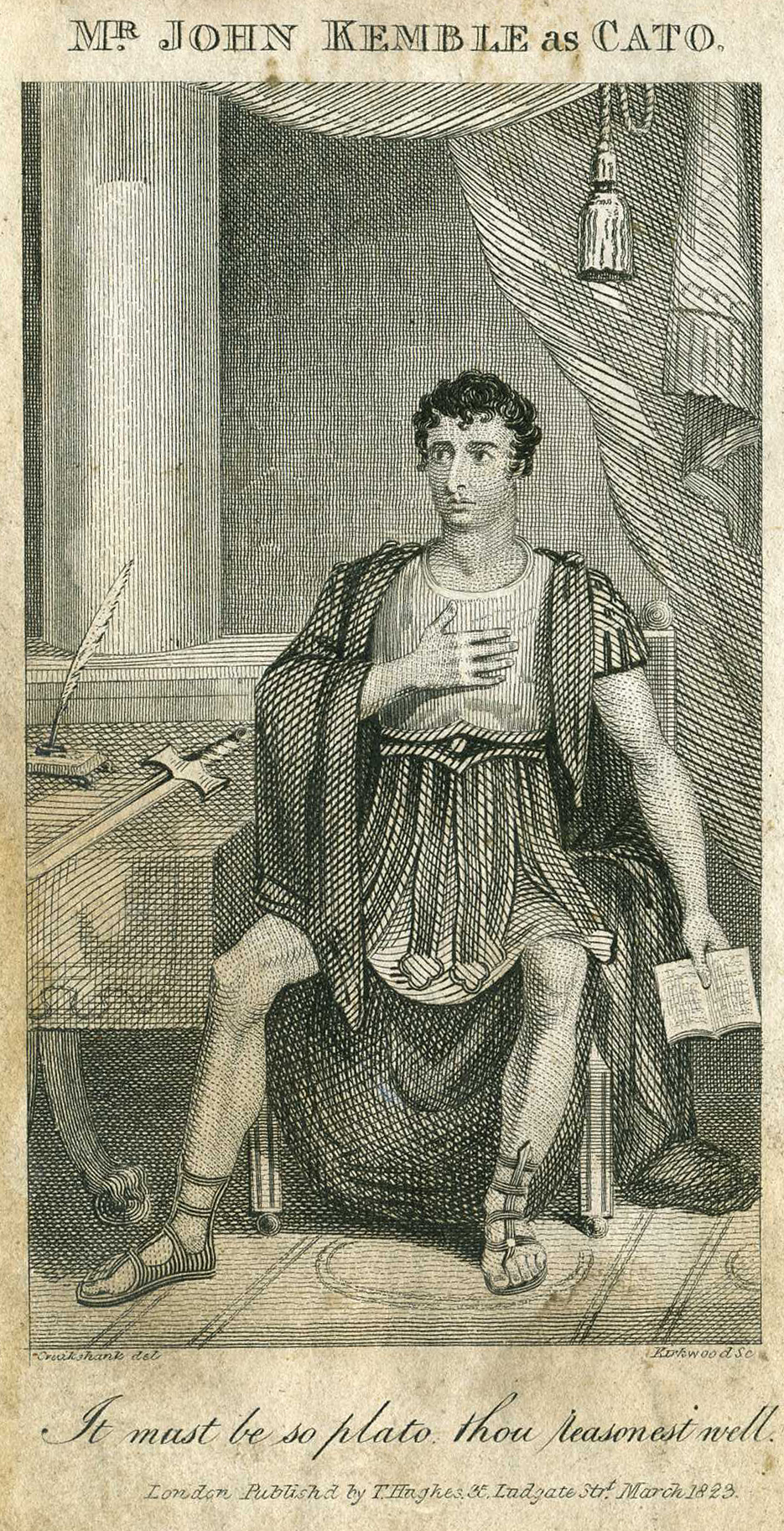
The actor John Kemble, in the role of Cato, revived at Covent Garden in 1816, drawn by George Cruikshank

In 1712, Addison wrote his most famous work, Cato, a Tragedy. Based on the last days of Marcus Porcius Cato Uticensis, it deals with conflicts such as individual liberty versus government tyranny, Republicanism versus Monarchism, logic versus emotion, and Cato's personal struggle to retain his beliefs in the face of death. It has a prologue written by Alexander Pope and an epilogue by Samuel Garth.

The play was a success throughout the British Empire. It continued to grow in popularity, especially in America, for several generations. It is cited by some historians as a literary inspiration for the American Revolution, being known to many of the Founding Fathers. General George Washington sponsored a performance of Cato for the Continental Army during the difficult winter of 1777–78 at Valley Forge. According to John J. Miller, "no single work of literature may have been more important than Cato" for the leaders of the American revolution.

Scholars have identified the inspiration for several famous quotations from the American Revolution in Cato. These include:

- Patrick Henry's famous ultimatum: "Give me liberty or give me death!"

(Supposed reference to Act II, Scene 4: "It is not now time to talk of aught/But chains or conquest, liberty or death.").

- Nathan Hale's valediction: "I regret that I have but one life to give for my country."

(Supposed reference to Act IV, Scene 4: "What a pity it is/That we can die but once to serve our country.").

- Washington's praise for Benedict Arnold in a letter: "It is not in the power of any man to command success; but you have done more – you have deserved it."

(Clear reference to Act I, Scene 2: "'Tis not in mortals to command success; but we'll do more, Sempronius, we'll deserve it.").

The Lord My Pasture Shall Prepare

The Lord my pasture shall prepare,
And feed me with a shepherd’s care;
His presence shall my wants supply,
And guard me with a watchful eye;
My noonday walks he shall attend,
And all my midnight hours defend.

When in the sultry glebe I faint,
Or on the thirsty mountains pant,
To fertile vales and dewy meads,
My weary, wandering steps he leads,
Where peaceful rivers soft and slow
Amid the verdant landscape flow.

Though in the paths of death I tread,
With gloomy horrors overspread,
My steadfast heart shall fear no ill;
For thou, O Lord, art with me still:
Thy friendly crook shall give me aid,
And guide me through the dreadful shade.

Though in a bare and rugged way,
Through devious lonely wilds I stray,
Thy bounty shall my pains beguile;
The barren wilderness shall smile,
With sudden greens and herbage crowned,
And streams shall murmur all around.

— By Joseph Addison

In 1789, Edmund Burke quoted the play in a letter to Charles-Jean-François Depont entitled Reflections on the revolution in France, saying that the French people may yet be obliged to go through more changes and "to pass, as one of our poets says, 'through great varieties of untried being,'" before their state obtains its final form. The poet referred to is Addison and the passage quoted is from Cato (V.i. II): "Through what variety of untried being, through what new scenes and changes must we pass!"

Though the play has fallen from popularity and is now rarely performed, it was popular and often cited in the eighteenth century, with Cato being an example of republican virtue and liberty, for example in Cato's Letters (although there is no direct evidence of the play inspiring the titling of the letters).

The action of the play involves the forces of Cato at Utica, awaiting the attack of Caesar immediately following his victory at Thapsus (46 BC). The noble sons of Cato, Portius and Marcus, are both in love with Lucia, the daughter of Lucius, an ally of Cato. Juba, prince of Numidia, one of Cato's warriors, loves Cato's daughter Marcia. Meanwhile, Sempronius, a senator, and Syphax, a general of the Numidians, are conspiring secretly against Cato, hoping to prevent the Numidian army from supporting him. In the final act, Cato commits suicide, leaving his followers to make their peace with the approaching army of Caesar – an easier task after Cato's death, since he was Caesar's most implacable enemy.

=== Hymns ===
Addison wrote the popular church hymn "The Spacious Firmament on High", publishing it in The Spectator in 1712. It is commonly sung either to the tune known as "LONDON (Addison's)" by John Sheeles, written c. 1720, or to "CREATION" by Joseph Haydn, 1798. He also produced a version of Psalm 23, "The Lord my pasture shall prepare", usually sung to the tune SURREY.

== Marriage and death ==
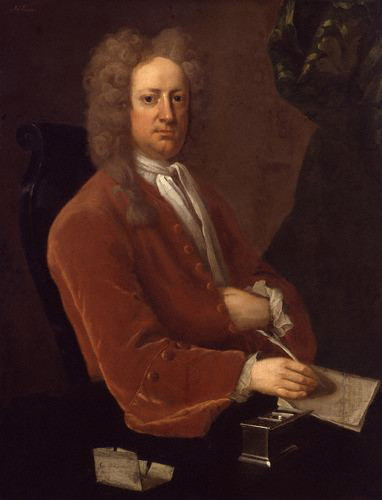
Addison in 1719, the year he died

The later part of Addison's life was not without its troubles. In 1716, he married Charlotte, Dowager Countess of Warwick, after working for a time as a tutor for her son. He then lived at Bilton Hall in Warwickshire. His political career continued, and he served as Secretary of State for the Southern Department from 1717 to 1718. His political newspaper The Freeholder was much criticised. His wife was arrogant and imperious; his stepson, Edward Rich, was an unfriendly rake. Addison's shyness in public limited his effectiveness as a member of Parliament. He eventually fell out with Steele over the Peerage Bill.

In 1718, Addison was forced to resign as Secretary of State because of his poor health, but he remained an MP until his death at Holland House, London, on 17 June 1719 (aged 47). He was buried in Westminster Abbey. After his death, an apocryphal story circulated that Addison, on his deathbed, had sent for his wastrel stepson to witness how a Christian man meets death.

On 6 April 1808, Middletown, a town in upstate New York, was renamed Addison in his honour. Addison Road in West Kensington was also named after him.

== Contribution ==
It is as an essayist that Addison is remembered today. He began writing essays quite casually. In April 1709, his childhood friend Richard Steele started the Tatler. Addison contributed 42 essays to the Tatler, while Steele wrote 188. Regarding Addison's help, Steele remarked, "when I had once called him in, I could not subsist without dependence on him". The Tatler was discontinued on 2 January 1711. The Spectator began publication on 1 March of that year, and it continued – being issued daily, and achieving great popularity – until 6 December 1712. It exercised an influence over the reading public of the time, and Addison soon became the leading partner in it, contributing 274 essays out of a total of 635; Steele wrote 236. Addison also assisted Steele with The Guardian, which began in 1713. Addison is the originator of the quote, "Reading is to the mind what exercise is to the body". The quote can be found in Issue 147 of the Tatler.

The breezy, conversational style of the essays later prompted Bishop Richard Hurd to reprove Addison for what he called an "Addisonian Termination", or preposition stranding, a grammatical construction that ends a sentence with a preposition. Alexander Pope in his 1735 Epistle to Dr Arbuthnot made Addison an object of derision, naming him "Atticus", and comparing him to an adder, "willing to wound, and yet afraid to strike".

He wrote an essay entitled Dialogues on Medals which was translated into French by eighteenth-century priest and journalist Simon-Jérôme Bourlet de Vauxcelles (1733–1802). His essay "Adventures of a Shilling" (1710) is a brief, early example of an it-narrative or object narrative, a genre that would become more common later in the century. He also left an incomplete work, Of the Christian Religion.

== Timeline ==
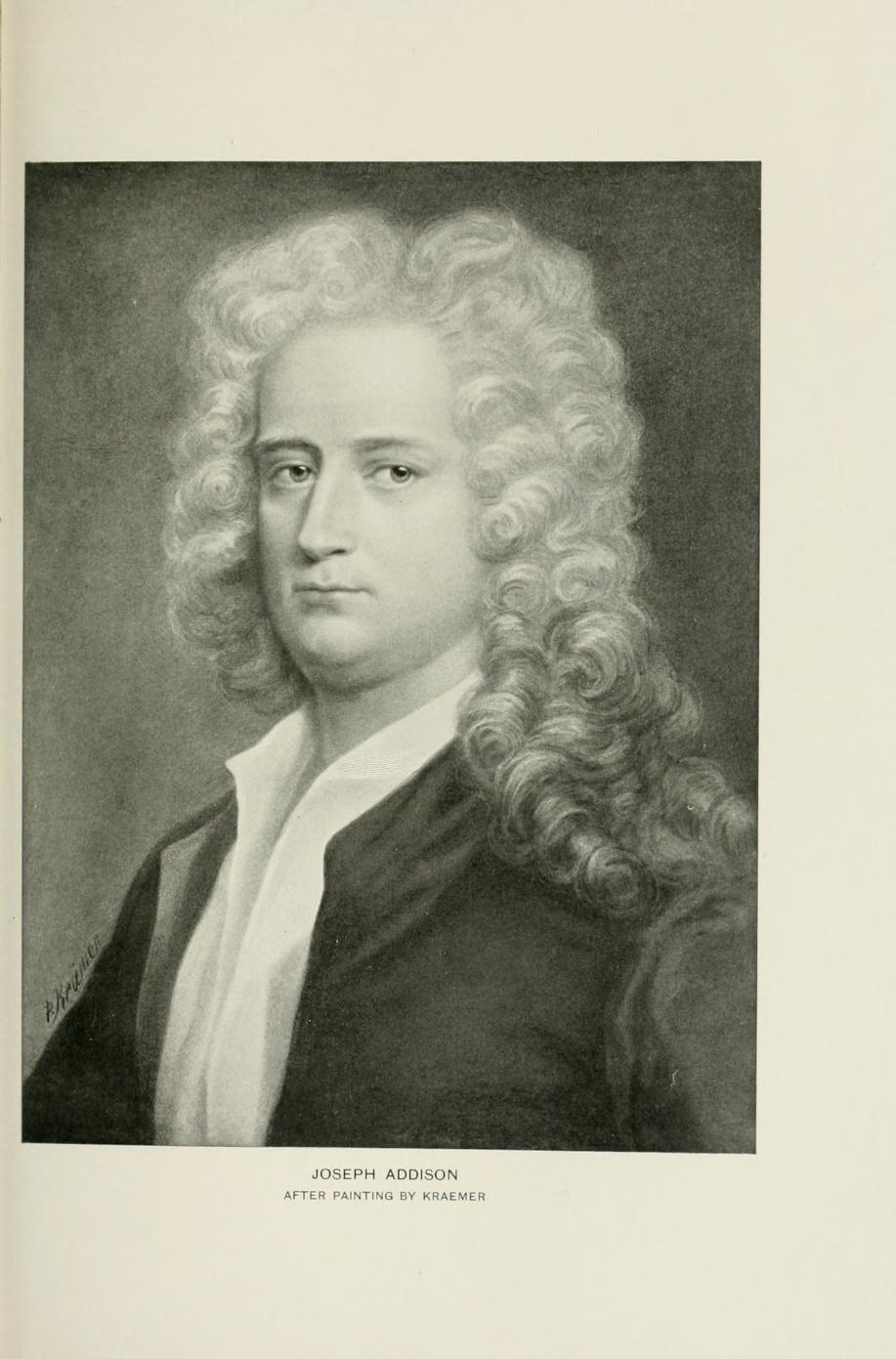
Addison, by Kraemer

== Albin Schram letters ==
In 2005, an Austrian banker and collector named Albin Schram died, and in a file cabinet next to his laundry room a collection of a thousand letters was found, some of them of interest to historians. Two of them were written by Joseph Addison.

The first reported on a debate in the House of Commons about a grant to John Churchill, 1st Duke of Marlborough, and his heirs, following the Battle of Ramillies. The letter was written on the day of the debate, probably to George Stepney.

Addison explains that the motion was opposed by Misters Annesley, Ward, Casar, and Sir William Vevian.

One said that this was showing no honour to His Grace but to a posterity that he was not concern'd in. Casar ... hoped ye Duke tho he had ben Victorious over the Enemy would not think of being so over a House of Commons: wch was said in pursuance to a Motion made by some of the Craftier sort that would not oppose the proposition directly but turn it off by a Side-Wind pretending that it being a money affaire it should be refer'd to a Committee of the whole House wch in all probability would have defeated the whole affaire....

Following the Duke of Marlborough's successful campaign of 1706, the Duke and George Stepney became the first English regents of the Anglo-Dutch condominium for governing the southern Netherlands. It was Stepney who formally took possession of the principality of Mindelheim in the Duke's name on 26 May, after the Battle of Ramillies. Upon Marlborough's return to London in November, Parliament accepted the Duke's request that a grant of £5,000 'out of ye Post-Office' be made in perpetuity to his heirs.

A second letter, written to Richard Steele, was also found, concerning the Tatler and other matters.

I very much liked your last paper upon the Courtship that is usually paid to the fair sex. I wish you had reserved the Letter in this days paper concerning Indecencies at Church for an entire piece. It wd have made as good a one as any you have published. Your Reflections upon Almanza are very good.

The letter concludes with references to impeachment proceedings against Addison's friend Henry Sacheverell ("I am much obliged to you for yor Letters relating to Sackeverell"), and the Light House petition:

I am something troubled that you have not sent away ye Letters received from Ireland to my Lord Lieutenant, particularly that from Mr Forster [the Attorney General] with the Enclosed petition about the Light House, which I hope will be delivered to the House before my Return.

== Analysis ==
Addison's character has been described as kind and magnanimous, albeit somewhat cool and unimpassioned, with a tendency for convivial excess. His appealing manners and conversation contributed to his general popularity. He often put his friends under obligations for substantial favours, but he showed great forbearance toward his few enemies. His essays are noted for their clarity and elegant style, as well as their cheerful and respectful humour.

Lord Macaulay wrote this generous tribute to Addison, which was published in 1866, seven years after Macaulay's death in 1859:

As a man, he may not have deserved the adoration which he received from those who, bewitched by his fascinating society, and indebted for all the comforts of life to his generous and delicate friendship, worshiped him nightly, in his favourite temple at Button's. But, after full inquiry and impartial reflection, we have long been convinced that he deserved as much love and esteem as can be justly claimed by any of our infirm and erring race. Some blemishes may undoubtedly be detected in his character; but the more carefully it is examined, the more it will appear, to use the phrase of the old anatomists, sound in the noble parts, free from all taint of perfidy, of cowardice, of cruelty, of ingratitude, of envy. Men may easily be named, in whom some particular good disposition has been more conspicuous than in Addison. But the just harmony of qualities, the exact temper between the stern and the humane virtues, the habitual observance of every law, not only of moral rectitude, but of moral grace and dignity, distinguish him from all men who have been tried by equally strong temptations, and about whose conduct we possess equally full information."

== See also ==
- Addison's Walk

Political offices
Preceded by George Dodington	Chief Secretary for Ireland; 1708–1710	Succeeded by Edward Southwell
Preceded by Sir John Stanley	Chief Secretary for Ireland; 1714–1715	Succeeded by Martin Bladen; Charles Delafaye
Preceded by Paul Methuen	Secretary of State for the Southern Department; 1717–1718	Succeeded by James Craggs the Younger
Parliament of Great Britain
Preceded by Russell Robartes; James Kendall	Member of Parliament for Lostwithiel; 1708–1709; With: James Kendall	Succeeded by Francis Robartes; Russell Robartes
Preceded by Thomas Farrington; Henry Mordaunt	Member of Parliament for Malmesbury; 1710–1719; With: Thomas Farrington 1710–1713; Sir John Rushout, Bt 1713–1719	Succeeded by Sir John Rushout, Bt; Fleetwood Dormer
Parliament of Ireland
Preceded by Thomas Ashe; Robert Saunders	Member of Parliament for Cavan Borough; 1709–1713; With: Thomas Ashe	Succeeded by Charles Lambart; Theophilus Clements
