= Nine Mile River, Wiltshire =

River in Wiltshire, England

Nine Mile River
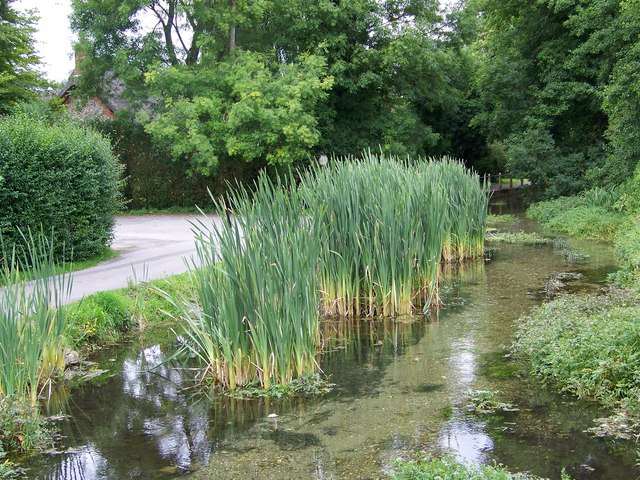
- Nine Mile River in Bulford

Location
- Country: United Kingdom
- Region: Wiltshire

Physical characteristics
- Source
  - location: near Milston, Wiltshire
  - coordinates: 51°12′22″N 1°46′08″W
- Mouth
  - location: Bulford, Wiltshire
  - coordinates: 51°11′20″N 1°45′36″W
- Length: 7.24 km (4.5 miles)

Basin features
- Tributaries
  - right: Damson Brook

Nine Mile River is a chalk stream in Wiltshire, England. The river is not nine miles long, it is actually half that, being 7.24 km (4.5 miles) in length. Its name arose because carters reckoned they were nine miles from Salisbury when they reached it. The river rises in the civil parish of Milston and joins the River Avon in the village of Bulford. At about halfway through its course, still in the parish of Milston, it is joined by the small Damson Brook.
