= Gulston Addison =

Indian politician (1673–1709)

President of Fort St George (Madras)
- In office 18 September 1709 – 17 October 1709
- Preceded by: Thomas Pitt
- Succeeded by: Edmund Montague

Personal details
- Born: 1673
- Died: 17 October 1709 (aged 35–36)
- Father: Lancelot Addison
- Relatives: Joseph Addison (brother)

Gulston Addison (1673 – 17 October 1709) was the President of Madras, India from 18 September 1709 to 17 October 1709. He was the younger brother of the famous essayist Joseph Addison, and the second son of Rev. Lancelot Addison.

== Early life ==
Gulston Addison was the second son of Rev. Lancelot Addison (1632–1703) and Jane Gulston (1635–1684). Lancelot Addison and Jane Gulston had five children: the English essayist Joseph Addison being the eldest. Gulston's other siblings were Dorothy Addison (1674–1750), Anne Addison (born 1676-?) and Lancelot Addison (1680–1710). Gulston completed his studies in England before entering politics. He was appointed Under Secretary of State under Sir Charles Hedges in 1706. In December 1708, he was appointed Secretary to Lord Wharton, the Lord-Lieutenant of Ireland.

== Tenure as President of Madras ==
Gulston Addison became President of Madras on 18 September 1709 on the sudden removal of Thomas Pitt following an accusation of corruption brought against him; however he was President for barely a month during which he attended around five consultations, in the last one of which, he instructed the captain of the ship "Heathcote" to treat Thomas Pitt with due respect and courtesy. Immediately afterwards he died. Fraser, the Deputy Governor of Fort St David was appointed Acting President and Edmund Montague, the Deputy Governor was appointed President till he arrived.

Preceded by Thomas Pitt	President of Madras; 18 September 1709 – 17 October 1709	Succeeded by Edmund Montague
