= Lancelot Addison =

English writer and clergyman (1632–1703)

Lancelot Addison (1632 – 20 April 1703) was an English writer and Church of England clergyman. He was born at Crosby Ravensworth in Westmorland. He was educated at the Queen's College, Oxford.

Addison worked at Tangier as a chaplain for seven years and upon his return he wrote "West Barbary, or a Short Narrative of the Revolutions of the Kingdoms of Fez and Morocco", (1671).

In 1670 he was appointed royal chaplain or Chaplain in Ordinary to the King, shortly thereafter Rector of Milston, Wilts (from 1670 to 1681), and Prebendary in the Cathedral of Salisbury. In 1681 Milston Rectory burnt down. In 1683 he became Dean of Lichfield, and in 1684 Archdeacon of Coventry.

Among his other works was "The Present State of the Jews" (1675), a detailed study of the Jewish population of the Barbary Coast in the seventeenth century, their customs, and their religious behaviour. Scholars have pointed out that part of Addison's book simply repeats material found in the English translation of Johannes Buxtorf's work Synagoga Judaica: The Jewish Synagogue, or an Historical Narration of the State of the Jewes (London, 1657).

He died in 1703 leaving three sons, the essayist Joseph Addison (1672–1719, eldest child), Gulston Addison, who became Governor of Madras, and the scholar Lancelot Addison (1680–1710), and two daughters: Dorothy Addison (1674–1750) and Anne Addison (1676-Unknown).

Addison was buried in Lichfield Cathedral in Staffordshire.
