= Thomas Farrington (British Army officer) =

British army officer and politician (1664–1712)

Lieutenant-General Thomas Farrington
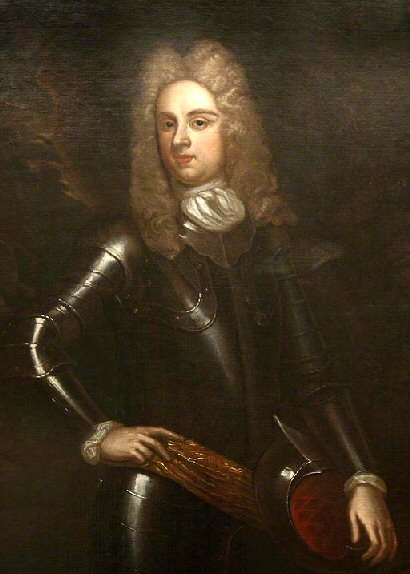
- Portrait of Farrington
- Born: 1664
- Died: 7 October 1712 (aged 47–48)
- Military career
- Allegiance: England; Great Britain
- Branch: English Army; British Army
- Service years: 1688–1712
- Rank: Lieutenant-general
- Unit: 2nd Regiment of Foot Guards
- Commands: Thomas Farrington's Regiment of Foot

Lieutenant-General Thomas Farrington (1664 – 7 October 1712) was a British army officer and politician who represented Malmesbury in the English and British House of Commons from 1705 to 1712. He raised the 29th (Worcestershire) Regiment of Foot.

== Early life ==
Farrington was the only son of Thomas Farrington of St Andrew Undershaft, London and Chislehurst, and his wife Mary Smith, daughter of John Smith of St Mary Aldermanbury, London and South Tidworth, Hampshire. He married by licence dated 16 August 1687 (with £3,000), Theodosia Bettenson, daughter of Richard Bettenson son of Sir Richard Bettenson, 1st Baronet, of Wimbledon, Surrey and Scadbury Park, Chislehurst. He succeeded his father in 1694.

== Military career ==
Farrington was commissioned into the English Army's 2nd Regiment of Foot Guards at the rank of captain on 31 December 1688. He raised what would become the 29th (Worcestershire) Regiment of Foot in 1694.

== Later career ==
Farrington was returned as Member of Parliament for Malmesbury at the 1705 English general election and was returned again at the 1708 British general election and at the 1710 British general election. He did not stand at the 1713 election. He was later promoted to major-general. Farrington died on 7 October 1712.

Parliament of England
Preceded by Thomas Boucher; Edward Pauncefort	Member of Parliament for Malmesbury; 1705–1707; With: Henry Mordaunt	Succeeded by Parliament of Great Britain
Parliament of Great Britain
Preceded by Parliament of England	Member of Parliament for Malmesbury; 1707–1713; With: Henry Mordaunt 1707–1710; Joseph Addison 1710–1713	Succeeded by Sir John Rushout, Bt; Joseph Addison
