= Baiza Bai =

- Maharani of Gwalior
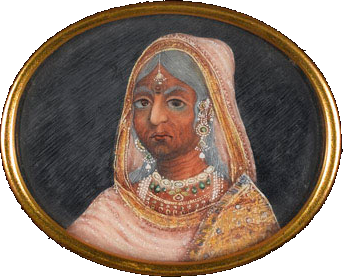
- A miniature portrait of Baiza Bai, watercolour on ivory, c. 1857.

Regent of Gwalior
- Tenure: March 1827 — 1833
- Maharaja: Jankoji Rao Scindia II
- Born: 1784; Kagal, Kolhapur State, Maratha Confederacy (modern-day Maharashtra, India)
- Died: 1863 (aged 78–79); Gwalior, Gwalior state, British Raj (modern-day Madhya Pradesh, India)
- Spouse: Daulat Rao Scindia
- House: Deshmukh (by birth); Scindia (by marriage)
- Father: Sarjerao Sakharam Ghatge
- Mother: Sunderabai
- Religion: Hinduism

Baiza Bai (also known as Baza Bai and Baeza Byee; 1784–1863) was one of the wives of Daulat Rao Scindia, the ruler of Gwalior princely state in India, and served as regent after his death.

The third wife of Daulat Rao, she acceded to the regency of the Scindia kingdom following his death and ruled 1827–1833. As a prominent opponent of the East India Company, she was eventually ousted from power and replaced on the throne by her adopted son Jankoji Rao Scindia II.

== Biography ==
=== Early life ===
Baiza Bai was born in Kagal in 1784. Her parents were Sunderabai and Sakharam Ghatge (1750–1809), Sarjerao Deshmukh of Kagal, a member of the nobility under the Bhonsle rulers of Kolhapur. In February 1798 in Poona, at the age of 14, she was married to Daulat Rao Scindia, the ruler of Gwalior, and became his favourite wife. Baiza Bai and Daulat Rao had several children, including a son who predeceased them.

She was known as a horsewoman, and had been trained to fight with a sword and spear. She accompanied her husband during the Maratha wars with the British, and she fought against Arthur Wellesley, the future Duke of Wellington, at the Battle of Assaye.

Scindia looked to Baiza Bai for help in administrative and state matters. There is an account of her opposition to the Scindia annexation of Udaipur on the grounds that the chief Rajput state should not be destroyed.

She obtained high positions for her relatives in the Scindia court. Sakharam was made Dewan of Gwalior. He was reported to have held anti-British sentiments, which led to trouble between him and his king. Following the Scindia defeat in the Second Anglo-Maratha War, a treaty signed with the East India Company explicitly excluded him from any governing role in Gwalior. Under the terms of the same treaty, Baiza Bai was granted a jagir of 200,000 rupees annually. However, it is reported that her husband appropriated these funds. In 1813, her brother Hindurao Jaisinghrao Ghatge was made Dewan of Gwalior, and in 1816, her uncle Babaji Patankar was offered the post.

Baiza Bai appears to have adopted her father's anti-British stance in her younger days. During the British campaign against the Pindaris, she had urged her husband to support the Peshwa Baji Rao II against them. When Daulat Rao submitted to British demands, she even left him briefly, accusing him of cowardice. She was also fiercely opposed to the Scindia surrender of Ajmer to the British.

By 1809, Sarjerao Sakharam Ghatge had managed to insinuate himself back into the circles of power within the court though he remained unpopular. He had several rivals, including Deoba Gawali, the Subahdar of Gwalior. In 1809, Sakharam Ghatge was murdered following a physical altercation he had with Daulat Rao. Baiza Bai suspected Gawali of instigating the crime, and under her influence, Daulat Rao dismissed him from his position. He was assassinated in 1812.

=== Banker ===
==== Background ====
By the time the mercantile East India Company became the paramount power in India, they had also become active competitors against native Indian merchant bankers. Because of their interests in the areas of revenue collection, the Indian merchant bankers had established alliances with the princely states. As the company's encroachment into their erstwhile spheres of influence became onerous, their political machinations began to pervade the Scindia court as well. Knowing full well they could not take on the company on their own, they needed the support of the Maratha kingdoms.

While their connection to the land and the armies allowed them to mobilise resistance against British penetration, these merchant bankers were also able to support local business groups and establish trade links, particularly in opium, that undermined the company's monopolies.

==== Financier ====
Large fortunes were made, especially by two Scindia financiers, Mani Ram and Gokul Parakh. Baiza Bai was able to keep the former's political manoeuvring in check, but she was also heavily invested in their firms. In the 1810s, she herself was a large-scale financier in her own right. She was involved in money-lending, bills of exchange, and speculation, all of which made her immensely wealthy. Furthermore, Ujjain, which was the centre of central Indian finance and commerce in the first half of the 1800s, was firmly under her control.

In Ujjain, Baiza Bai was the head of two banking firms: Nathji Kishan Das and Nathji Bhagwan Das. There is correspondence between her and the governor general complaining about the British seizure of her banking house in Benaras, which would result in "the name of the firm [being] lost".

As Baiza Bai was not seen to be amenable to British control, the East India Company thought to obtain a large loan from her in return for a tacit understanding of her Regency for life. In 1827, they requested 10,000,000 rupees, of which she lent 8 million. The company had hoped she might write off the loan, but she insisted that the principal and interest were repayable to her personally. The Company sought to raise the funds from Mani Ram, but he refused under pressure from Baiza Bai to extend any further credit. The competition in the opium trade from Central India had already badly affected the British; now their military and commercial operations in the territories began to suffer. Eventually, they paid off the loan to Baiza Bai. Cleverly, she managed to get the funds deposited in her bank in Benaras.

To fund the company's campaign in Burma, the British tried another time to obtain a loan from her. She anticipated them by putting in a request for a million rupees from Major Stewart, the Resident. This tactic appears to have persuaded the British that she was indeed impoverished.

=== Regency ===
On 21 March 1827, Daulat Rao Scindia died. He had left no plans for succession. However, he did advise the British Resident in his court, Major Josiah Stewart, that he wanted Baiza Bai to rule as regent. Shortly thereafter, Baiza Bai's brother, Hindu Rao, presented an unsigned document purporting to be Daulat Rao's will. In this, Daulat Rao declared his intention to adopt a son to rule as his successor. Hindu Rao was appointed as an executor of the 'will'. But there remained doubts as to its genuineness.

While Baiza Bai's regency was undisputed, it was imperative that a successor to the Scindia kingdom be appointed. There is some evidence that Baiza Bai and her brother wanted to select this successor. Their first choice was someone from her maternal family. On the advice of the royal priest, this choice was set aside; the successor had to be from Daulat Rao's side of the family. On 17 June 1827, an eleven-year-old boy called Mukut Rao from the Scindia family, was adopted as heir to the throne, and given the royal name Jankoji Rao Scindia.

Baiza Bai intended to keep the rule of the Scindia kingdom in her hands. There is some evidence that she attempted to keep Jankoji reined in by marrying him off to her granddaughter; though the (child) marriage took place, the granddaughter died. She then tried to persuade the British that her married daughter's unborn child might become the Scindia heir. The British government rejected the argument on the basis that the Scindia court and the military had both accepted Jankoji's adoption.

In 1830 she informed the Resident that supporters of Jankoji were scheming to overthrow her. She requested his permission to confiscate their property and exile them. She also requested that her regency be allowed to continue. The Resident forwarded the message to the Governor General's office, which refused to interfere in the internal matters of an independent state.

When Jankoji attained majority, Baiza Bai was demoted to Queen Mother (Rajmata). Displeased by this, her relationship with Jankoji began to deteriorate. She had restricted his education as he grew up; now, she refused to add his name to the state seal and restricted his freedom. Other than insisting that Jankoji's seal should always be used in official communications, the British did not interfere. Baiza Bai went on to claim that he was incapable of rule. Worried for his safety, Jankoji escaped to the Residency. The Resident declined to intervene.

In December 1832, the Governor General, Lord William Bentinck, arrived in Gwalior. Jankoji met him to demand that the kingship be given to him; in return, he promised to hand over a quarter of his income to Bentinck. The Governor General was upset by the attempted bribery, whereupon Jankoji asked if there would be any British objections should he order his guns to be fired on Baiza Bai. Bentinck was amused but he did object. While Bentinck informed Baiza Bai that the British would support Jankoji's claim to the throne of Gwalior, Jankoji attempted to instigate a military coup against her. He intended the revolt to occur on the last day of Muharram, as the tazias were taken into the mosque. Baiza Bai found out about the plot and scuppered it by ordering the tazias to be organised before dawn, at which time the conspirators were asleep.

There are varying opinions on Baiza Bai's regency. A "sophisticated and ruthless businesswoman", she didn't pay her troops for long periods, forcing them to borrow funds from a bank she held. Yet according to other accounts, she was a capable, efficient administrator, and paid her troops on time. She collaborated with the British in the suppression of Thuggee, and banned female infanticide.

By 1832, with the help of her able minister Raoji Trimbak, she had managed to establish state control over finances. This entailed delicate manoeuvring with the military and the revenue farmers. When Trimbak died, she continued the policy but began to alienate some of the powers in court. Her pursuit of merchant bankers in particular began to backfire as they rallied around Jankoji in opposition to her.

By 1834, Baiza Bai had lost the support of the Scindia army and many members of the administration. By this time, the East India Company had changed its earliest stance of non-interference in Gwalior's state affairs. They actively supported Jankoji. The new Resident, Mark Cavendish, was opposed to Baiza Bai. On Bentinck's orders, he encouraged Jankoji to overthrow her. She and her palace attendants fled to the Residency, where Cavendish treated her badly, refusing her entry into the building and allowing her only to pitch tents in his gardens. She and her party were drenched under monsoon showers; after they abated, Cavendish insisted on her leaving immediately on exile.

Facing ruin, Baiza Bai fled to Agra. Her brother, Hindu Rao, gave up any further interest in Scindia politics and settled in Delhi.

=== Later life ===
Even within British spheres, there was much discontent at the deposition of Baiza Bai. The Agra Moffussil Akhbar, a newspaper run in Agra by a Company army-man, considered Jankoji a usurper, and carried attacks against Cavendish for having supported him. Despite some factions in favour of Baiza Bai, it was clear that she would not be reinstated to power. The next fifteen years of her life were spent trying to establish a residence: she moved to Mathura and Fatehgarh, but was urged by the British to move to Benares. She refused to do so, but did stay in Allahabad for a period.

During her regency, Baiza Bai had amassed a considerable fortune, which she banked at Benares. She managed to maintain control over the treasure she took with her during her flight from Gwalior.

1835 found Baiza Bai in Fatihgarh, where she met Fanny Parkes, a Welsh travel-writer. The women bonded over horsemanship when the Bai mocked the English style of side-saddle riding. She challenged Parkes to ride in the usual way whereupon Parkes endeared herself to the Rani by riding in Mahratta style in Maratha costume. Parkes recounted how Baiza Bai's ambitions were stymied by the British as well as the Indians in her coterie. When the British issued an ultimatum to Baiza Bai to move to Benares on a pension, she asked Parkes for advice, which, much to her regret, Parkes was unable to offer. Parkes also reported how the Bai was forcibly moved from camp to camp, while her monies were often confiscated under duress.

In 1841, she moved to Nasik, where she earned an annual pension of 400,000 rupees from the British government. The British remained suspicious of her, especially when a rebellion near Poona was uncovered. There were allegations that she had either provided cover for couriers around the Deccan or funded military expenses. There was sufficient anxiety on the part of the British as to her involvement for the governor general to write to her 'warning her of the necessity of the most guarded conduct on her part to prevent any further similar reports.' She denied the accusations but her name figured again when another revolt occurred in 1842 in Asirgarh. She managed to keep the British at bay, alternately indicating that she was a pious woman engaged in the worship of God and claiming that her income from the British was insufficient.

After Jankoji's death in 1843, Baiza Bai was able to marry her granddaughter Chimnabai to his successor Jayaji Rao Scindia. The new maharaja would then inherit her massive fortune, reputed to be several crores of rupees, but was thereby forced to deal with repayment of the various debts she owed the British. Among other terms of the deal, she was allowed to return to live in Scindia territory, while the city and district of Ujjain would be restored to her control.

Between 1847 and 1856, Baiza Bai was in Ujjain. She returned to Gwalior in 1856.

During the Indian Rebellion of 1857, British suspicions of Baiza Bai came to the fore again. Gwalior, among the major princely states, had not risen against the British, though Jayaji's army deserted him. When the rebels led by Tantia Tope and Rani Lakshmibai of Jhansi occupied Gwalior, Baiza Bai along with Jayaji looked for British protection. She was able to take the Scindia queens to safety to Narwar. It is known that the rebels respected her: Tantia Tope kept up a correspondence with her, urging her to take over the rule of Gwalior. To show good faith, Baiza Bai handed over the letters to the British. Clearly, she was able to walk a fine line to maintain a cordial relationship with her family, the rebels as well as the British.

Baiza Bai died in Gwalior in 1863.

== Legacy ==
There are several tangible remnants of Baiza Bai's philanthropy and support of the arts and religion. As a queen and dowager, she endowed temples and worship grounds across the Scindia domains as well as sacred sites in North India.

In Benares, Baiza Bai is said to have built the colonnade around the Gyanvapi well in 1828. In 1830, she also built a temple close to the south turret of the Sindhia Ghat, one of the grandest ghats on the riverfront.

Prior to Daulat Rao's transfer of the Scindia capital to Gwalior, the first city of the kingdom was Ujjain. During her charge of the city, in 1848, Baiza Bai built the Gopal Krishna temple there. It comprised two large towers situated on either side of a square structure topped by a dome. A statue of Baiza Bai appears to the side of a black idol of Krishna. She also built a temple on the Pishachavimochan ghat on the Shipra River, which was her own chhatri.

In 1850, a reservoir called the Baizataal was constructed within the grounds of the Moti Mahal palace at Gwalior under her name.

== Bibliography ==
=== Books and Journals ===
- Beveridge, Henry (1861). A Comprehensive History of India, Civil, Military, and Social, from the First Landing of the English to the Suppression of the Sepoy Revolt: Including an Outline of the Early History of Hindoostan, Volume III. London: Blackie and Son.
- Chaurasia, R.S. (2004). History of the Marathas. New Delhi: Atlantic. ISBN 81-269-0394-5.
- Dongray, Keshavrao Balwant (1935). In Touch with Ujjain. Gwalior: Alijah Darbar Press.
- Farooqui, Amar (1998). Smuggling as Subversion: Colonialism, Indian Merchants, and the Politics of Opium, 1790–1843. Oxford: Lexington Books. ISBN 0-7391-0886-7.
- Farooqui, Amar (2000). "From Baiza Bai to Lakshmi Bai: The Sindia State in the Early Nineteenth Century and the Roots of 1857". In Pati, Biswamoy (ed.). Issues in Modern Indian History: For Sumit Sarkar. Popular Prakashan. ISBN 81-7154-658-7.
- Farooqui, Amar (2011). Sindias and the Raj: Princely Gwalior c. 1800–1850. Delhi: Primus. ISBN 978-93-80607-08-5.
- Goel, Neeraj (2015). "An Empress of Gwalior State" (PDF). New Man International Journal of Multidisciplinary Studies. 2 (5). ISSN 2348-1390. Archived from the original (PDF) on February 10, 2018.
- Malleson, G.B. (1875). An Historical Sketch of the Native States of India in Subsidiary Alliance with the British Government. London: Longmans, Green & Co.
- Mount, Ferdinand (2015). Tears of the Rajas: Mutiny, Money and Marriage in India 1805–1905. Simon & Schuster. ISBN 978-1471129452.
- Murray, John (1911). A Handbook for Travellers in India, Burma and Ceylon. London.
- Rotaru, Julieta (2012). "Gaṇeśa Bhaṭta Dādā Gore, an Atharvavedin Revivalist of the 19th Century" (PDF). Biblioteca Bucureștilor. XV (1). Metropolitan Library of Bucharest. Archived from the original (PDF) on 2018-02-10.
- Sengupta, Nandini (2007). "The British Woman Traveller in India: Cultural Intimacy and Interracial Kinship in Fanny Parks's Wanderings of a Pilgrim in Search of the Picturesque". In Towheed, Shafquat (ed.). New Readings in the Literature of British India, c. 1780–1947. Stuttgart: ibidem. ISBN 978-3-8382-5673-3.
- Sherring, Matthew Atmore (1868). The Sacred City of the Hindus: An Account of Benares in Ancient and Modern Times. Trübner & Company.
- Struth, Elissa Vann (2001). Splitting the Stereotype: Reading Women in Colonial Texts (M.A. thesis). University of British Columbia.

=== Newspapers ===
- "Bombay Mails". Nottinghamshire Guardian. No. 922. 11 September 1863.
- "A Remarkable Character Deceased". The New York Times. 13 September 1863.
- "हरियाली की ओट में बैजाताल". Dainik Bhaskar (in Hindi). 15 August 2014.
