= Milston =

Hamlet in Wiltshire, England

Coordinates: 51.207°N 1.767°W

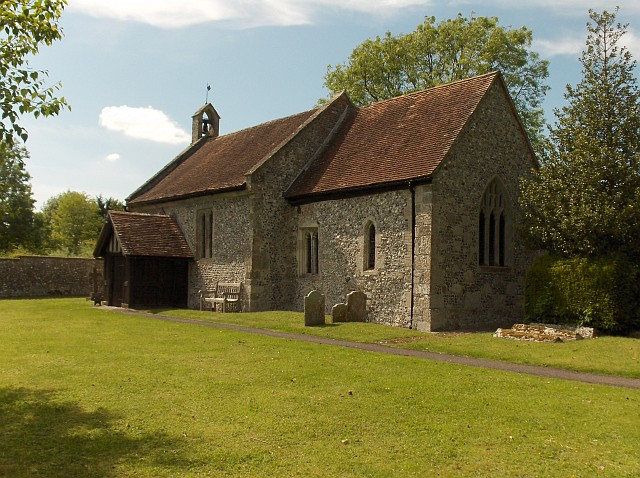
- St Mary's, Milston

- Location within Wiltshire
- Population: 130 (in 2011)
- OS grid reference: SU164453
- Civil parish: Milston
- Unitary authority: Wiltshire
- Ceremonial county: Wiltshire
- Region: South West
- Country: England
- Sovereign state: United Kingdom
- Post town: Salisbury
- Postcode district: SP4
- Dialling code: 01980
- Police: Wiltshire
- Fire: Dorset and Wiltshire
- Ambulance: South Western
- UK Parliament: East Wiltshire

Milston is a hamlet and civil parish in Wiltshire, England, about 10 miles (16 km) north of Salisbury and separated from Durrington by the River Avon. The parish covers two hamlets, Milston and Brigmerston, along with farm buildings on Salisbury Plain. The population in 2011 was 130 – the same as in 1861.

== Heritage ==
The name Milston derives from the Old English midlest tūn, meaning "middlemost farm/settlement". Milston Down Wood has earthworks including bowl barrows. The Nine Mile River rises on Brigmerston Down and is joined by the Damson Brook.

Milston hamlet contains a small Grade II* listed church dedicated to St Mary, erected in the 13th/14th centuries and restored in 1806 and 1906. The single bell in the bellcote dates from about 1209 and the font probably from the 13th century. It is one of seven Church of England parishes currently covered by the Avon River Team ministry.

The Old Manor House at Milston, dating from 1613, is a Grade II* listed building.

== Notable residents ==
Milston was the birthplace of the writer and politician Joseph Addison (1672–1719), whose father Lancelot Addison, writer and cleric, was Rector of Milston from 1670 to 1681, when the Rectory burnt down.
