= Edmund Montague =

British colonial administrator

President of Fort St George (Madras) (acting)
- In office 17 October 1709 – 18 November 1709
- Preceded by: Gulston Addison
- Succeeded by: William Fraser
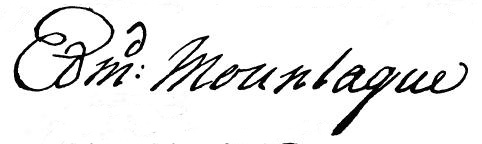
- Signature

Edmund Montague was the Acting Governor of Fort St George from 17 October 1709 to 18 November 1709.

== Tenure as President of Madras ==
On the death of Gulston Addison, the then President of Madras on 17 October 1709, William Fraser was appointed as the President of Madras. However, as Fraser was then the Governor of Fort St David, Edmund Montague was made Acting Governor of Fort St George for about a month. His tenure was devoid of events. The factors tried to persuade Captain Seaton back to England and failed. Fraser arrived in Madras on 2 November and addressed the Council of Fort St George on 3 November.

| Preceded by Gulston Addison | President of Madras; 17 October 1709 – 18 November 1709 | Succeeded by William Fraser |
