= Raja Hindu Rao =

Maratha Indian noble

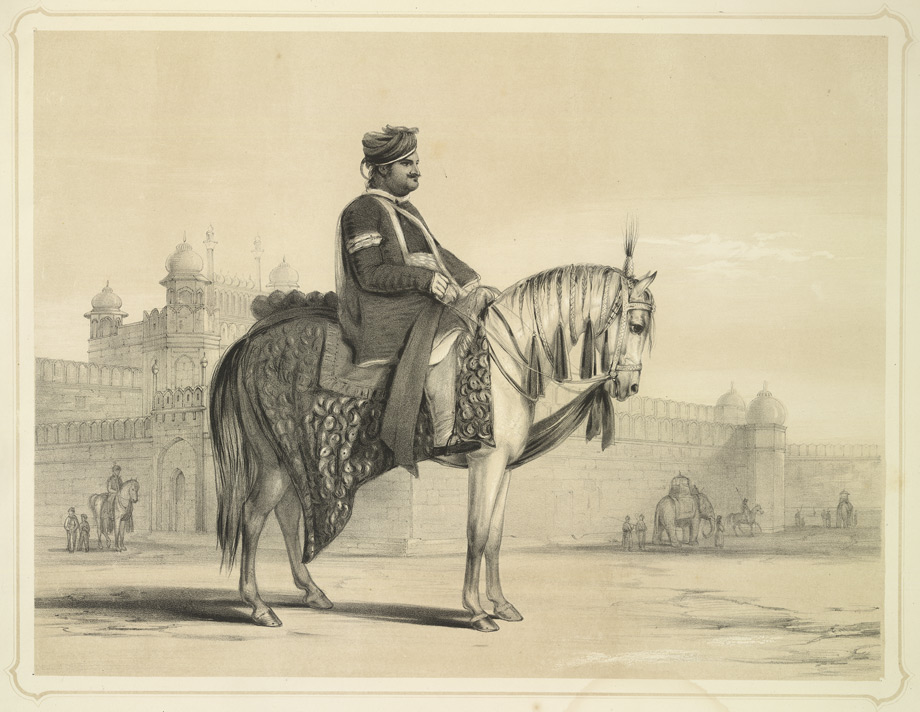
- Monarch: Daulatrao Sindhia

Personal details
- Relations: Sarjerao Sakharam Ghatge (father); Daulatrao Sindhia (brother in law); Baiza Bai (sister)

Military service
- Battles/wars: Indian Rebellion of 1857: Siege of Delhi (1857)

Raja Hindu Rao was a Maratha Indian nobleman. He was the brother-in-law of Maharaja Daulat Rao Scindia of Gwalior, and the brother of Baiza Bai, the regent of the Indian princely state of Gwalior. Following the Revolt of 1857, he shifted to Delhi where he was on friendly terms with the British Resident. According to Emily Eden, sister of the then Governor General of India, Lord Auckland:

"On a revolution at Gwaliar, he retired to Delhi, where he now principally resides, and where he is well known in European society, with which he is fond of Mixing. Hindoo Rao is a very constant attendant on the person of the Governor-General wherever he may be in the neighbourhood of Delhi; making a point, generally, of joining his suite and riding with him on his morning marches."

His residence was a scene of a major battle in Delhi during the Revolt of 1857 and has long since been converted into the Hindu Rao Hospital, a well known Government hospital in Malka Ganj, North Delhi.

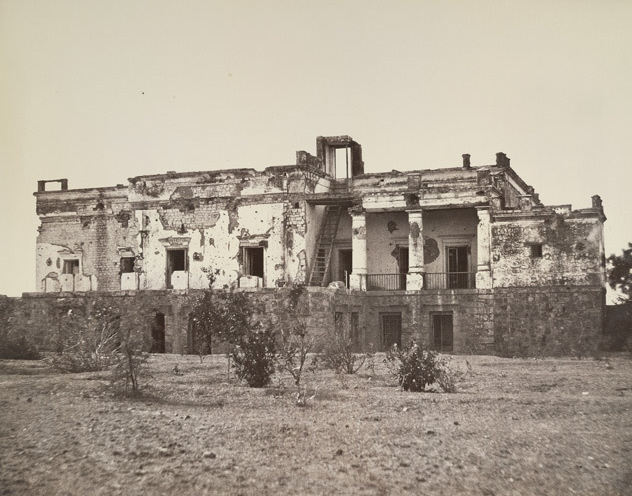
Hindu Rao's house in Delhi, was extensively damaged in the fighting in the Revolt of 1857

According to the book by John Lang, Wanderings in Hindostan written first hand where he befriended Hindu Rao and described his death and funeral, Hindu Rao died in Delhi BEFORE the 1857 mutiny in 1854. He was present at the funeral. There appears to be a clash of dates with Emily Eden.

== See also ==
- House of Scindia
- Gwalior State
- Maratha Empire
