= William Fraser (British administrator) =

British merchant and administrator

William Fraser (acting)

President of Fort St George (Madras)
- In office 18 November 1709 – 11 July 1711
- Preceded by: Edmund Montague
- Succeeded by: Edward Harrison
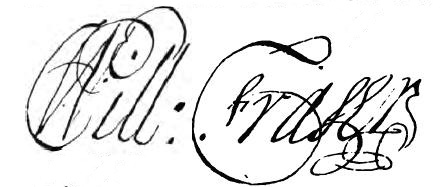
- Signature

William Fraser was a British merchant and administrator who was the Acting President of Madras from 14 November 1709 to 11 July 1711.

== Tenure as Acting President of Madras ==
=== Accusations against Armenians ===
On 13 January 1710, Lewis Melique, a European citizen of Madras presented a petition to Fraser accusing Khoja Safar, a prominent Armenian of St. Thomas Mount of sedition. Melique accused Khoja and other Armenians of St. Thomas Mount of conspiring to break away from Fort St George and establish their own independent factory with St. Thome as port. Khoja Safar on presented before Melique denied the accusations but despite Safar's insistence on his innocence, he was jailed on the condition that he would be released only on the provision of a security of 5,000 pagodas.

=== Relations with the Mughals ===
There existed a cordial relationship between the British at Fort St George and Zuddie Khan, the Mughal Foujdar of Bengal and Southern India with the frequent exchange of letters and gifts. However, the relationships with Nawab Dawood Khan and his successor Zulfikar Khan weren't so cordial. However, from April 1710, the Nawab under the suspected influence of Yavallappa, Manager of Poonamallee, began to pressurize the Company to hand over the Five Old Villages. Fraser wrote a letter to Zulfikar Khan reminding him that the Five Old Villages had been handed over to the British by the Mughal Emperor Aurangazeb in recognition of the services they had rendered to the Mughals during the siege of Gingee. But this petition was of nio avail as Zulfikar Khan simply sent out a Parwana restating his demands.

=== Siege of the Visakhapatnam factory ===
In 1698, two powerful Indians, Anantarao and Piccarao borrowed money from one Mr. Holcombe, the Deputy Governor of the English factory at Visakhapatnam and failed to repay him. Holcombe, who had borrowed 44,000 pagodas from Fakrullah Khan, the Nawab of Kalinga, in order to pay the two Indians was embroiled in a perilous situation. When the Nawab demanded his money, he was only able to pay him 37,500 pagodas. Soon, Holcombe died leaving behind a debt of 6,500 pagodas to Fakrullah Khan. Fakrullah Khan held the Company responsible and demanded a payment of the debt from the British factory at Visakhapatnam. Fakrullah Khan was also dissatisfied with the support lent by the Company to the former's rival to the throne Habib Khan.

On 8 August 1710, Fakrullah Khan besieged the Visakhapatnam factory with an army comprising 7,000 foot and 800 horse. By the next evening, the factory was effectively blockaded and supply lines cut. The factors at Madras intervened and proposed peace to Fakrullah Khan. The next year, peace was finally concluded through the mediation of Habib Khan.

=== Letter from the King of Pegu ===
On 24 February 1711, the King of Pegu wrote a letter to the Governor of Fort St George requesting the British to send him a clock and expressing his readiness to provide the British with anything they ask, in return.

However, it is not known whether Fraser did in the end send a clock.

Fraser was recalled suddenly on 11 July 1711 and replaced with Edward Harrison.

Preceded by Edmund Montague (acting)	President of Madras; 18 November 1709 – 11 July 1711	Succeeded by Edward Harrison
