= HMS Resolution (1705) =

Ship of the line of the Royal Navy

History

Great Britain
- Name: HMS Resolution
- Builder: Lee, Woolwich Dockyard
- Launched: 15 March 1705
- Fate: Run ashore, 1707

General characteristics
- Class & type: 70-gun third rate ship of the line
- Tons burthen: 1103
- Length: 150 ft 10 in (46.0 m) (gundeck)
- Beam: 40 ft 11 in (12.5 m)
- Depth of hold: 17 ft 1 in (5.2 m)
- Propulsion: Sails
- Sail plan: Full-rigged ship
- Armament: 70 guns of various weights of shot

HMS Resolution was a 70-gun third rate ship of the line of the Royal Navy, built at Woolwich Dockyard and launched on 15 March 1705.

Resolution was lost when she ran ashore in 1707.
