= List of colonial governors and presidents of the Madras Presidency =

This is a list of the governors, agents, and presidents of colonial Madras, initially of the East India Company, up to the end of British colonial rule in 1947.

== English Agents ==
In 1639, the grant of Madras to the English was finalized between the factors of the Masulipatnam (now Machilipatnam) factory (trading post), represented by Francis Day, and the Raja of Chandragiri. In 1640, Andrew Cogan, the chief of the Masulipatnam factory, made his way to Madras in the company of Francis Day and the English and Indian employees of the Masulipatnam factory. The Agency of Madras was established on 1 March 1640 and Cogan was made the first Agent. The official title was 'Governor of Fort St George' and the Governor was usually referred to as Agent. Cogan served in the post for three years and was succeeded by Francis Day. After four agents had served their terms, Madras was upgraded to a Presidency during the time of Aaron Baker. However financial considerations forced the company to revert to an agency soon after Aaron Baker had served his term. The Agency survived until 1684 when Madras was made a Presidency once and for all. Streynsham Master is the best remembered and most renowned of the Agents of Madras.

#	Name (birth–death)	Took office	Left office	Notes
Agents
1	Andrew Cogan	1 March 1640	1643	Construction of Fort St. George begins
2	Francis Day (1605–1673)	1643	1644	
3	Thomas Ivie (1605–1673)	1644	1648	Establishment of Government General Hospital
4	Thomas Greenhill (1611–1658)	1648	1652	
5	Aaron Baker (1610–1683)	1652	1655	
6	Thomas Greenhill (1611–1658)	1655	1658	
7	Sir Thomas Chambers (d. 1692)	1658	1661	
8	Sir Edward Winter (1622–1686)	1661	Aug 1665	
9	George Foxcroft (1634–1715)	Aug 1665	16 Sep 1665	
10	Sir Edward Winter (1622–1686)	16 Sep 1665	22 Aug 1668	
11	George Foxcroft (1634–1715)	22 Aug 1668	Jan 1670	Triplicane annexed by Madras
12	Sir William Langhorne, 1st Baronet (1631–1715)	Jan 1670	27 Jan 1678	
13	Streynsham Master (1640–1724)	27 Jan 1678	3 Jul 1681	Construction of St. Mary's Church and Kalikambal Temple
14	William Gyfford	3 Jul 1681	8 Aug 1684	

== Presidents ==
Madras was elevated to a presidency in 1684 and remained so until 12 February 1785 when new rules and regulations brought by the Pitt's India Act reformed the administration of the East India Company with the exception of a three-year period of French rule from 1746 to 1749 when Madras was a governorship.

Subsequently, Elihu Yale who took charge on 8 August 1684 was the First President of Madras. Elihu Yale, Thomas Pitt and George Macartney are some of the well-known Presidents of Madras.

Name	Took office	Left office
Elihu Yale (First term) (acting)	8 August 1684	26 January 1685
William Gyfford	26 January 1685	25 July 1687
Elihu Yale (Second term)	25 July 1687	3 October 1692
Nathaniel Higginson	3 October 1692	7 July 1698
Thomas Pitt	7 July 1698	18 September 1709
Gulston Addison	18 September 1709	17 October 1709
Edmund Montague (acting)	17 October 1709	14 November 1709
William Fraser	14 November 1709 (acting)	11 July 1711
Edward Harrison	11 July 1711	8 January 1717
Joseph Collett	8 January 1717	18 January 1720
Francis Hastings (acting)	18 January 1720	15 October 1721
Nathaniel Elwick	15 October 1721	15 January 1725
James Macrae	15 January 1725	14 May 1730
George Morton Pitt	14 May 1730	23 January 1735
Richard Benyon (governor)	23 January 1735	14 January 1744
Nicholas Morse	14 January 1744	10 September 1746

== Governors of the French East India Company ==
In 1746, Joseph François Dupleix's deputy, Mahé de La Bourdonnais laid siege to Madras and captured the city. For the next three years, Madras remained under French governors, until 1749, when Madras was handed to the British as per the Treaty of Aix-la-Chapelle (1748). The illustrious de la Bordannais served as acting governor for a few months until the appointment of Governor Jean-Jacques Duval d'Eprémesnil, who served until 1749 when Madras reverted to British rule.

Name	Took office	Left office
Mahé de La Bourdonnais (acting)	10 September 1746	2 October 1746
Jean-Jacques Duval d'Eprémesnil	2 October 1746	August 1749

== Presidents of the British East India Company ==
During the period between 1746 and 1749, when Madras was under French rule, the British ran a provisional government from Fort St. David, near modern-day Porto Novo. In 1752, when Madras had been returned to the British, the then President of Madras, John Saunders, shifted the seat of government from Fort St. David to Madras. The British gained a lot of territory during the mid-18th century, so that by the time the French military power was crushed at the Battle of Wandiwash in 1761, the territory under the Presidency of Madras had increased manyfold. In 1785, the Province of Madras was created and the President became the Governor of Madras.

Name	Took office	Left office
John Hinde (in Fort St. David)	10 September 1746	14 April 1747
Charles Floyer (in Fort St. David)	14 April 1747	19 September 1750
Thomas Saunders (in Fort St. David up to 5 April 1752)	19 September 1750	14 January 1755
George Pigot (1st time)	14 January 1755	14 November 1763
Robert Palk	14 November 1763	25 January 1767
Charles Bourchier	25 January 1767	31 January 1770
Josias Du Pré	31 January 1770	2 February 1773
Alexander Wynch	2 February 1773	11 December 1775
George Pigot (2nd time)	11 December 1775	23 August 1776
George Stratton	23 August 1776	31 August 1777
John Whitehill (first time) (acting)	31 August 1777	8 February 1778
Sir Thomas Rumbold	8 February 1778	6 April 1780
John Whitehill (second time) (acting)	6 April 1780	8 November 1780
Charles Smith (acting)	8 November 1780	22 June 1781
George Macartney	22 June 1781	12 February 1785

== Governors (of British India) ==
Name	Took office	Left office
George Macartney	12 February 1785	14 June 1785
Alexander Davidson (acting)	14 June 1785	6 April 1786
Sir Archibald Campbell	6 April 1786	7 February 1789
John Holland (acting)	7 February 1789	13 February 1790
Edward J.Holland (acting)	13 February 1790	20 February 1790
William Medows	20 February 1790	1 August 1792
Sir Charles Oakeley	1 August 1792	7 September 1794
Robert Hobart, Baron Hobart	7 September 1794	21 February 1798
George Harris (acting)	21 February 1798	21 August 1798
Edward Clive, 2nd Baron Clive	21 August 1798	30 August 1803
Lord William Bentinck	30 August 1803	11 September 1807
William Petrie (acting)	11 September 1807	24 February 1808
Sir George Barlow, 1st Baronet	24 February 1808	21 May 1813
John Abercromby (acting)	21 May 1813	16 September 1814
Hugh Elliot	16 September 1814	10 June 1820
Sir Thomas Munro	10 June 1820	10 July 1827
Henry Sullivan Graeme (acting)	10 July 1827	18 October 1827
Stephen Rumbold Lushington	18 October 1827	25 October 1832
Sir Frederick Adam	25 October 1832	4 March 1837
George Edward Russell (acting)	4 March 1837	6 March 1837
John Elphinstone, 13th Lord Elphinstone	6 March 1837	24 September 1842
George Hay, 8th Marquess of Tweeddale	24 September 1842	23 February 1848
Henry Dickinson (acting)	23 February 1848	7 April 1848
Sir Henry Pottinger	7 April 1848	24 April 1854
Daniel Eliott (acting)	24 April 1854	28 April 1854
George Harris, 3rd Baron Harris	28 April 1854	28 March 1859
Sir Charles Trevelyan	28 March 1859	8 June 1860
William Ambrose Morehead (1st time) (acting)	8 June 1860	5 July 1860
Sir Henry George Ward	5 July 1860	2 August 1860
William Ambrose Morehead (2nd time) (acting)	4 August 1860	18 February 1861
Sir William Denison (1st time)	18 February 1861	26 November 1863
Edward Maltby (acting)	26 November 1863	18 January 1864
Sir William Denison (2nd time)	18 January 1864	27 March 1866
Francis Napier	27 March 1866	19 February 1872
Alexander John Arbuthnot (acting)	19 February 1872	15 May 1872
Vere Henry Hobart, Baron Hobart	15 May 1872	29 April 1875
William Rose Robinson (acting)	29 April 1875	23 November 1875
Richard Temple-Nugent-Brydges-Chandos-Grenville, 3rd Duke of Buckingham and Chandos	23 November 1875	20 December 1880
William Patrick Adam	20 December 1880	24 May 1881
William Huddleston (acting)	24 May 1881	5 November 1881
Mountstuart Elphinstone Grant Duff	5 November 1881	8 December 1886
Robert Bourke, 1st Baron Connemara	8 December 1886	1 December 1890
John Henry Garstin	1 December 1890	23 January 1891
Beilby Lawley, 3rd Baron Wenlock	23 January 1891	18 March 1896
Sir Arthur Elibank Havelock	18 March 1896	28 December 1900
Arthur Russell, 2nd Baron Ampthill (1st time)	28 December 1900	30 April 1904
James Thompson (acting)	30 April 1904	13 December 1904
Arthur Russell, 2nd Baron Ampthill (2nd time)	13 December 1904	15 February 1906
Sir Gabriel Stokes (acting)	15 February 1906	28 March 1906
Sir Arthur Lawley	28 March 1906	3 November 1911
Sir Thomas David Gibson-Carmichael	3 November 1911	30 March 1912
Sir Murray Hammick (acting)	30 March 1912	30 October 1912
John Sinclair, 1st Baron Pentland	30 October 1912	29 March 1919
Sir Alexander Cardew	29 March 1919	10 April 1919
Freeman Freeman-Thomas, 1st Baron Willingdon	10 April 1919	12 April 1924
Sir Charles Todhunter (acting)	12 April 1924	14 April 1924
George Goschen, 2nd Viscount Goschen	14 April 1924	29 June 1929
Sir Norman Majoribanks (acting)	29 June 1929	11 November 1929
Sir George Frederick Stanley (1st time)	11 November 1929	16 May 1934
Sir Muhammad Usman Sahib Bahadur (acting)	16 May 1934	16 August 1934
Sir George Frederick Stanley (2nd time)	16 August 1934	15 November 1934
John Erskine, Lord Erskine (1st time)	15 November 1934	18 June 1936
Kurma Venkata Reddy Naidu (acting)	18 June 1936	1 October 1936
John Erskine, Lord Erskine (2nd time)	1 October 1936	12 March 1940
Arthur Hope	12 March 1940	26 February 1946
Sir Henry Foley Knight (acting)	26 February 1946	5 May 1946
Sir Archibald Nye	5 May 1946	15 August 1947
