= Governor Pitt =

Governor Pitt may refer to:

- George Morton Pitt (1693–1756), Governor of the Madras Presidency at Fort St. George from 1730 to 1735
- John Pitt (soldier) (1698–1754), Governor of Bermuda from 1728 to 1737
- John Pitt, 2nd Earl of Chatham (1756–1835), Governor of Plymouth from 1805 to 1807, Governor of Jersey from 1807 to 1821, and Governor of Gibraltar from 1820 to 1825
- Thomas Pitt (1653–1726), Governor of Jamaica from 1716 to 1717
- Thomas Pitt, 1st Earl of Londonderry (1668–1729), Governor of the Leeward Islands from 1728 to 1729
