= Walter Clavell =

English administrator for the East India Company

Chief of the factories in the Bay of Bengal
- In office June 1672 – 4 August 1677
- Preceded by: Henry Powell
- Succeeded by: Matthias Vincent

Personal details
- Born: 1639
- Died: 4 August 1677 (aged 37–38) Hooghly, Bengal Presidency

Walter Clavell (1639 – 4 August 1677) was an English administrator employed by the East India Company as Chief of the factories in the Bay of Bengal.

== Career ==
In 1667, at the age of 28, he was sent out by the Court of Directors of the East India Company to Fort St. George to assist in reinstating the imprisoned Governor, George Foxcroft. However, partly due to illness on his way overland from Surat, Clavell did not reach his destination until January 1669 when he found that the dispute between Foxcroft and Sir Edward Winter had already been resolved. He petitioned to go to the Bay of Bengal where he was appointed second in command, and, when Shem Bridges left for England, became acting 'Chief of the factories in the Bay of Bengal' a post in which he was confirmed by orders from the EIC in December 1672. In June 1672, Clavell procured a parwana (firman) from Shaista Khan, the Mughal governor of Bengal, which did little to stop the oppression of British trade by Khan and Malik Quasim, the Governor of Hooghly.

From 1672 to 1676 Clavell quarrelled with Joseph Hall, factor at Cossimbazar, who he accused of trading on his own account against the EIC's interests amongst a host of other charges.

Counter charges were made against Clavell including expropriation of property and the construction of "a Pallace" at Balasore. Major William Puckle of the EIC was sent to investigate and concluded that Clavell was guilty of "overrateing the Companys Goods 40 per Cent. great private Tradeing, &c and keeping the Generall Books himself contrary to the Companys Order."

In 1676 Clavell returned to Hooghly with Streynsham Master, recently appointed superintendent of the factories and at the latter's request wrote an Accompt of the Trade of Hughly and Ballasore.

On 4 August 1677, Clavell died of fever with his wife and infant child following the next day.

== Personal life ==
Clavell first married Prudence Lance, by whom he had one son, William, 1673–1680. She was the "affianced wife" of Walter Clavell and travelled out to India at the Hon. East India's expense. She died after her son was born. She died in 1673 in West Bengal, She was a "kinswoman" of Sir Matthew Holworthy, a wealthy City of London merchant. He left £1,000 to Harvard College. See: Wikipedia/Holworthy Hall/p

His second wife, Martha Woodroffe, 1650–1677 was the sister of the wife of Sir Edward Littleton by whom he had two sons. His second son, also Walter, was baptized in Cossimbazar on 29 September 1678. In 1681 Walter junior and his brother Edward left India for England aboard the East Indiaman President. Edward became High Sheriff of Dorset in 1702. Walter was elected FRS, 30 Nov 1704
