= William Langhorne =

William Langhorne may refer to:

- Sir William Langhorne, 1st Baronet (c. 1631–1715), colonial administrator in British India under the East India Company
- Will Langhorne, racing car driver
- William Langhorne, clergyman, who with his brother John Langhorne translated Plutarch's Lives
