= Thomas Greenhill =

Thomas Greenhill may refer to:

- Thomas Greenhill (colonial administrator)
- Thomas Greenhill (surgeon)
