= Underditch Hundred =

Hundreds of Wiltshire in 1832

Underditch Hundred was a judicial and taxation subdivision of the English county of Wiltshire that existed from the about the 8th century to the 19th century.

The hundred contained the parishes of Salisbury, Stratford-sub-Castle, Durnford, Woodford and Wilsford cum Lake.

It was named after the meeting place where the court was originally held, in Durnford, which was recorded in a mid-tenth-century charter as windryðe dic.

The hundred was held by the Bishop of Salisbury at the time of Domesday in 1086 and consisted of 70 hides.
