= Fuller baronets of the Inner Temple (1687) =

Fuller baronets
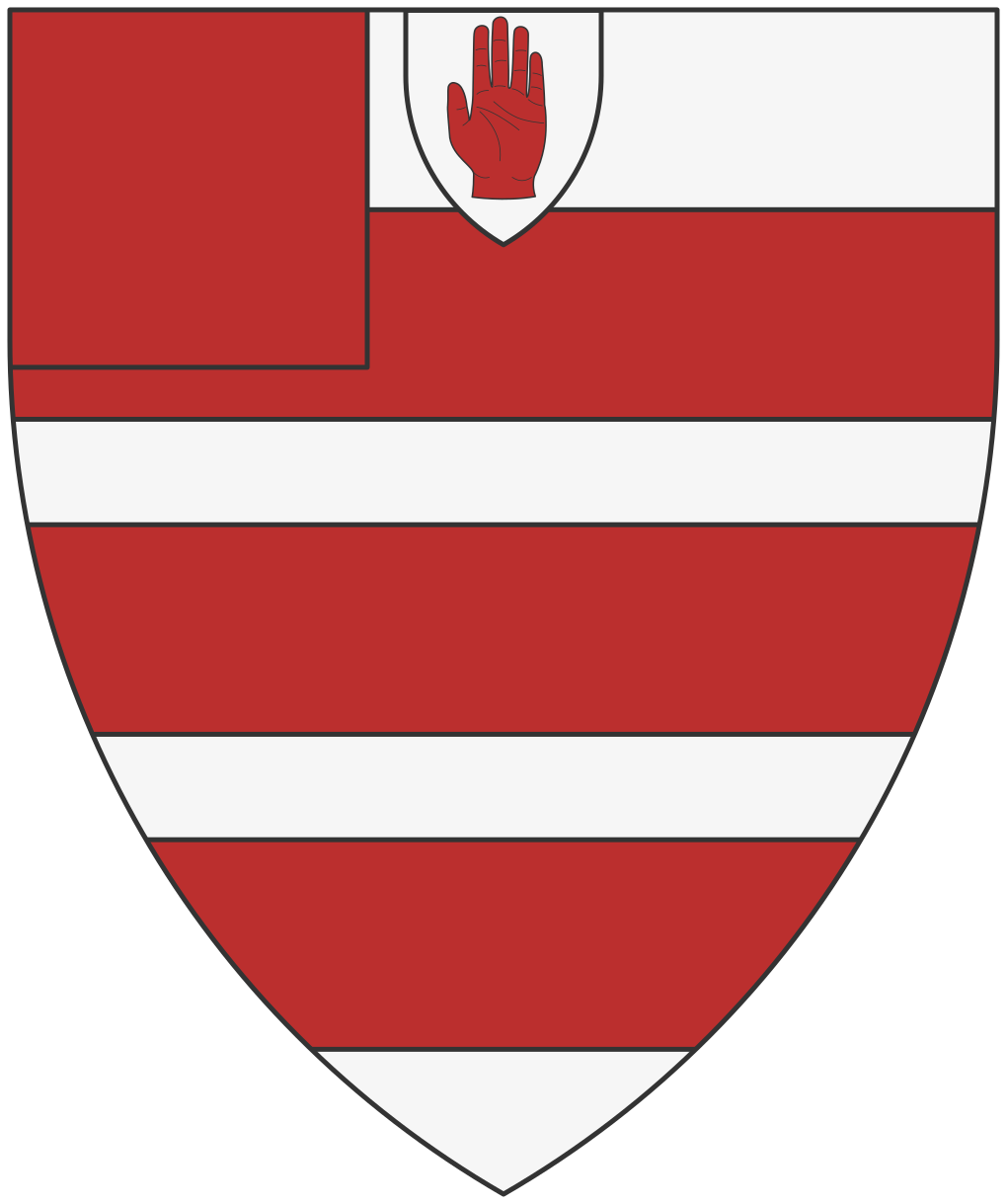
- Escutcheon of the Fuller baronets of the Inner Temple
- Creation date: 1687
- Status: extinct
- Extinction date: 1709
- Arms: Argent, three bars and a canton gules
- Crest: Out of a ducal coronet a plume of three ostrich feathers

The Fuller baronetcy, of the Inner Temple, was created in the Baronetage of England on 1 August 1687 for James Chapman Fuller. The title became extinct on his death in 1709, in the Fleet Prison. He was twice married, but left no children. His second wife was the widow Emma of Sir Edward Winter or Wintour. Winter's first wife died in 1680/1, and he then married the widow Emma Withe née Howe, daughter of Richard Howe of Norfolk, this being the second marriage of both parties. Winter died in 1686.

Fuller had a court connection under James II and VII, through the property of his sister-in-law Catherine of Braganza near Terrington St Clement, now so called, that went under the name of the Bishop of Ely's manor: he was its tax farmer. In 1696, under William and Mary, the property passed to William Bentinck, 1st Earl of Portland.

== Fuller baronets, of the Inner Temple (1687) ==
- Sir James Chapman Fuller, 1st Baronet (c.1652–1709)
