= St Lawrence, Stratford-sub-Castle =

Church in Wiltshire, England

Coordinates: 51.0928°N 1.8153°W

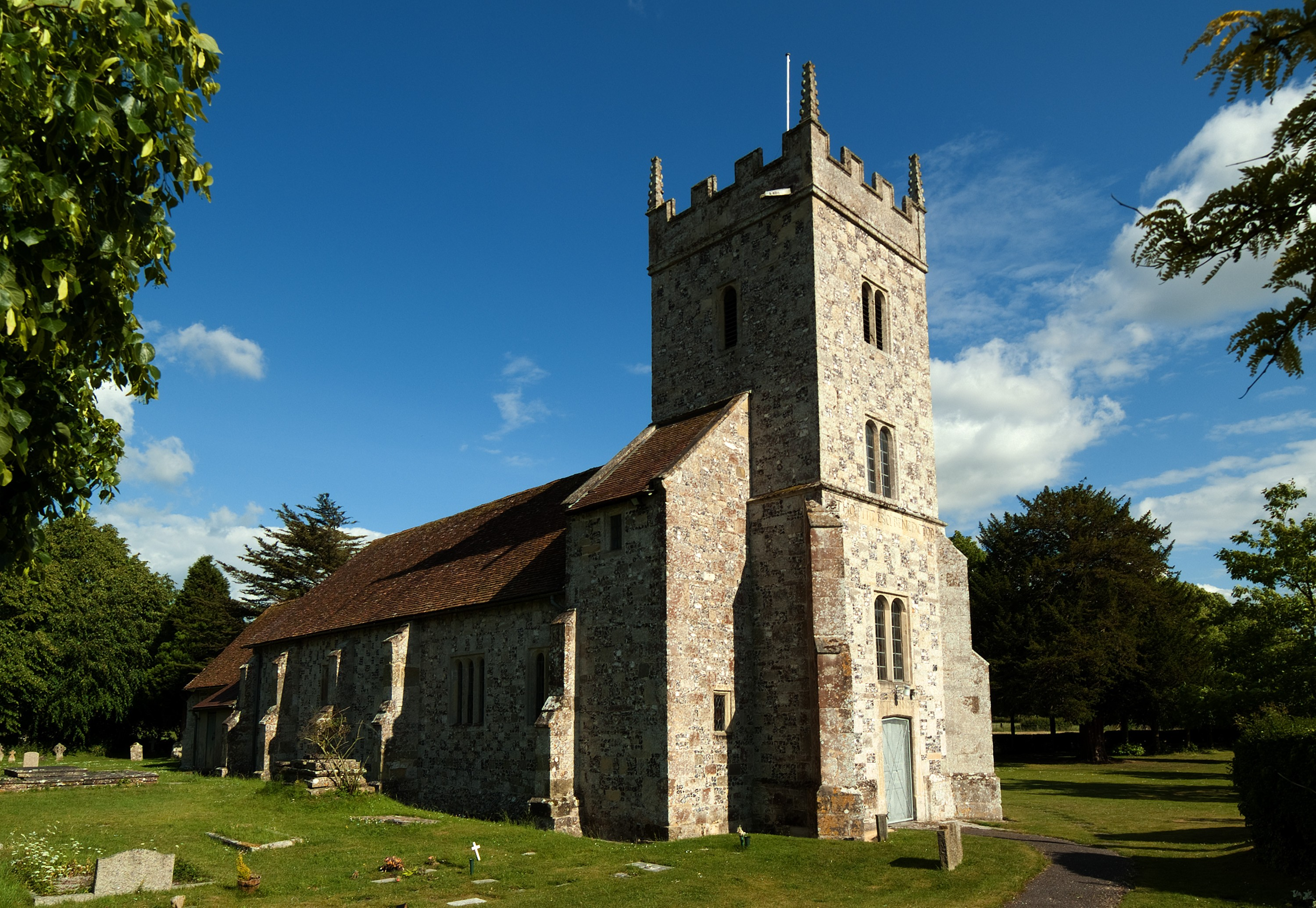
St Lawrence's church, Stratford-sub-Castle

St Lawrence's Church at Stratford-sub-Castle is a 13th-century Grade I listed Church of England parish church, to the north of Salisbury, Wiltshire, England. It stands close to the abandoned settlement of Old Sarum and the River Avon, and is about 2 miles (3.2 km) north of Salisbury Cathedral.

== Construction and architecture ==
The church stands at the north end of Stratford-sub-Castle village, but was formerly surrounded by a medieval settlement.

A chapel at Stratford is first mentioned in 1228, dependent on St Martin's church. The presence of an earlier building is known from evidence of walls and floors of a 12th or 13th-century building, found in 2008 in the churchyard. The present church has an early 13th-century chancel, indicated by the chancel arch and a blocked lancet window in the north wall. There was a consecration in 1326, for reasons that are unclear.

The west tower was erected in the 13th or 14th century and rebuilt in 1711 by Thomas Pitt, a wealthy merchant who had bought Old Sarum manor. The nave was built in the 15th century. Alterations and repairs in the next two centuries and around 1711 included renewal of windows; the wagon roof, with carved bosses, is from the 16th century. The building is in flint and stone, in places chequered, and may incorporate masonry from Old Sarum Cathedral: two pieces of stone have lozenge decoration in Norman style. The church was designated as Grade I listed in 1972.

== Interior ==
The Purbeck marble font is probably from the late 12th century, but may have been brought from elsewhere. The bowl was originally square but the corners were removed to make it octagonal, thus there are four faces with carving and four that are plain. The shaft and base are modern.

The interior is called "attractive" by Julian Orbach in his update of Nikolaus Pevsner's Buildings of England volume. The wagon roofs of the nave and chancel are from the later 16th century, and have carved wooden heads at the bosses and various busts at the corbels. The pulpit with tester is from the early 17th century.

Orbach considers the chancel screen to be perhaps an assemblage made as part of the 1711 work, with a round-headed arch of that period inserted into a structure from the 15th or 16th century. Also of c.1711 is the full-height panelling above the altar, which Orbach calls "remarkable" and "good enough for a City of London church". The window is flanked by Commandment panels, and the reredos has fine foliage carving, pilasters and a broken pediment. The altar rail has turned balusters and there is dado panelling and panel-fronted pews. The elaborate royal arms is from 1713.

The west gallery is c.1800 and carries the organ, which was built in 1852 by J. W. Walker as a barrel organ and converted to keyboard action in 1876. The only stained glass of note is the east window of 1894, by Lavers and Westlake. The interior was carefully restored in 1905 by W. D. Caröe.

In 1553 there were three bells, but one was sold in 1584. In 1998, another of the original bells was sold and five new bells hung, retaining the last original bell (dated 1594) as the treble, making a ring of six.

== Churchyard ==
A section of the churchyard contains graves of 52 service personnel of World War I and World War II that are looked after by the Commonwealth War Graves Commission. Most from the former war (47) were from local war hospitals, and around half of those are Australian soldiers. Standing over the graves is a Cross of Sacrifice.

Between the church and the road stands the parish war memorial, erected in 1922. The tapering limestone shaft carries a gabled depiction of the crucifixion, in all about 5 metres (16 ft) tall.

== Parish ==
Although technically a chapelry of St Martin's until at least 1701, St Lawrence was regarded as a parish church from 1394 or earlier, having its own graveyard and baptistry.

In 1937, part of the parish was transferred to create a new parish for St Francis's Church in the expanding northern suburbs of the city. The Old Sarum area was added to Stratford-sub-Castle parish in 1953, and there were further boundary changes affecting St Lawrence and St Francis in 1968. Today, there is a united benefice named 'Salisbury St Francis and Stratford sub Castle', although the two parishes remain distinct.

The parish registers date from 1654, and those not in current use are held in the Wiltshire and Swindon History Centre at Chippenham.

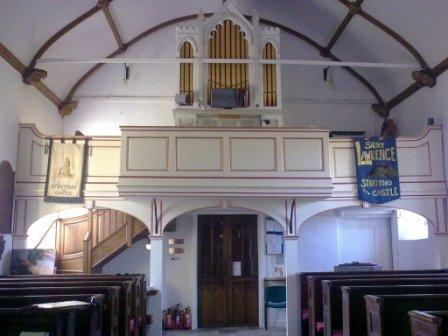
Interior: west end

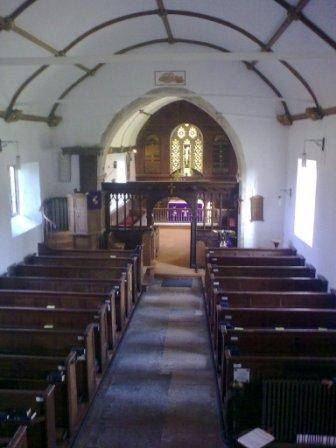
Interior: east

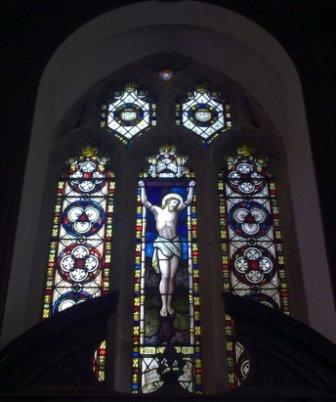
East window

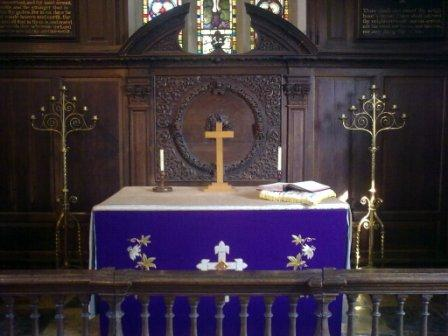
Altar
