= Edward Maltby (British civil servant) =

British civil servant (1811-1889)

Governor of Madras Presidency (acting)
- In office 26 November 1863 – 18 January 1864
- Preceded by: William Denison
- Succeeded by: William Denison

Personal details
- Born: 5 January 1811
- Died: 4 December 1889 Brighton, England
- Spouse: Jenny Pennycuick

Edward Maltby (5 January 1811 – 4 December 1889) was a British civil servant of the Indian Civil Service who acted as the Governor of Madras from 26 November 1863 to 18 January 1864.

== Early life ==
Maltby was born in 1811 to British banker and merchant Thomas Maltby (1752–1830) and Henrietta Crichton (1770–1837). He was the seventh of the couple's eight children.

Maltby was educated at Winchester College from 1826 to 1829 and Haileybury College from 1829 to 1832. In 1832, Maltby cleared the civil service examinations and qualified for the Indian Civil Service.

== Career ==
Maltby served in the Madras Civil Service for thirty-two years, from 1832 to 1864. He acted as the Chief Secretary to the Government of Madras. When the Governor of Madras William Denison was appointed to act as the Viceroy of India, Maltby was appointed in his stead to function as the Governor of Madras. Maltby was nominated to the Madras Legislative Council in 1864 and served a single term.

On retirement in 1865, Maltby was offered a knighthood but he declined the offer.

== Family ==
Maltby married Jenny Pennycuick, daughter of John Pennycuick at Betchworth, Surrey on 12 October 1843. The couple had eleven children—seven sons and five daughters.
