= Aaron Baker =

English colonial agent in India (1610–1683)

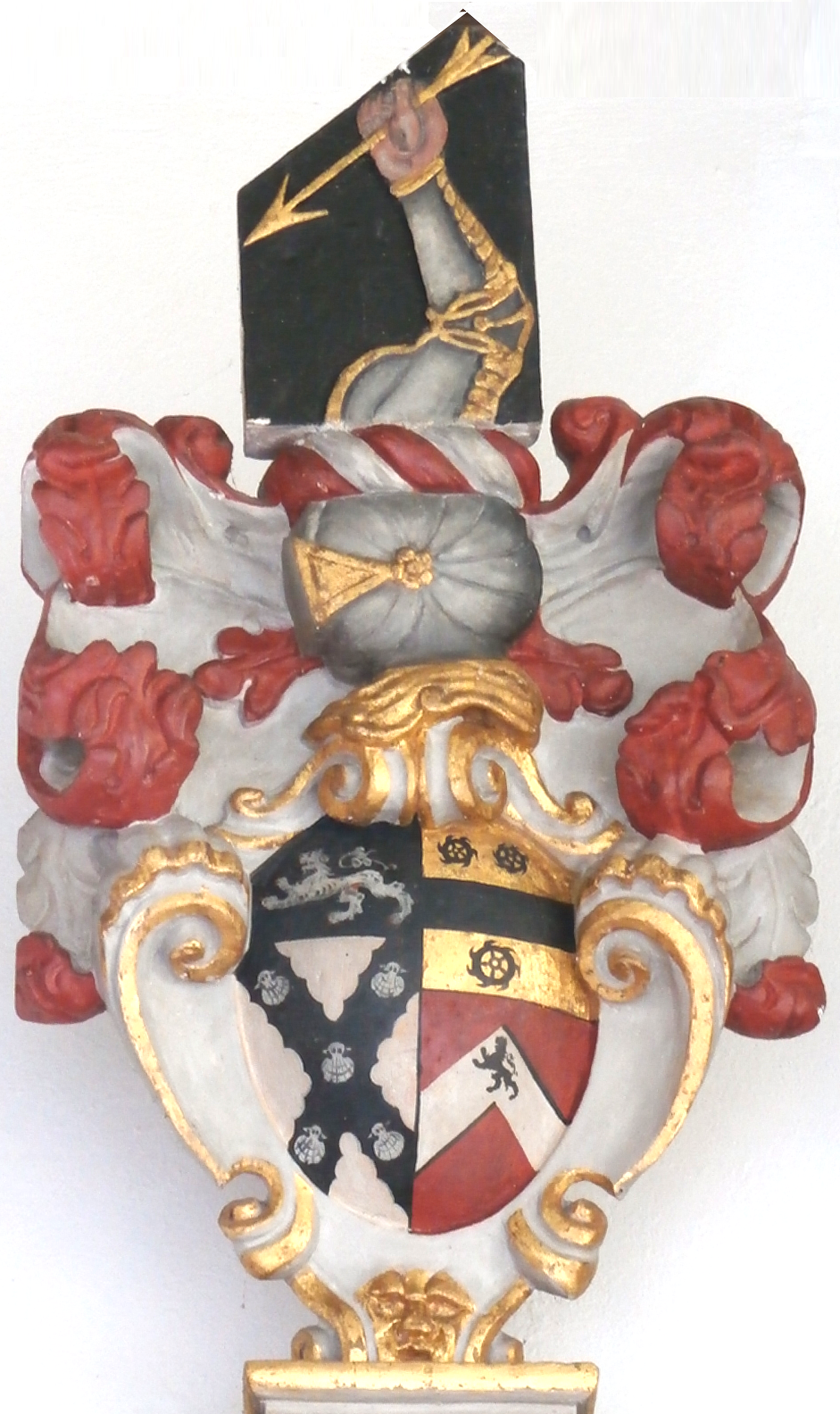
Arms of Aaron Baker (1620–1683), detail from his mural monument in Dunchideock Church: Argent, on a saltire engrailed sable five escallops of the first on a chief of the second a lion passant of the first (Baker, of which the arms of the Baker Baronets (1796) of Dunstable House, Richmond, Surrey, are a difference); impaling the arms of his two wives, with crest of Baker above

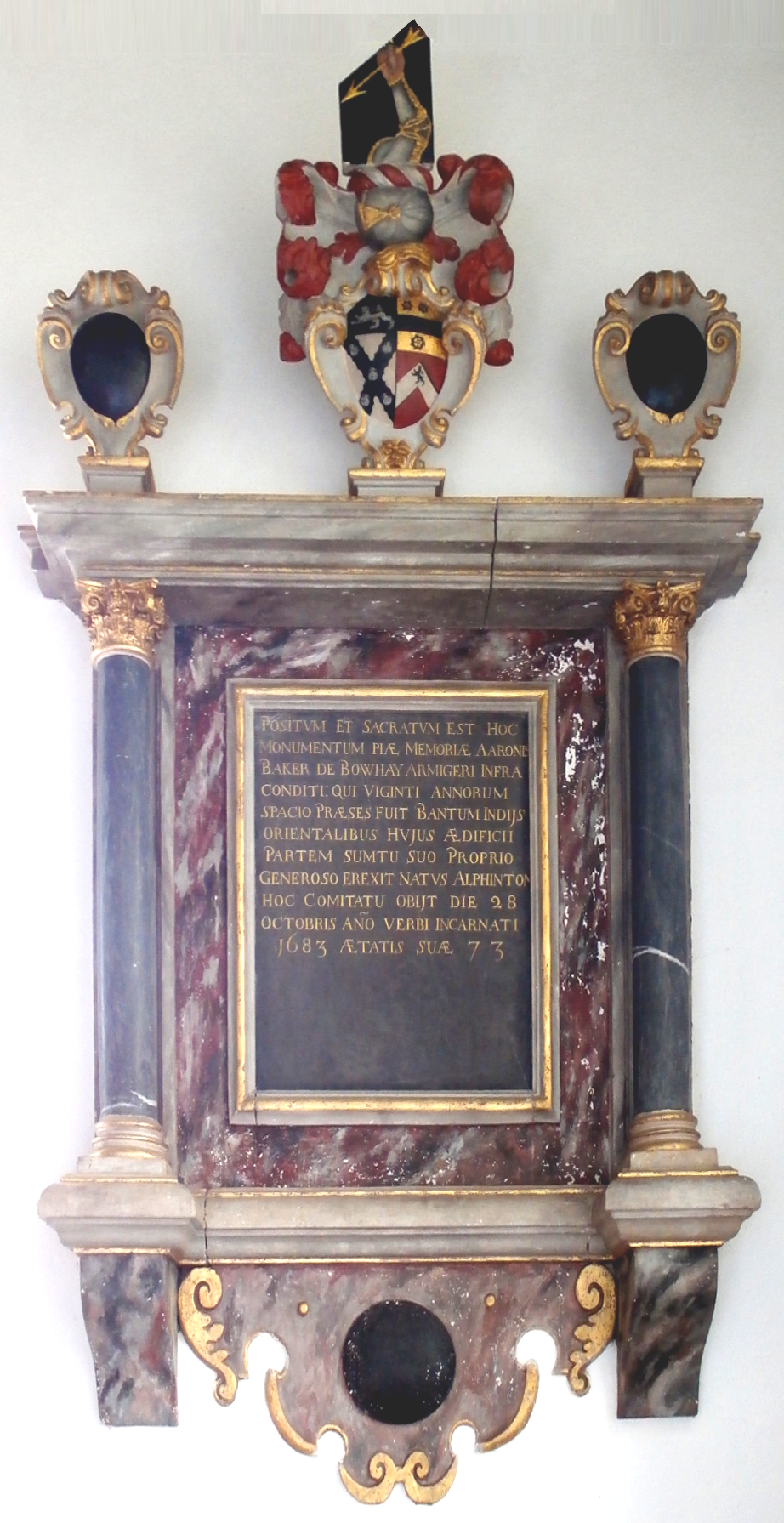
Mural monument to Aaron Baker in Dunchideock Church, Devon

Aaron Eli Baker (1610–1683) of Bowhay in the parish of Exminster, near Exeter, Devon, was an English colonial agent of the Honourable East India Company, who served as the first President of the Madras Presidency (1652-1655). He was for the duration of twenty years President of Bantam in the East Indies. He made a fortune in the East India trade.

== Origins ==
Baker was born in the parish of Alphington, near Exeter, Devon, as is recorded on his mural monument in Dunchideock Church.

== Madras period ==
Baker was the first President of Madras when the Presidency of Fort St George was created in the year 1652. He served as President from 1652 to 1655. In 1652-53, caste conflicts arose between "left-hand" and "right-hand castes" which was settled by the English, who reserved the eastern half of the Indian quarter of the city for the "left-hand" castes and the western half of the quarter for the "right-hand" castes. During this period the area around Madras was in great turmoil due to the rebellion of Mir Jumla against his overlord in Golconda. During this time Bala Rao, the chief of Poonamallee, raised the customs duties on English goods thereby causing a drastic increase in prices. Madras was besieged by Bala Rao and his colleague, Tupaki Krishnappa Naick. This blockade and the economic boycott of English trade by Bala Rao forced the English to reduce Fort St George from a Presidency to an Agency at the termination of Baker's term of office.

== Dismissal ==
Private trade was eventually allowed while holding Presidency positions but had at first been frowned upon; both Aaron Baker and Sir Edward Winter were ultimately dismissed for engaging in it.

== Retirement in England ==
Baker retired to Bowhay in the parish of Exminster, Devon, England, with the fortunes he earned. In 1669 he rebuilt the north chancel aisle of St. Michael's church in Dunchideock, near Exminster, where is a monument to his memory.

== Marriages ==
Baker married twice:

- Firstly to a certain Elizabeth (d.1652), who died in childbirth at sea when on her way to join her husband in Madras, and has the distinction of having the oldest English tombstone in India.
- Secondly on 25 July 1672, in the parish church of Dunchideock, Devon, "Mr. Aaron Baker of Exminster" married "Mrs Mary Rowe of the parish of Ayston".

== Death and burial ==
Baker died in 1683 and is buried in St. Michael's Church, Dunchideock, where survives his mural monument. By coincidence or otherwise, a later Governor of Madras, Sir Robert Palk, 1st Baronet (1717-1798), lived in the parish of Dunchideock at Haldon House and was buried in the same parish church.

== Monument at Dunchideock ==
A mural monument to Aaron Baker survives in St Michael's Church, Dunchideock, situated on the north wall of the north aisle chapel. It is inscribed in Latin as follows:

Positum et sacratum est hoc monumentum piae memoriae Aaronis Baker de Bowhay Armigeri infra conditi qui viginti annorum spacio praeses fuit Bantum Indiis Orientalibus. Huius aedificii partem sum(p)tu suo proprio generoso erexit. Natus Alphinton hoc comitatu; obiit die 28 Octobris An(n)o Verbi Incarnati 1683 aetatis suae 73 ("This monument is placed and sacred to the pious memory of Aaron Baker of Bowhay, Esquire, embalmed below, who during the space of twenty years was President of Bantum in the East Indies. He erected at his own noble expense part of this building. He was born in Alphington in this county; he died on the 28 day of October in the year of the Word Incarnate 1683, of his age 73").

Above are shown the arms of Baker: Argent, on a saltire engrailed sable five escallops of the first on a chief of the second a lion passant of the first; impaling the arms of his two wives: in chief: Or, a fess between three Catherine wheels sable (possibly Brentingham); in base: Gules, on a chevron argent a lion rampant sable. Above is the crest of Baker: A man's dexter arm embowed argent garnished or grasping in the hand an arrow point downward of the last.

Preceded by Thomas Greenhill	President of Madras; 1652–1655	Succeeded by Thomas Greenhill
