= Joseph Collett =

British administrator

President of Fort St George (Madras)
- In office 8 January 1717 – 18 January 1720
- Preceded by: Edward Harrison
- Succeeded by: Francis Hastings

Personal details
- Born: 1673
- Died: 1725
- Spouse: Mary Ross
- Children: Elizabeth Collett; John Collett(1698–1716); Henrietta Collett; Mary Collett; Ann Collett
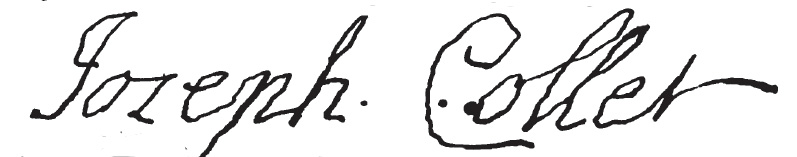
- Signature

Joseph Collett (1673–1725) was a British administrator in the service of the British East India Company. He served as the deputy-governor of Bencoolen from 1712 to 1717 and as governor of the Madras Presidency from 1717 to 1720. He re-built Hertford Castle in England and stood for election to the British Parliament.

== Early life ==
Joseph Collett was born in 1673 in England to glover John Collett(1642–1698) and Mary Holloway. He married Mary Ross at a young age. He joined the British East India Company after Mary's death in 1710 and was appointed Deputy-Governor of Sumatra. In 1711, while sailing to Rio de Janeiro, his ship Jane was captured by the French. However, he secured his release after paying a huge ransom.

== As deputy-governor of Bencoolen ==
On 1 September 1712, Collett arrived at York Fort in Bencoolen in Sumatra and was subsequently appointed deputy-governor of Bencoolen under the authority of the governor of Madras. In 1714, he built a new fort and restored order in war-ridden Sumatra. Collett moved his residence to the newly constructed Fort Marlborough. Collett was appointed President of Madras in 1716 and took office on 8 January 1717.

During his tenure as the deputy-governor of Bencoolen, Collett is believed to have made the infamous remark on the rajas of the East Indies:

I treat them as a man treats his wife, very complaisant in trifles, but immovable in matters of importance

== Tenure as President of Madras ==
=== Caste conflicts ===
Immediately after his assumption of the Presidential chair, Collett was entrusted with the responsibility of tackling an irksome situation. The last days of Harrison's presidency had seen some intense communal clashes between the Komatis and the Chetties . A settlement had been reached but the terms of the settlement weren't kept and the Chetties deserted the British and moved out of Madras in large numbers. When Collett took over as president, he was faced with the task of curbing the exodus. Accordingly, he ordered that the belongings of the deserted Chetties be confiscated. At the same time, he issued a proclamation which forbade individuals from the left-hand castes to worship in temples belonging to those of the right-hand castes and thopse from the right-hand castes in temples belonging to the left-hand castes.

=== Farrukh Siyar's firman and hostilities with Carnatic ===
On 24 July 1717, the issue of a firman in the name of the British East India Company was celebrated with an elaborate ceremony. As per the terms of the firman, the Presidency of Madras occupied Divy Island off the coast of Masulipatnam.

Meanwhile, the British once again sought the Nawab of the Carnatic demanding that he hand over the village of Tiruvottiyur under his occupation to the British as per the Imperial firman issued by the Mughal Emperor Farrukh Siyar. However, the Nawab refused to yield stating that he had no faith in the words of the President as he had not seen the provisions of the firman. However, a compromise was agreed upon and the President wrote back informing the Nawab that he intended to take over Tiruvottiyur by 23 September 1717. In return, he promised to gift the Nawab 500 pagodas and a piece of fine scarlet cloth and 200 pagodas to his son-in-law Dakha Roy. On 23 September, as per the plan, Collett travelled to Tiruvottiyur and took possession of the place apart from two other villages. But, on 29 September, the Nawab's representative at Poonamallee blockaded the road to Fort St George advising the British that the Nawab would not accept anything less than 1,000 pagodas in return for Tiruvottiyur. Fresh threats soon arose to the British occupation of Divy Island. Struck by financial crisis, Collett decided to rent five villages obtained by the firman at the rate of 1,200 per annum each for 12 years.

Enraged when the demands were not met, on 18 October, Dayaram, the Head Renter of the territory who waS subordinate to the Nawab of Carnatic, marched to Tiruvottiyur with an army of 250 horse and 1000 foot, removed the British flag and took possession of the village. A consultation was held according to which the members of the Board pressed the President to remove Dayaram and his troops by force.

On 19 October, Lieutenant John Roach marched into Tiruvottiyur at the head of 150 men and drove away Dayaram and his men. Dayaram's men resisted but ROach inflicted a crushing defeat upon them and pursued them in their flight to the plains surrounding Madras. A fresh body of 500 men were sent by the Nawab to attack the company's troops from the north. But Lieutenant Roach and his men were saved by the arrival of timely reinforcements from Madras. Lieutenant Fullerton arrived on the scene with 100 men and the combined forces defeated Dayaram and pursued the fleeing troops up to Sattangodu. Their mission accomplished, the Company troops made a quick retreat to Fort St George.

When Lieutenant Roach arrived at Madras, the Muslim inhabitants of the town rose in rebellion against the British. After a battle lasting six hours, the forces of the Carnatic and supporters of the Nawab were flushed out from the city and its environs.This was an overwhelming victory for the heavily outnumbered forces of the British East India Company against a much superior power. Lieutenant Roach who had commanded the operations in Fort St David as well as Tiruvottiyur was rewarded with increase of pay.

The Nawab proposed peace to the President and accordingly, on 15 December 1718, peace was concluded between the Nawab of the Carnatic and the British East India Company. Collett agreed to pay 2,000 pagodas to the Nawab and 1,000 pagodas to Dakhna Roy in return for the outlying villages.

Since the conclusion of peace, cordial relations existed between the Nawab of Carnatic and the British East India Company. When Dakhna Roy, the Prime Minister to the Nawab visited Madras in February 1719, he was given a grand reception and was allotted a fine house in Black Town for his stay.

=== Reforms and proclamations ===
On 27 May 1717, a proposal for the inauguration of two Charity schools for slaves of the English inhabitants of Madras, one in Black Town and another in White Town was approved by Collett. In April 1719, Joseph Collett issued a proclamation authorizing severe measures against Portuguese Roman Catholics of St. Thome marrying Protestants from Madras. On 25 May 1719, Collett recruited one George Foriano to translate Portuguese documents into English and vice versa making him the first translator in the company's service at Madras. On 9 July 1719, the Honorable Court of Directors voted to reduce the garrison at Fort St George to 360 and the garrison at Fort St David to 340.

In November 1719, Collett issued a proclamation changing tax laws on the registration of land and slaves. In the very same month, registration of all houses and gardens in Black Town were made compulsory by another proclamation. However, when the extreme poor complained to the President regarding their inability to pay such high rates for registration, Collett issued an amendment by which all houses valued at less than 50 pagodas were exempted from taxation.

Collett founded a new colony for weavers and painters of cloth near Tiruvottiyur. This village was called Collettpettah in his honor. According to a report submitted by Collett to the Directors on 28 December 1719, the hamlet had a population of 489 inhabiting 105 houses.

In October 1719, Joseph Collett proposed to resign and return to England expressing his inability to bear the harsh clime of the city during the previous month. He proposed the name of Francis Hastings of Fort St David as successor but the Directors chose Nathaniel Elwick instead. Accordingly, Collett resigned and almost immediately set out for England. He was replaced with Nathaniel Elwick.

== Later life ==
Collett made an enormous fortune as President of Madras. He returned to England on 8 January 1720 and settled at Hertford with his daughters Henrietta and Mary. In 1721, he transferred his membership to the Barbican church and stood for election to the British Parliament.

He died in 1725 leaving fifty pounds each to Joseph Burroughs and Isaac Kimber. The self-penned inscription on his tomb in Bunhill Fields reveals his semi-Arian sympathies in the phrase: "The gift of the only and only supreme God the Father, by the ministration of His Son Jesus Christ".

Preceded by Edward Harrison	President of Madras; 8 January 1717 – 18 January 1720	Succeeded by Francis Hastings
