= A Neighbour's Landmark =

1924 short story by M.R. James

- Short story by M. R. James
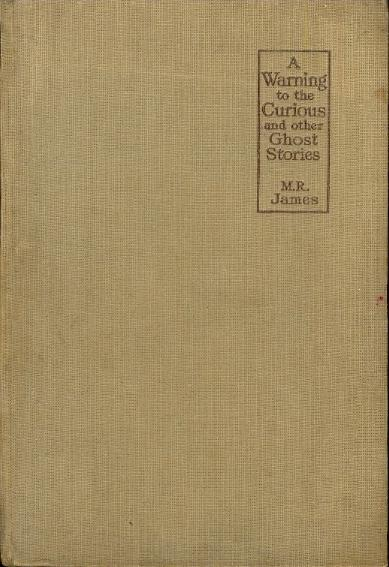
- "A Neighbour's Landmark" was collected in A Warning to the Curious in 1925

Text available at Wikisource
- Country: United Kingdom
- Language: English
- Genre: Ghost story

Publication
- Published in: The Eton Chronic
- Publication type: Print, ephemeral
- Publication date: 17 March 1924

"A Neighbour's Landmark" (Note: The title of the story is a reference to Deuteronomy 19:14 - "Thou shalt not take nor remove thy neighbour's landmark".) is a short story by M. R. James, first published in The Eton Chronic [sic] on 17 March 1924, and collected in James' books A Warning to the Curious and Other Ghost Stories (1925) and The Collected Ghost Stories of M. R. James (1931). The story concerns the haunting of a stolen plot of land by Theodosia Ivie. It was adapted for radio by BBC Radio 4 FM in 1968.

== Plot summary ==
The story opens with the unnamed narrator visiting his friend Reginald Philipson at Betton Court one August to help catalogue its library. While looking through papers, the narrator finds an anonymous letter sent from an beneficed clergyman to a bishop which contains the passage:

...This Abuse (for I think myself justified in calling it by that name) is one which I am persuaded Your Lordship would (if 'twere known to you) exert your utmost efforts to do away. But I am also persuaded that you know no more of its existence than (in the words of the Country Song)

'That which walks in Betton Wood Knows why it walks or why it cries.'

But I have said enough upon this Topick...

The narrator, who is interested in folklore, is intrigued by the passing reference to Betton Wood. He learns from Philipson that Betton Wood was located one mile away, on the crest of Betton Hill, but was stubbed up by his father and is now used as rough pasture. Philipson leaves to ask Mitchell, an elderly man living in the area, about Betton Wood.

The narrator goes for a walk, during which an "indistinct impulse" causes him to bear left at each fork in the path, eventually walking up a lane to a field. While surveying the landscape, the narrator twice hears "a note of incredible sharpness, like the shriek of a bat, only ten times intensified". The narrator describes the sound as being "...from outside. 'With no language but a cry'". (Note: "With no language but a cry" is a quote from the poem In Memoriam A.H.H. by Alfred, Lord Tennyson.) Unnerved, the narrator hurries back to Betton Court, where he learns from Philipson that the field where he held the noise was the site of Betton Wood.

After dinner, Philipson recounts his visit to Mitchell. Mitchell tells Philipson how in his childhood his mother had formerly used Betton Wood as a shortcut to a farm, but had been frightened by piercing screams. At the advice of Mitchell's father, Philipson's father has Betton Wood cleared, but local people still fear the area. Philipson locates a note from his father that states that the lady who owned Betton Court before Philipson's family, Theodosia Ivie, had stolen "a fair piece of the best pasture in Betton parish what belonged by rights to two children as hadn't no one to speak for them" by removing a landmark, and later disappeared after having committed fraud in London. The lady is rumoured to be cursed for removing the landmark, and fated to hunt Betton Wood until the wrong is made right. Philipson's father notes that he has been unable to identify the extent of the land that was stolen or the rightful owners; as an alternative, each year he sets aside the proceeds from five acres of land for "the common benefit of the parish and to charitable uses".

== Publication ==
"A Neighbour's Landmark" was first published on 17 March 1924 in The Eton Chronic, an ephemeral magazine published at Eton College (where James was provost). It was collected in James' book A Warning to the Curious and Other Ghost Stories in 1925. In 1931, it was collected in James' book The Collected Ghost Stories of M. R. James.

Stuart Fisher suggests that the setting of the story, Betton Wood, was inspired by Betton Copse in Shropshire, which is rumoured to be haunted. Jeremy Musson notes that the library of Betton Court is speculated to be inspired by the "vast Classical library" of Sledmere Park [sic], where James' friend Sir Mark Sykes Bt lived.

== Reception ==
"A Neighbour's Landmark" forms part of what critic Michael Kellermeyer describes as James' "puzzle-story phase," consisting of oblique tales that require an unusual amount of interpretation.

A. E. Housman describes "A Neighbour's Landmark" as "good poetry".

Michael Cox and R. A. Gilbert state that the opening of the story "both emphasizes the 'otherness' of the Victorian period and justifies our somewhat elastic definition of 'Victorian'." Darryl Jones offers the story as an example of how "[James'] nostalgic sensibility permeates the stories themselves".

The story was reviewed in Everett F. Bleiler's 1983 work The Guide to Supernatural Fiction.

== Adaptations ==
On 17 September 1968, BBC Radio 4 FM adapted "A Neighbour's Landmark" as a 30-minute Story Time segment, produced by David Davis and read by Howieson Culff.

In 2009, BBC Audio released Ghost Stories Volume Two, which included an audio adaptation of "A Neighbour's Landmark".
