= Matthias Vincent =

British administrator

Sir Matthias Vincent

Chief of the factories in the Bay of Bengal
- In office 7 September 1677 – 24 November 1681
- Preceded by: Walter Clavell
- Succeeded by: William Hedges

Personal details
- Born: c. 1645 North Hill, Cornwall, England
- Died: 1687

Sir Matthias Vincent (c. 1645–1687) was an English administrator for the East India Company (EIC) before becoming MP for Lostwithiel.

== Family ==
He was the younger son of John Vincent (d.1646) of Battens, North Hill, Cornwall by his wife Sarah and educated at Westminster School. In 1620 John Vincent was disclaimed at the heralds’ visitation of 1620, and prosecuted in the court of chivalry for usurping the arms of the Surrey family. He then took holy orders but was unable to obtain a benefice before the Civil War and moved frequently. Matthias Vincent’s eldest brother became a fellow of All Souls in 1654.

== India ==
Vincent joined the EIC as a factor in 1622 at a salary of £20 per annum. In 1667 he was appointed to the company's governing council in Hooghly, becoming third in seniority at the Bay of Bengal factories in 1669. Following the death of John Marsh, he became Chief at Cassimbazar, arousing the wrath of Joseph Hall who said that Vincents "Actions will not admit of the Light, being works of Darkness's and therefore all he doth in the Companys Affairs must be in hugger muggur." Nevertheless, on the death of Walter Clavell Vincent became "Chief of the factories in the Bay of Bengal".

During his time at Hooghly, Vincent was accused by the Company of appropriating commissions due to it and of trading in goods, including pepper and copper, on his own account. Furthermore, a member of the Council at Hooghly claimed that Vincent had "practised Diabolicall arts with the Braminees (Brahmins)" and had bewitched him so that Vincent could "better fulfil his lustful desires with his Wife." His accuser, to the horror of Vincent's superiors in back in London, also claimed he had used charms and poisons against people with the assistance of "Witches or other natives".

After the notorious interloper Thomas Pitt married Vincents's niece, the EIC lost confidence in Vincent. In 1682 William Hedges, the EIC's new Bengal Agent, arrived in Hooghly with instructions to remove Vincent from his post. However, aware that he was about to be taken prisoner, Vincent appeared with a party of well armed soldiers and forced Hedges to retreat to the Dutch settlement of Chinsurah further inland. Vincent's position was further strengthened by the arrival of his protege Thomas Pitt with more men. After two futile years, Hedges gave up in his attempt and fled India for Persia.

=== Rugo the Podar affair ===
In 1673 a charge was brought against Vincent that he had been responsible for the death of the Hooghly Factory's cashier or podar. Streynsham Master, the Company's erstwhile Madras Agent was ordered to investigate the matter. It transpired that Rugo had been placed in the custody of Anant Ram, the Factory's broker on Vincent's orders to recover a sum of money he owed to the Company. Rugo died the first night he was in custody, with Ram claiming in a later deposition that he had only caused the Podar and his son "to be beaten with a few blows with a small stick, as little as the pen that is written withall." The matter was closed (or hushed up) following a payment of 13,000 Rupees, which was charged to the Company's account. Although Vincent was cleared on the charge, the Company still sought his return to England and further legal action. At the same time he was ordered to repay the 13,000 Rupees.

== Subsequent career ==
In 1683 Vincent returned to England aboard one of Thomas Pitt's ships to live in a princely style as a rich nabob. He was knighted by James II of England on 20 March 1685, became treasurer of the Sons of the Clergy and was elected as MP for Lostwithiel, although he did not attend parliament. He was nominated as an alderman of the City of London in 1686 but died the following summer.

Also in 1686, William Penn granted 30,000 acres in northern Chester County, Pennsylvania, to three of his investors. Those men were Major Robert Thompson, Dr. Daniel Coxe, and Sir Matthias Vincent. This land grant was for 30,000 acres uncharted land, intended to be split evenly between Coxe, Vincent, and Thompson. However, the 10,000 acre parcel that Vincent received from Penn was located on the creek where Charles Pickering had been searching for silver before his death in 1684. Pickering had received a 5,386-acre grant from Penn that was originally separate from the 30,000 acres granted to Coxe, Vincent and Thompson, but after his death the area around the creek was referred to as part of his tract regardless. This included the land that was part of Vincent's tract, though officially the claims never actually overlapped.

Vincent would never physically see his new land because he died unexpectedly in the summer of 1687. When his heirs, his teenaged sons, Vincent and Theodore, reached the age of majority in the 1690s, they sold off the Vincent tract in Pennsylvania to another Quaker and friend of William Penn, Joseph Pike. The land that Vincent was granted by Penn is still part of Chester County, Pennsylvania, known as East Vincent township, West Vincent township, East Pikeland township, and West Pikeland township.

== Personal life ==
In around 1670 he married Mary Greenhill, the illegitimate daughter of Henry Greenhill, a high official in the British East India Company, and his Goanese mistress. Mary was born in Madras (now Chennai) India, and her mother was herself was the widow of another company merchant from Madras named John Gurney. Mary and Matthias had two sons and one other child together.

His wife was described as "an ardent Roman Catholic". It was noted that Mary's faith brought Matthias "embarrassment and the usual charges of corruption, immorality and extortion", but that his career was not dampened by his connections to "interlopers" until his niece married Thomas Pitt. In 1681, his arrest was ordered, but Vincent took refuge in the Dutch factory before returning to England with Pitt.

== Notes ==
1. Hugger-mugger, an archaic term meaning secret or clandestine
2. An individual trading on his own account in breach of the East India Company's monopoly
