= Sir William Langhorne, 1st Baronet =

Sir William Langhorne Bt
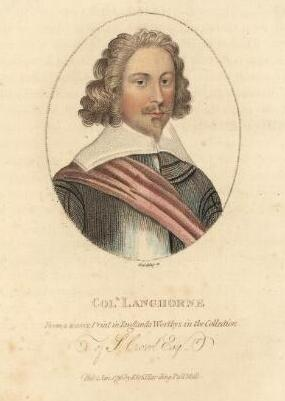

Agent of Fort St George (Madras)
- In office 1670–1678
- Preceded by: George Foxcroft
- Succeeded by: Streynsham Master

Personal details
- Born: c. 1631
- Died: 26 February 1715
- Spouse(s): Grace Chaworth (1699–1700), Mary Aston (1714–1715)

Sir William Langhorne, 1st Baronet (c. 1631 – 26 February 1715) was the Agent of Madras from January 1670 to 27 January 1678.

== Family and early life ==
William Langhorne was baptised on 26 July 1631 at St Gabriel Fenchurch, the son of William Langhorne and Mary née Oxenbridge.

Langhorne was born in a well-off family. His uncle Needham Langhorne left behind a vast fortune upon his death in 1673, his favourite property being the manor of Newton Bromswold in Northamptonshire. Langhorne was also a distant relation of first President of the United States George Washington.

Langhorne's father (also named William) was himself active in the East India Company, and had residences in Hitchin and in the parish of St Gabriel Fenchurch in the City of London.

Langhorne entered Trinity College, Cambridge on 23 October 1649. After taking his degree he became a barrister with his admission to Gray's Inn on 6 August 1664 but there is no evidence that he actively practised as a lawyer. Following his father's death he inherited stock in the East India Company, began to make money and was created a baronet (in the Baronetage of England) in 1668.

== Tenure as Agent of Madras ==
Langhorne arrived in Madras in 1670 to adjudicate in a dispute between Sir Edward Winter and George Foxcroft. A few months later, he was appointed as the Agent of Madras based at Fort St. George.

=== French siege of St Thome ===
In 1670, England under Charles II withdrew from the Triple Alliance and concluded peace with the French. Hostilities broke out with the British taking the side of the French against the Dutch thereby triggering the Third Anglo-Dutch War.

Hostilities were triggered on the Coromandel Coast when a French fleet of twelve ships of the newly established French East India Company commanded by Admiral De La Haye landed with three hundred men along the coast of St Thome and besieged the town which was under the sovereignty of Golconda. In July 1672, St Thome was stormed compelling the Sultan of Golconda to approach the British East India Company (EIC) at Madraspatnam. The factors at Madras, who were Protestants like the Dutch, secretly nourished pro-Dutch and anti-French sympathies. But the alliance that the British had with the French in Europe landed them in a dilemma. William Langhorne, the Agent of Madras, despite his hatred of the French, chose to remain inactive.

In the meantime, a Dutch fleet under Rickloff Van Goens, the Governor-General of Dutch India, laid siege to St Thome but were unsuccessful. An engagement took place between the Dutch fleet of fourteen ships and a British fleet of ten ships on 22 August 1673 in which three ships belonging to the EIC were sunk.

The French at St Thome who expected the British to help them against the Dutch were disheartened. They strengthened their fortifications at St Thome and established a new camp at Triplicane thereby posing a direct threat to the British settlement at Madras. The British held a consultation on 2 February 1674, but before the authorities could come to a conclusion of the proposed course of action, news of the Treaty of Westminster concluded between England and Holland reached Fort St George thereby bringing hostilities to an end. The French at St Thome surrendered to the Dutch on 16 August 1674 who in turn handed over the city to the authorities of the Sultan of Golconda thereby bringing the hostilities to an end. Triplicane was liberated in 1672 and made over to the British East India Company at an annual rent of 50 pagodas.

=== Payment of tribute ===
Despite its official existence as an independent entity, the Agency of Madras paid a tribute of 1200 pagodas to Neiknam Khan, the commander-in-chief of Golconda and later, his son Mirza Ibrahim Khan during the whole length of Langhorne's tenure. The Agency also paid an annual tribute to one Madan Pant who was the Prime Minister of Golconda. From 1674 onwards, the Agency also paid a regular tribute to the Naik of Chingleput and Pallavaram who were regarded as "old friends of the Company" apart from Lingappa, the Naik of Poonamallee.

=== Hostilities with Golconda ===
Around this time, Lingappa, the Naik of Poonamallee turned against the British when they refused to pay tribute. He complained to Golconda on the arrogance of the British of Madras exhorting the Qutb Shah of Golconda to invade and capture Fort St George. However, as the Qutb Shah was making plans to invade Madras the invasion of the Marathas consumed his attention. Madras was spared from an invasion but restrictions were imposed on trade with the colony. Trade of rice and corn were forbidden and Madras was required to present a thousand hundred yards of cloth along with an increased tribute.

The Company yielded at once and presented Golconda as well as Lingappa Naik to appease. The influence that Lingappa wielded increased manifold and he held supreme power between Armaghaum and Bijapur.

=== Religious tolerance ===
According to 19th-century historian James Talboys Wheeler, Langhorne was "far more tolerant of the religious opinions of others, than could have been expected in that intolerant age". He was reprimanded by the directors of the EIC "for firing your guns upon the naming of a church by the papists; we cannot approve thereof, and desire to give as little countenance and encouragement to that religion, as they do to ours; and we would have you discountenance, and discourage all of our nation that any ways incline to that profession."

=== Charges of private trade and recall ===
In 1676, charges of private trade were brought forth against William Langhorne by the Directors of the company. Major James Puckle who was sent to investigate the charges concluded that Langhorne was receiving an annual sum of 20,000 pagodas from an Indian merchant of Fort St George called Casa Verona (Kasi Veeranna). Both denied the accusations. Other sources state that he had a private income of £7000 a year, well above the £300 allowed by the company. However, despite Langhorne's violent protests he was recalled in January 1678 and replaced with Streynsham Master as the Agent of Madras.

== Later life and death ==
Langhorne amassed an enormous fortune through private illegal trade carried out during his tenure as the Agent of Madras and through trade with the Levant. Having arrived back in England he purchased the manor of Charlton, Kent in 1680. This estate had previously been owned by William Ducie. In 1707 he also purchased Hampstead, Middlesex. His marriage to Grace Chaworth, the Dowager Viscountess Chaworth, a sister of John Manners, 1st Duke of Rutland made him one of the richest men in England, despite lasting less than year before she died on 15 February 1700. On 16 October 1714 he remarried to one Mary Aston. He died on 26 February 1715 at the age of 85 without leaving behind any direct heirs to his fortune, his baronetcy became extinct on his death. He is buried in Charlton Parish Church.

Of his fortune, his will which was proved on 8 March 1715, left at least £1600 to be used in a similar manner to Queen Anne's Bounty, providing increased income to the clergy of poorer benefices. The Charlton estate was inherited by Sir John Conyers, bt, his sister's son. and the Hampstead estate by his other nephew William Langhorn Games and after Games' death without male issue by a cousin, Margaret Maryon. [Woodford FP & Croughton D. The legend of fourteen remainders. Camden History Review 2016 Vol 40 pp 7–9]

== Legacy ==
It was during the tenure of Sir William Langhorne that the residency of the Agents of Madras, a garden-house called the Guindy Lodge, was constructed. On India's independence, this became the Raj Bhavan and is the official residence of the governor of Tamil Nadu. It was also during this time that an Office of Archives was established to maintain the records of the Agency. The Council Room of Fort St George was allocated for this purpose. This later became the Madras Record Office. In 1909, the office was shifted to Egmore and has since become the Tamil Nadu State Archives. The Tamil Nadu State Archives is, therefore, one of the oldest record-keeping offices of the world and certainly the oldest such institution established by the British East India Company.

Political offices
Preceded by George Foxcroft	Agent of Madras; 1670–1678	Succeeded by Streynsham Master
Baronetage of the United Kingdom
New creation	Baronet (of Inner Temple); 1668–1715	Extinct
