= Francis Hastings (administrator) =

British administrator

President of Fort St George (Madras)
- In office 18 January 1720 – 15 October 1721
- Preceded by: Joseph Collett
- Succeeded by: Nathaniel Elwick

Personal details
- Died: 1721

Francis Hastings was a British administrator and a factor of the British East India Company who functioned as the President of Madras from 18 January 1720 to 15 October 1721.

== Tenure as President of Madras ==
Hastings' Presidency which lasted a year and a half.

On 19 February 1720, a Havildar had stopped a consignment of goods belonging to the British East India Company from passing through the village of Egmore and arrested the transporters. When the news reach the Directors the next morning, a dubash and later, the Company's chief peon were dispatched to negotiate with the Havildar. But when the Chief peon approached the Havildar, a struggle broke out between the peons and 50 of the Havildar's supporters in which the Chief peon shot dead the Havildar and 2 of his supporters. The chief peon was commended for his act by the President. However, these incidents and other misgivings were thoroughly investigated by Hastings' successor James Macrae.

Hastings regarded the Chetties of Madras with an amount of aversion and dislike. Hence, in April 1720, when the tidings of a secret correspondence between the Portuguese at Goa and the Chetties of Madras reached the ears of the Directors, Hastings proclaimed that the Chetties of Madras intended to desert the British and migrate en masse to the Portuguese colony of St. Thome. He placed the chief of the Chetties under confinement and promised a handsome reward to anyone who would provide a testimony to the conspiracy. But no one came forward. More important, Hastings provoked the ire of Factor Elwick who was thoroughly displeased with the President's conduct.

However, despite the internal troubles, Hastings' Presidency was one of relative calm. The Company maintained a peaceful relationship with the Nawab of Carnatic as well as the Mughal Subedar of Deccan.

On 15 October 1721 Francis Hastings was replaced with Nathaniel Elwick as the President of Fort St George.

== Later life ==
Francis Hastings died on 19 December 1721 and was the first to be buried in St. Mary's Church, Madras.

Preceded by Joseph Collett	President of Madras; 18 January 1720 – 15 October 1721	Succeeded by Nathaniel Elwick
