= Thomas Ivie =

English colonial administrator

Thomas Ivie was an English colonial administrator, the third agent of Madras after Andrew Cogan and Francis Day. He served in his post from 1644 to 1648.

During Ivie's period, the English got a confirmation of the grant of Madras from Damarla Venkatapathy Nayak's nephew and successor, Srirangarayalu. A new grant was issued confirming the English acquisition of Madras. Copies of this new grant which were presented to factor Greenhill by the new Raya in October/November 1645 have survived to the present day. As per the new grant, the village of Narikamedu to the west of Madraspatnam was added to the East India Company's dominions.

It was in 1646 that the first Hindu temple was constructed in Madras since the English acquisition. It was dedicated to Chenna Kesava Perumal and built on part of the grounds of the present High Court. The endowments were made by Naga Bhattan, the Company's powder-maker and Beri Timanna.

A few years from the English acquisition of Madras, the Sultan of Golconda attacked the region around Madras and the Raja of Chandragiri was forced to flee. The English, however, were diplomatic enough to establish cordial relations with the emerging Muslim power and offered the Sultan the services of their gunner when he blockaded Santhome in 1646.

== Early days ==
Thomas Ivie (1603–73) was the third son (of 20 siblings) to Colonel Thomas Ivie of Abbey House in Malmesbury. His ancestors had made their fortunes as clothiers and they were settled in the area from Kington to Hullavington. In his youth he had been apprenticed to Edmund Winn of Canning Street London in 1618 and gained his freedom from the Merchant Taylors Company in 1627. In 1629 he was acting as a shipping agent, carrying merchandise to the Barbary Coast in North Africa on the vessels ‘Consul of London’ and ‘Lydia of London’. Merchants who consigned goods to Ivie’s vessels complained of irregularities and that Ivie had "siphoned off much of the profits to himself". A special warrant was issued by the High Court of the Admiralty of England calling for Thomas Ivie to be arrested. It was to escape the prospect of bankruptcy and imprisonment that Ivie fled overseas. He married his first wife, Miss Stump (the Stump family being of Malmesbury), in 1630 and travelled to Guiana in 1633 with his wife’s nephew. Thomas joined the East India Company from 5 September 1639 – being in Madras from 1644-48. In later years, Thomas never tired of telling people how, during this time, he had been in command of thousands of people with whom he had previously lived in "constancy and fidelity". He left the service of the East India Company and returned to England via Bantam on 23 September 1648 on the "Seaflower". It was considered that he carried out his duties as Agent in Madras competently. His wife travelled to meet her returning husband but, on the journey, died in a coach accident.

== Lady Ivie ==
The now widowed Thomas Ivie sought a new wife. Accounts vary as to how he met the young (25 years his junior), widowed Theodosia Garrett (née Stepkin) 1628-1694. One account, from Theodosia’s close relation, stated that (having turned down her father’s previous suggested suitor) Theodosia was given no choice but to accept Ivie. The couple married in October 1649, before a marriage settlement had been agreed, and there were problems in the marriage from the start. Years of fighting, litigating against each other and separation culminated in Thomas appealing to the highest authority in the land (the Lord Protector Oliver Cromwell) to overturn an alimony award which had been made to his wife. The document he submitted to Cromwell was called Alimony Arraign’d and revealed all the gory details of the troubled marriage in Thomas Ivie’s own words. To everyone’s mortification, the document was widely read; the antiquarian John Aubrey who knew the Ivies and Stumps, being educated at Malmesbury himself, read a copy of Ivie’s appeal and thought it contained "as much baudry and beastliness as can be imagined". Despite this background, Thomas and Theodosia Ivie later reunited briefly and went on to have a daughter, Theodosia Ivie 1660-68. Thomas was knighted at the Restoration, hence Theodosia becoming Lady Ivie – a title she kept for the rest of her days, even after the death of Thomas and her own remarriage.

The death of their young daughter in 1668 prompted the couple to separate again – this time for good. The marriage ended in a veritable explosion of litigation between them as Thomas repeatedly tried, and failed, to get control of the estate his wife had inherited in Wapping. Yet again, Lady Ivie made a petition for alimony and also appealed to the Ecclesiastical Court for aid. Then there were complaints in the Court of Chancery and litigation at the King’s Bench as well as cases at the Court of Equity and the Court of Arches. Thomas Ivie was sued for alimony, libel, cruelty and desertion. As Thomas neared the end of his life, he tried to prevent his wife triumphing over him by making his Will on 17 November 1671, making bequests to his numerous nephews and nieces and making sure his estranged wife received nothing. He failed in this as litigation was ongoing at his death and court records showed awards against his estate which his executors were obliged to fulfil.

Lady Ivie remarried within just a few hours of Thomas Ivie’s death to an Irishman called James Bryan, but it was her penchant for forging documents that was to be her legacy. The pinnacle of her forging career was her 1684 trial where she challenged Thomas Neale for his land in East London. Though found not guilty at the subsequent trial – because it was impossible to bring the crime home to her personally – the accusation against her was enough to empower her opponents to challenge all her titles and, from the 1680s onwards, her life spiralled downwards.

Preceded by Francis Day	Agent of Madras; 1644–1648	Succeeded by Thomas Greenhill
