= Thomas Pitt =

British merchant, colonial administrator and politician (1653–1726)

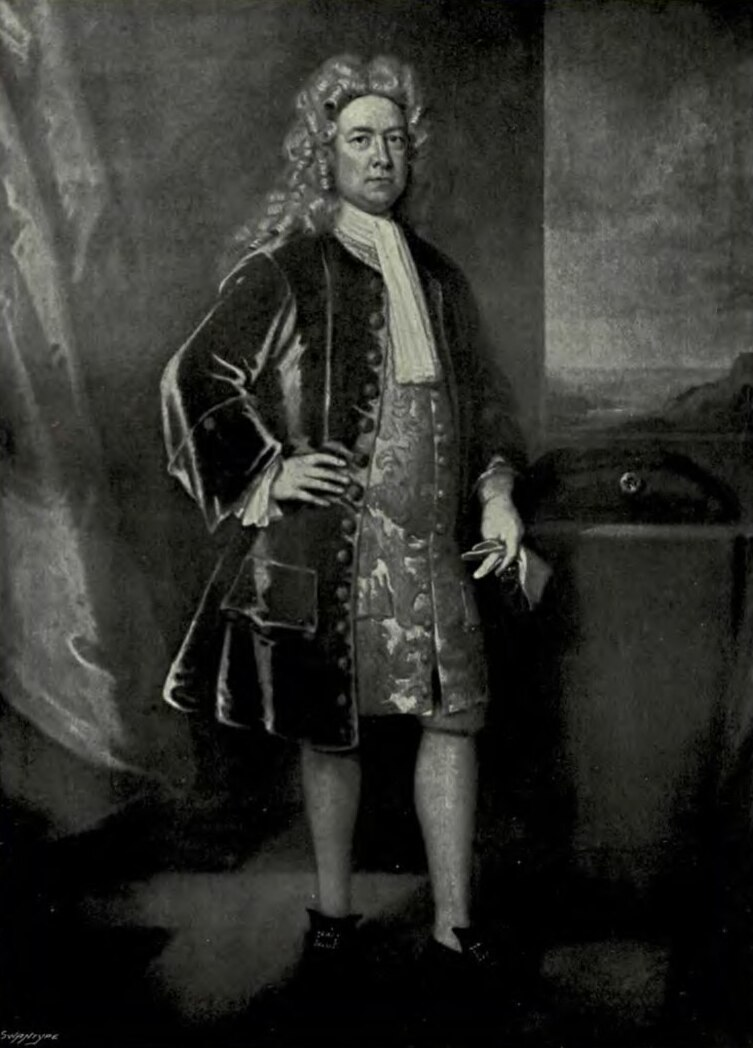
- Portrait by Sir Godfrey Kneller

President of Fort St. George
- In office 7 July 1698 – 18 September 1709
- Preceded by: Nathaniel Higginson
- Succeeded by: Gulston Addison

Personal details
- Born: 5 July 1653 Blandford Forum, Dorset, England
- Died: 28 April 1726 (aged 72)
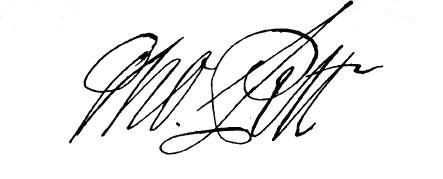
- Signature

Arms of Pitt: Sable, a fesse chequy argent and azure between three bezants

Thomas Pitt (5 July 1653 – 28 April 1726) was a British merchant, colonial administrator and politician who served as the president of Fort St. George from 1698 to 1709. Born in Blandford Forum, Dorset, he eventually went to the Indian subcontinent in the service of the English East India Company (EIC) and rose to a senior position in the Presidency of Fort St. George, administering the EIC's affairs within the region. After a lucrative career in India, Pitt returned to England and entered into a political career, being elected six times to the Parliament of Great Britain. His descendants would go on to found a political dynasty, with Pitt's grandson and great-grandson both serving as Prime Minister of Great Britain.

== Early life ==
Pitt was born at Blandford Forum, Dorset, the second son of Rev. John Pitt (1610–1672), Rector of Blandford St Mary (whose mural monument survives in that church), by his wife Sarah Jay. His second cousin was the poet Rev. Christopher Pitt (1699–1748) whose mural monument survives in the church of St Peter and St Paul, Blandford Forum, displaying the arms of Pitt: Sable, a fesse chequy argent and azure between three bezants. The earliest prominent ancestor of his family was John Pitt (died 1602) a mercer from Blandford Forum and Clerk of the Exchequer who received a grant of arms, from whose younger son, Thomas Pitt of Blandford (father of Rev. John Pitt), the Pitts of Boconnoc were descended. The eldest son of John Pitt (died 1602) was Sir William Pitt (c. 1559 – 1636), MP for Wareham, who founded the senior line of Pitt of Stratfield Saye in Hampshire, many of whose descendants served as an MP for Wareham and in 1776 acquired the title Baron Rivers.

== In the Mughal Empire ==
In 1674, Pitt went to India with the East India Company, and soon began trading for himself as an "interloper" in defiance of the East India Company's legal monopoly on Indian trade. Upon his return to England, he was fined £400 for his actions, although by that time he was already very wealthy and could easily afford the fine. He then proceeded to buy the manor of Stratford, Wiltshire and its surrounding borough of Old Sarum. With that acquisition he gained a seat in the House of Commons, as it was a rotten borough, although his first seat was as the member for Salisbury in the Convention Parliament of 1689. The purchase of Old Sarum would have a significant effect on English history, as the seat would pass to Pitt's rather influential descendants. Pitt returned to India and eventually was hired by the East India Company.

In August 1698, Pitt arrived at Madras as the President of the East India Company and was entrusted to negotiate an end to the Child's War with the Mughal Emperor Aurangzeb. In August 1699, he had been appointed as the Governor of Fort St. George and in the same year helped the Danes defeat Tanjore. In 1702, when the fort was besieged by Daud Khan of the Carnatic, the Mughal Empire's local subedar (lieutenant), Pitt was instructed to seek peace. He later bought out some of the Carnatic region. He began garrisoning East India Company forts by raising regiments of local sepoys by hiring from Hindu warrior castes, arming them with the latest weapons and deploying them under the command of English officers to save Madras, his base of operations, from further Mughal harassment.

== President of Madras ==
These native governors (Subedars and Nawabs) have the knack of tramping upon us and extorting what they please of our estate from us...they will never forbid doing so till we have made them sensible of our power.

— Thomas Pitt (1699)

Pitt became the President of Madras on 7 July 1698 and remained in his post till 1709.

In 1698, a new company called English Company Trading to the East Indies was floated by English merchants with Whiggish affiliations with a capital of £2 million. In August 1699, one John Pitt arrived at Madras and claimed that he had been appointed as the Governor of Fort St George by the new Company on behalf of the Stuarts. However, the Government in England passed an order that the authorities were to receive orders from no-one save those appointed by King William III.

On 4 December 1700, the Government of Fort St George banned cock-fighting and other traditional games, regarding it as the foremost reason for the poverty of the inhabitants of Madras.

Pitt's term of office is known as the 'Golden Age of Madras'. He fortified the walls of Black Town and organised an accurate survey of the city. Pitt is best known for the acquisition of the Five New Towns: Tiruvatiyoor, Kathiwakam, Nungambakkam, Vyasarpady and Sathangadu.

== Later career ==
In need of money after making gifts to his family, he gave up his seat in parliament in 1716 in favour of the position of governor of Jamaica. However, his finances were restored by the sale of a large diamond (later known as the Regent Diamond) and he resigned the position the following year without ever going there. He was soon re-elected to parliament to represent Thirsk, and thereafter Old Sarum for the last time, finally quitting parliament in 1726.

== Marriage and children ==
On 1 January 1679/80 Pitt married Jane Innes, a daughter of James Innes of Reid Hall, Moray, by his wife Sarah Vincent. Jane was a niece of Matthias Vincent, one of Pitt's business associates. By his wife he had at least four sons and two daughters, including:

- Robert Pitt (1680–1727), of Boconnoc, eldest son, the father of William Pitt, 1st Earl of Chatham (1708–1778) ("Pitt the Elder"), Prime Minister of Great Britain, the father of William Pitt the Younger (1759–1806), also Prime Minister.
- Thomas Pitt, 1st Earl of Londonderry (c. 1688 – 1729), 2nd son, a twin with his fractionally younger brother William, based on an entry to the baptismal records of St Lawrence, Stratford-sub-Castle, Wiltshire.
- William Pitt, 3rd son, a twin who probably died in infancy.
- Col. John Pitt (1698–1754), 4th son, a distinguished soldier.
- Essex Pitt, eldest daughter, who married Charles Cholmondeley (1684–1759).
- Lucy Pitt, 2nd daughter, who married James Stanhope, 1st Earl Stanhope, a soldier and statesmen who served as chief minister during the early years of the reign of King George I.

== Pitt's diamond ==
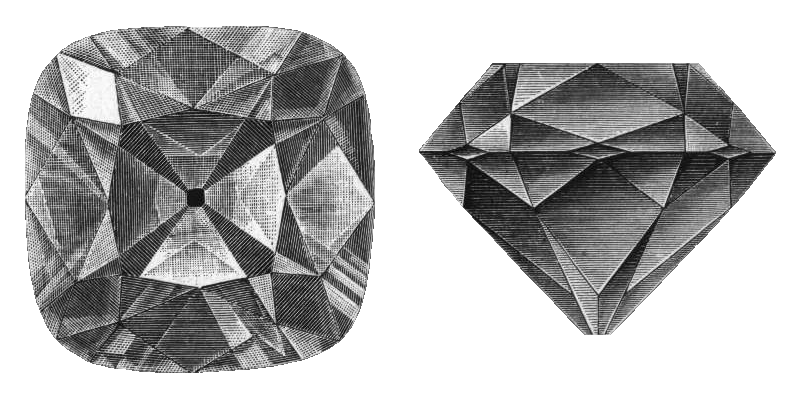
The Regent Diamond, now on display in the Louvre

Pitt purchased a 410-carat (82 g) uncut diamond from an Indian merchant named Jamchand in Madras in 1701. According to legend, the diamond had been originally found by an enslaved man in the Kollur Mine near the Krishna River and was concealed by the slave in a leg wound, which he suffered while fleeing the siege of Golconda. The slave then made to the Indian coast, where he met an English sea captain and offered him 50% of all profits made on the sale of the diamond in exchange for safe passage out of India. However, the sea captain killed the slave and sold the diamond to Jamchand.

Pitt bought the diamond for 48,000 pagodas or £20,400, and sent it back to England in 1702 concealed inside his eldest son Robert's shoe. For two years from 1704–1706, the jeweller Harris laboured in London to hew a 141-carat (28.2 g) cushion brilliant from the rough stone. Several secondary stones were produced from the cut that were sold to Tsar Peter the Great of Russia. After many attempts to sell it to various European royals, including Louis XIV of France, Pitt and his sons went with the diamond to Calais in 1717. With John Law acting as agent, it was sold that year to the French regent, Philippe II, Duke of Orléans, for £135,000, becoming one of the crown jewels of France. Today, "Le Régent", as it came to be known, remains in the French Royal Treasury at the Louvre, where it has been on display since 1887.

Pitt owned a piece of land called a copyhold, and the lord of this land was entitled to Pitt's most valuable possession after his death. If he had not sold the diamond, it would have been confiscated as a heriot, a form of death duty.

His association with the jewel earned him the nickname "Diamond" Pitt.

== Properties ==
Pitt took a lease in 1686 on Mawarden (or Marwarden) Court, at Stratford-sub-Castle north of Salisbury, and bought lands in the area which were within Old Sarum borough. His descendants would continue as lessees until 1805. A bold inscription on the tower of St Lawrence's church, next to the house, records that he paid for the tower to be rebuilt in 1711; and he also provided furnishings and plate for the church.

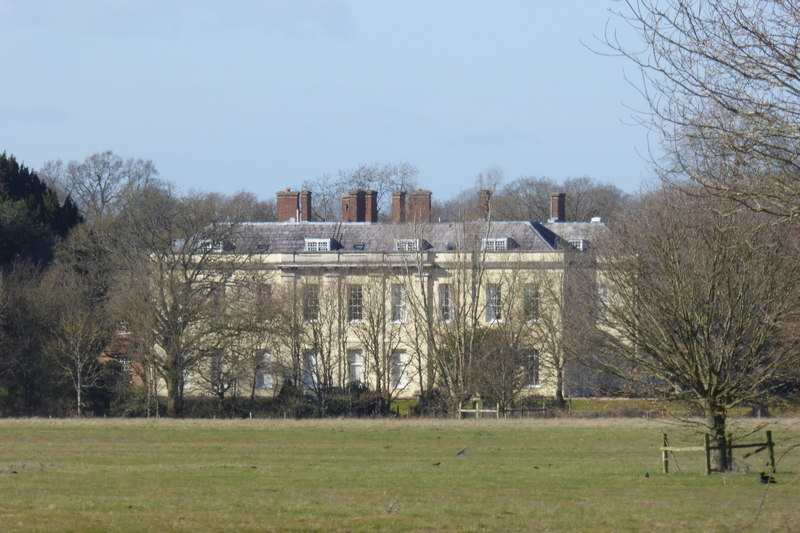
Swallowfield

With the money received in 1717 for his famous diamond, he began to consolidate his properties. Besides Mawarden Court and the Down at Blandford, he acquired Boconnoc in Cornwall from Lord Mohun's widow in 1717, and subsequently Kynaston in Dorset, Bradock, Treskillard and Brannell in Cornwall, Woodyates on the border of Dorset and Wiltshire, Abbot's Ann in Hampshire (where he rebuilt the church) and, subsequently his favourite residence, Swallowfield Park in Berkshire, where he died in 1726.

== Sources ==
- Moore, Gloria. The Anglo-Indian Vision, 1986.
- Palmer, R.R., et al. A History of the Modern World, 2004.

Parliament of England
Preceded by Thomas Hoby; Giles Eyre	Member of Parliament for Salisbury; 1689–1695; With: Thomas Hoby	Succeeded by Thomas Hoby; Sir Thomas Mompesson
Parliament of Great Britain
Preceded by Robert Pitt; William Harvey	Member of Parliament for Old Sarum; 1710–1716; With: William Harvey 1710–13; Robert Pitt 1713–16	Succeeded by Robert Pitt; Sir William Strickland
Preceded by Ralph Bell; Thomas Frankland	Member of Parliament for Thirsk; 1717–1722; With: Thomas Frankland	Succeeded by Thomas Frankland; William St Quintin
Preceded by Robert Pitt; Sir William Strickland	Member of Parliament for Old Sarum; 1722–1726; With: Robert Pitt 1722; George Morton Pitt 1722–24; John Pitt 1724–26	Succeeded by John Pitt; George Pitt
Political offices
Preceded by Nathaniel Higginson	President of Madras; 7 July 1698 – 18 September 1709	Succeeded by Gulston Addison
Government offices
Preceded by Lord Archibald Hamilton	Governor of Jamaica; 1716–1717	Succeeded by Peter Heywood
