= Thomas Chambers (colonial administrator) =

English colonial administrator (died 1692)

Sir Thomas Chambers

Agent of Fort St George (Madras)
- In office 1658 – 1661 or 1662
- Preceded by: Thomas Greenhill
- Succeeded by: Sir Edward Winter

Sir Thomas Chambers (or Chamber; died 1692) was an English administrator and factor of the Honourable East India Company who served as the Agent of Madras from 1658 to 1661 or 1662. His family background is reported as Wolsty in Cumberland.

== Tenure as Agent of Madras ==
As soon as Thomas Chambers became an Agent, he was instructed by the authorities in England to make decisions based on a majority vote and not on his private discretion. In the case of a stalemate, the Agent was allowed to cast the deciding vote.

== Later life and family ==
In 1670 Chambers bought the park and manor of Hanworth, Middlesex, from the heir of Francis Cottington, 1st Baron Cottington. His son Thomas (1677–1750) married Mary Berkeley, daughter of Charles Berkeley, 2nd Earl of Berkeley. In the next generation Mary Chambers, heiress to Sir Thomas, married Vere Beauclerk, 1st Baron Vere.

Preceded by Thomas Greenhill	Agent of Madras; 1658–1661	Succeeded by Sir Edward Winter
