= John Pitt (British Army officer) =

British soldier and politician

John Pitt (1698–1754) was a British Army officer, colonial administrator and politician who sat in the House of Commons between 1720 and 1734.

Pitt was the youngest son of Governor Thomas "Diamond" Pitt who made a fortune while in India and returned to Britain to found a political dynasty. He attended Eton College, and went into the army where he rose to the rank of lieutenant colonel and served as an aide-de-camp to George I.

Pitt served as Member of Parliament for Hindon from 1720 to 1722, Old Sarum from 1724 to 1726 and Camelford from 1727 to 1734. From 1728 to 1737 he served as Governor of Bermuda.

Pitt was cut out of his father's will after a dispute. He was the brother-in-law of James Stanhope, 1st Earl Stanhope, the effective Prime Minister between 1717 and 1721, and the uncle of William Pitt. He was married to Mary Belasyse, the daughter of the Viscount Fauconberg.

== Bibliography ==
- Black, Jeremy. Pitt the Elder. Cambridge University Press, 1992.
- Brown, Peter Douglas. William Pitt, Earl of Chatham: The Great Commoner. George Allen & Unwin, 1978.

Parliament of Great Britain
Preceded by Reynolds Calthorpe; George Wade	Member of Parliament for Hindon; 1720–1722; With: George Wade	Succeeded by Henry Ludlow Coker; Robert Gray
Preceded by George Morton Pitt; Thomas Pitt	Member of Parliament for Old Sarum; 1724–1727; With: Thomas Pitt 1724–1726; George Pitt 1726–1727	Succeeded by Thomas Pitt of Boconnoc; The Earl of Londonderry
Preceded by The Earl of Drogheda; William Sloper	Member of Parliament for Camelford; 1727–1734; With: Thomas Hales	Succeeded by Thomas Lyttelton; James Cholmondeley
