= Stratford-sub-Castle =

Coordinates: 51.090°N 1.812°W

Stratford sub Castle
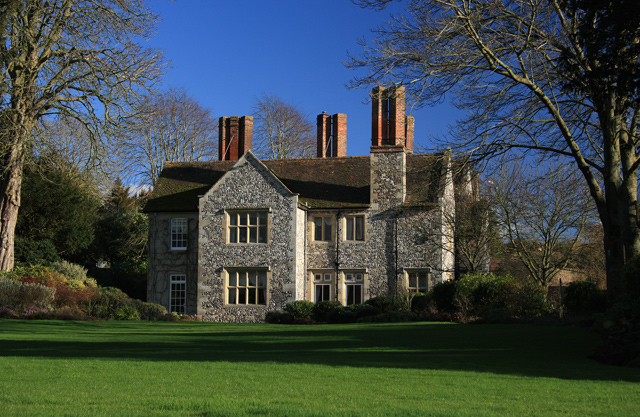
- The Manor House, Stratford sub Castle

- Location within Wiltshire
- OS grid reference: SU133323
- Civil parish: Salisbury
- Unitary authority: Wiltshire
- Ceremonial county: Wiltshire
- Region: South West
- Country: England
- Sovereign state: United Kingdom
- Post town: SALISBURY
- Postcode district: SP1
- Dialling code: 01722
- Police: Wiltshire
- Fire: Dorset and Wiltshire
- Ambulance: South Western
- UK Parliament: Salisbury
- Website: Community website

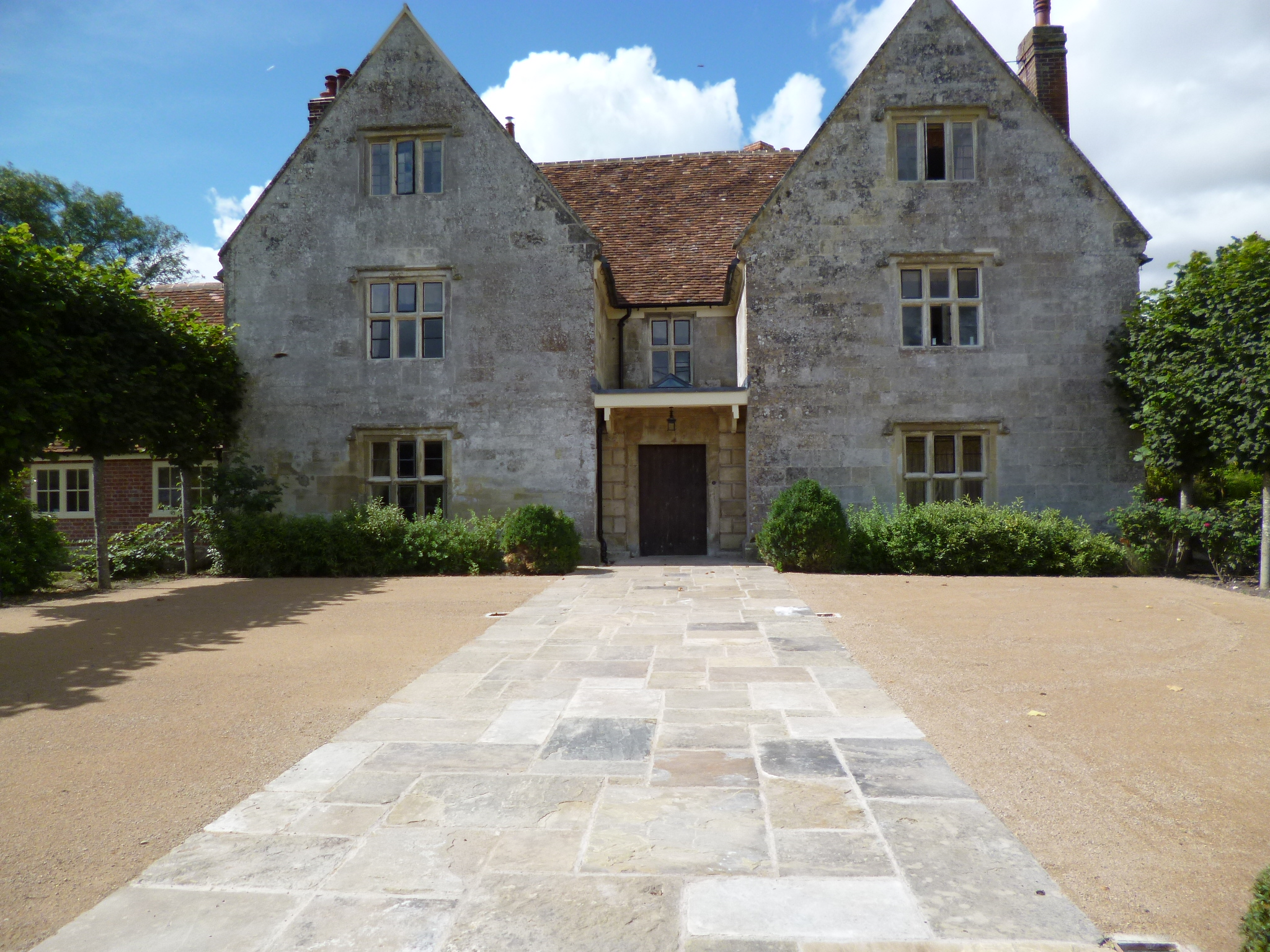
Mawarden Court, Stratford sub Castle

Stratford sub Castle in Wiltshire, England, was anciently a separate village and civil parish, but is now in Salisbury. At approximately 170 ft above sea level, it is dominated to the east by the remains of an Iron Age hillfort, within the boundaries of which a Norman castle was built. This now-ruined castle led to the village taking the name Stratford under Castle, later changing to Stratford sub Castle. Stratford lies south-west of the abandoned medieval settlement of Old Sarum which was also built within the area of the hillfort.

The oldest building in the area is the Church of St Lawrence, which dates from the 13th century and is a Grade I listed building. The west tower was restored by Thomas Pitt in 1711. A section of the churchyard contains war graves from World War I and World War II that are looked after by the Commonwealth War Graves Commission. Before his conversion to Roman Catholicism, the hymnist Edward Caswall served as a curate.

In 1951 the civil parish had a population of 256. On 1 April 1954 the parish was abolished: the village and the site of Old Sarum were brought within the city, and the rest was merged with Laverstock.

Stratford sub Castle cannot expand to the east or the west, being bounded by Old Sarum on one side and the River Avon on the other: it has thus become a linear settlement. There is a primary school; the nearest secondary school to the village is South Wilts Grammar School, a five-minute walk away from the southern boundary of Stratford sub Castle, on Stratford Road.

== Areas within the ward ==
Stratford sub Castle is in the St Francis and Stratford ward. Arguably the boundary between the two is the A345 road with Stratford sub castle to the west and St Francis to the east. Nowadays, the two areas are prosperous, largely residential suburbs north of the A36 road. The ward of St Francis and Stratford is the least ethnically diverse ward in Salisbury being 94.5% White British in 2011, out of the ward's population which was 5,586.

Also within the ward is the suburb of Paul's Dene which is a housing estate and terminus of a Salisbury Reds bus route. Paul's Dene is on the northern edge of Salisbury, being north-east of Stratford-sub-castle and north of St Francis. Main amenities in the ward are Hudson's Field, Old Sarum historic monument, Mawarden Court, Victoria Park and Five Rivers leisure centre.

A historical feature formerly within the area was the recently demolished Salisbury gasholder on Coldharbour Lane, to the north of the A36 Salisbury ring road. Built in 1928, it was taken apart in 2017 by Southern Gas because of high maintenance costs and some local residents considering it an eyesore.

The ruins of Old Sarum, managed by English Heritage, lie within the boundaries of Stratford sub Castle. A modern housing and industrial development, confusingly also known as Old Sarum, is further to the east and outside the Salisbury city boundary.
