= George Foxcroft =

Agent of Fort St George (Madras)
- Preceded by: Edward Winter
- Succeeded by: William Langhorn

Personal details
- Born: c. 1634
- Died: 26 February 1715

George Foxcroft (c. 1634−26 February 1715) was the ninth administrator of the colony of Madras in British India for two terms starting from August 1665 to 16 September 1665 and 22 August 1668 to January 1670. During the rule of his predecessor, Sir Edward Winter, he was imprisoned on suspicion of having made utterances against King Charles II. However, when his term came to an end, he took over as the British East India Company's Agent and was the first to be given the title "Governor of Fort St George". The company's letter constituting the Madras Agent and Council "Our Governor and Agent and Consul in Fort St George" and empowering them to execute judgment in all cases, civil and criminal, was occasioned by the difficulty that arose as to the jurisdiction of the Madras officials over capital cases. This difficulty was solved by the new title and "to modern occupants of the gubernatorial chair it is probably unknown that they owe their designation to a Madras murder."

Preceded by Sir Edward Winter	Agent of Madras; August 1665 – September 1665	Succeeded by Sir Edward Winter
Preceded by Sir Edward Winter	Agent of Madras (Restored); 22 May 1668 – January 1670	Succeeded by William Langhorn
