= Thomas Greenhill (colonial administrator) =

English colonial administrator (1611/12–1658)

Agent of Fort St George (Madras)
- In office 1644, 1652 – 1648, 1655
- Preceded by: Thomas Ivie, Aaron Baker
- Succeeded by: Aaron Baker, Thomas Chambers

Personal details
- Born: c. 1611 or 1612
- Died: 4 January 1658 (aged 46–47)

Thomas Greenhill (1611/12 – 4 January 1658) was an English colonial administrator, one of the early pioneers of the East India Company and the Agent of Madras for two terms from 1648 to 1652 and 1655 to 1658.

== Early life ==
Greenhill arrived in India in 1632 to serve in the company's Masulipatnam factory. During the agency of Thomas Ivie, Greenhill was sent on a mission to the Raja of Chandragiri which resulted in the issue of a new grant in October/November 1645. By this grant, the Raja confirmed an older grant and ceded the village of Narikamedu to the company.

== Tenure as Agent of Madras ==
Madras was in the grips of a famine (the first famine since the start of British rule in Madras) when Greenhill became Agent in 1648. In September 1648, Greenhill arranged for rice to shipped aboard the ship Blessing from Persia. These fears were, however, short-lived as Madras had completely recovered from the famine by April 1649.

Greenhill's tenure as Agent of Madras was marked by a scandal. A certain Mr. Thomas and Elizabeth Bland laid a charge against Greenhill, that the Agent had fathered an illegitimate child on Elizabeth, whom he had compelled to undergo an abortion in the fifth month of her pregnancy. The charge caused damage to Greenhill's reputation. Later, however, during the course of a trial, Elizabeth admitted that the accusation was false, and made in order to profit by the criminal case against Greenhill.

== Death ==
Greenhill died in Madras of excessive drinking on 4 January 1658. His is the oldest English tombstone yet discovered in Madras city.

Preceded by Thomas Ivie	Agent of Madras; 1648–1652	Succeeded by Aaron Baker; President
Preceded by Aaron Baker; President	Agent of Madras; 1655–1658	Succeeded by Thomas Chambers
