= Nathaniel Elwick =

British merchant

President of Fort St. George, Madras
- In office 15 October 1721 – 15 January 1725
- Preceded by: Francis Hastings
- Succeeded by: James Macrae

Personal details
- Born: 1675
- Died: 1750 (aged 74–75)
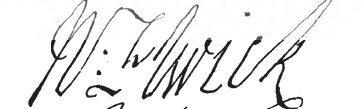
- Signature

Nathaniel Elwick (February 1675 – 1750) was a British merchant who served as the President of Fort St. George from 15 October 1721 to 15 January 1725.

== Early life ==
Nathaniel Elwick was born to John Elwick and Judith Crisp. He was baptized on 13 February 1675 and completed his schooling at Merchant Taylor's School in London.

== Envoy to China ==
Both of Nathaniel's brothers, Thomas Elwick and John Elwick, were Directors of the British East India Company. Nathaniel was sent to China in 1713 as an official envoy.

== Governor of Madras ==
Two months from the commencement of Elwick's tenure, his predecessor Francis Hastings died. Hastings' dubash Mar Kistna was arrested on 8 September 1722 on charges of extortion and non-payment of debts. He was imprisoned in Fort St. George until 11 December 1722 and released only when he had settled his debts.

The privileged Armenian community of Madras carried out a flourishing trade with the French settlement of Puducherry. However, this trade was forbidden by Elwick and he considered any sort of foreign trade as detrimental to the interests of the British East India Company.

Cheen Kulich Khan, the Nizam of Hyderabad, defeated the Nawab of the Carnatic in June 1724 and proceeded towards Gingee, causing severe apprehensions among the British authorities in Madras. The same month, the Afghans laid siege to the town of Shiraz in Persia, effectively cutting off the supply of Madeira wine to the factory of Madras.
