= Edward Winter (English administrator) =

English administrator (died 1686)

Sir Edward Winter
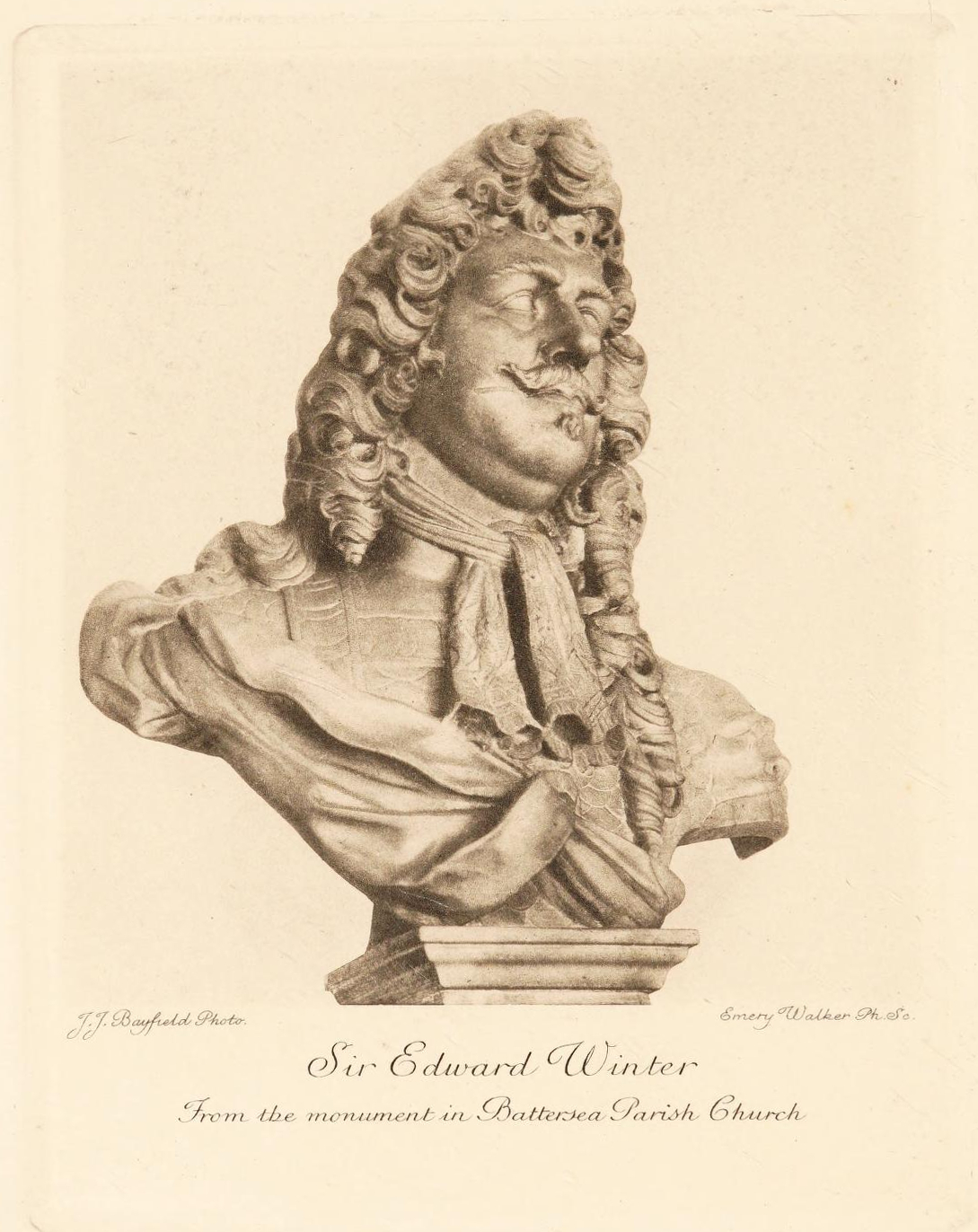

Agent of Fort St George (Madras)
- Preceded by: Thomas Chambers
- Succeeded by: George Foxcroft

Personal details
- Born: c. 1622
- Died: c. 1686

Sir Edward Winter (1622?–1686) was an English administrator employed by the East India Company (EIC).

== Life ==
The son of William Winter and great-grandson of Admiral Sir William Winter, he was born in 1622 or 1623, and went to India about 1630, probably under the charge of an elder brother, Thomas, who was chief of the Masulipatnam factory in 1647. In 1655 Edward Winter was appointed to the same post, but three years later he was dismissed, whereupon he returned to England, reaching London in the summer of 1660. He had amassed a considerable fortune, and, as he brought home his wife and family, he probably had no intention of going again to the east. The East India Company, however, in reorganising their affairs upon the grant of their new charter (1661), needed the services of an energetic man versed in the affairs of the Coromandel Coast, and were willing to forget their former grievances against his private trading. Accordingly, by a commission dated 20 February 1661–2, Winter (who had been knighted at Whitehall on the 13th of that month) was appointed the eighth agent at Fort St. George on an agreement to serve for three years from the date of his arrival (22 September 1662).

During his tenure, he obtained permanent agreement regarding the English rights over Madras. However, soon he aroused the ire of the local factors by allegedly adopting a threatening attitude against the Sultan of Golconda in response to the extravagant duties imposed by the former. He complained about the irregularity of the duties to a Naik of the Sultan of Golconda who responded by saying that "when the English horns and teeth grew, then he would free them from their duties". Soon afterwards, Winter was accused of private trade by the factors of the EIC who referred the matter to the company's directors. Winter offered to vacate his seat, supremely confident that the directors would not accept his resignation. However, his resignation was accepted and George Foxcroft was appointed as the Agent in his place.

Foxcroft was the opposite of Winter in character and personality. While Winter was a man of good integrity, Foxcroft was not. Ultimately, disputes broke out between the two, and three months later, Winter attacked Foxcroft, his son and one Mr. Sambroke. Foxcroft and Sambroke were arrested and kept in confinement for sedition. Winter assumed command of the garrison at Fort St. George and wrote to the king of England and the Archbishop of Canterbury explaining his action as a measure against the puritanical and anti-Royalist activities of Foxcroft. Foxcroft, meanwhile, appealed to the Agent of Masulipatnam and the President of Surat, as well as the Sultan of Golconda for help. The authorities at Masulipatnam and Surat as well as the Directors of the Company remonstrated with Winter but nothing came of it. The directors came to the conclusion that Winter had sided with the Dutch and when peace was concluded with the Dutch under the Treaty of Breda on 10 May 1668, threats were issued for a British invasion of Fort St. George and the adjoining Portuguese town of St. Thome. However, Edward Winter was adamant under the assumption that the King of England supported him. On 21 May 1668 two ships belonging to the Company arrived at Madras and arrested two members of the Council of Fort St George whom Winter had sent to negotiate with the Company troops. Winter was issued an ultimatum in the name of the King of England and he surrendered and George Foxcroft was reinstated. However, within a year of the reinstatement, Foxcroft as well as Winter were asked to leave for England. George Foxcroft, who was the first to be given the title 'Governor of Fort St. George'.

== Personal life ==
Winter was twice married. His first wife, whom he married in the East Indies, was Mary Potter, daughter of Mr William Potter; she was born in East Indies, and the House of Commons journal records her naturalisation as an English subject in 1661. His second wife, whom he married on 20 December 1682, was Emma Withe or Wyeth, widow, daughter of Richard Howe of Norfolk. His will mentions a son Edward and two daughters, married in the East Indies, who apparently predeceased him.

Preceded by Sir Thomas Chambers	Agent of Madras; 1661 – August 1665	Succeeded by George Foxcroft
Preceded by George Foxcroft	Agent of Madras (Restored); September 1665 – 22 May 1668	Succeeded by George Foxcroft
