= Elihu Yale =

British colonial administrator and namesake of Yale College

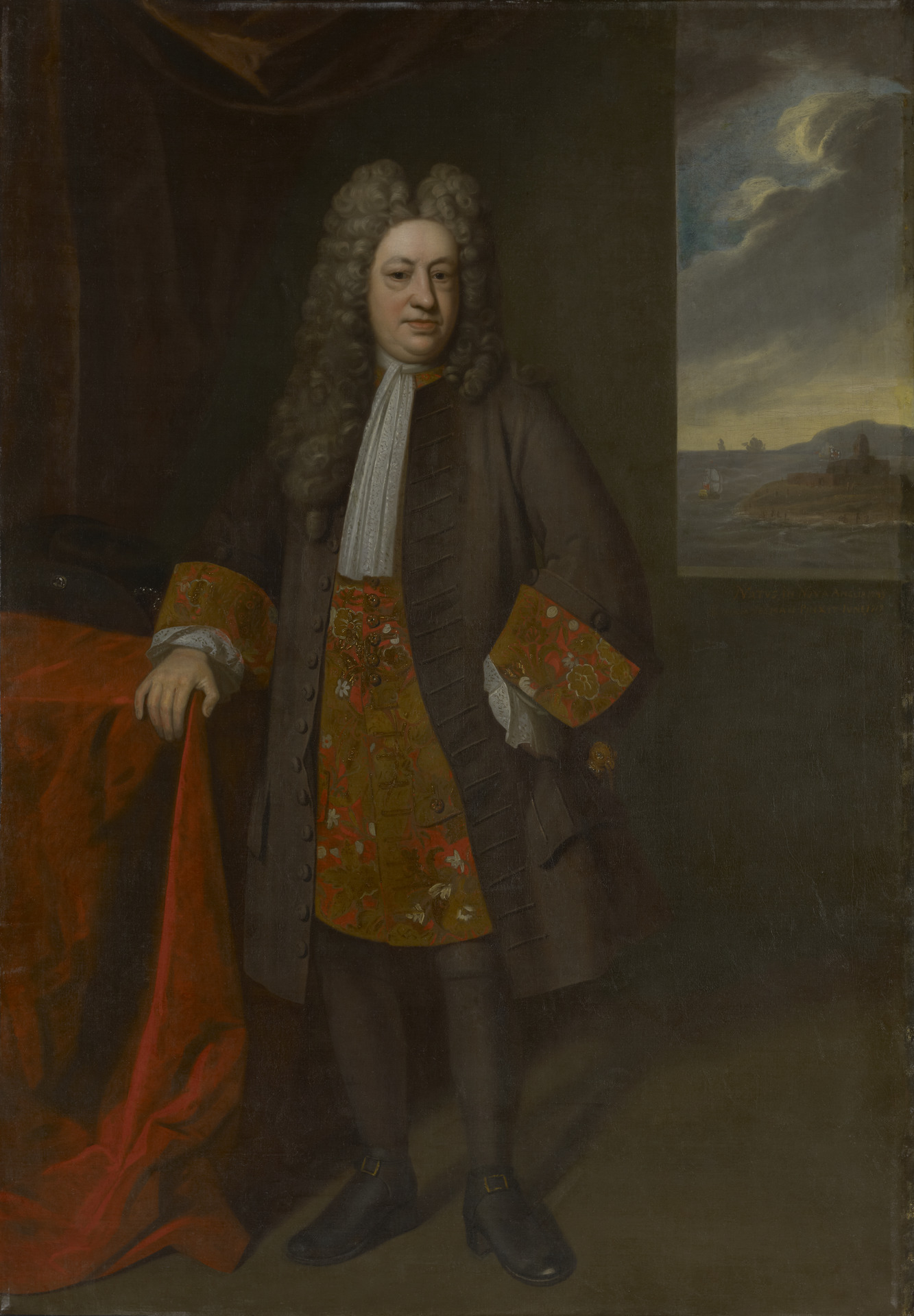
- Portrait by Enoch Seeman, 1717

President of Fort St. George
- In office 25 July 1687 – 3 October 1692
- Preceded by: William Gyfford
- Succeeded by: Nathaniel Higginson
- In office 8 August 1684 – 26 January 1685
- Preceded by: William Gyfford (Agent)
- Succeeded by: William Gyfford

Personal details
- Born: 5 April 1649 Boston, Colony of Massachusetts
- Died: 8 July 1721 (aged 72) London, England
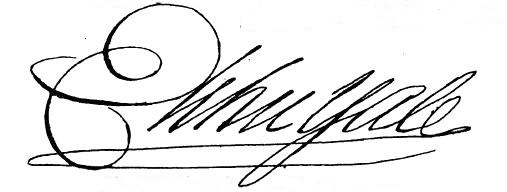
- Signature

Elihu Yale (5 April 1649 – 8 July 1721) was a British colonial administrator. Born in Boston, Massachusetts Bay Colony, Yale lived in America only as a child, and spent the rest of his life in England, Wales, and India. He became a clerk for the East India Company at Fort St. George, later Madras, and eventually rose to the Presidency of the settlement. He was later removed from the post under charges of corruption for self-dealing, and required to pay a fine. In 1699, he returned to Britain with a considerable fortune, around £200,000 (equivalent to £32.2 million in 2025), mostly made by selling diamonds, and spent his time and wealth in philanthropy and art collecting.

He was the primary benefactor of Yale College, now Yale University, which was named in his honor, following a donation of books, portraits, and textiles at the request of Rev. Cotton Mather, a Harvard University graduate. He had no male heir, and no descendants of his have survived past his grandchildren. In the 21st century, Yale's connections to slavery in India began to be more closely explored, a process assisted by the digitalisation and online publication of the East India Company's records. In 2020, Peter Salovey, president of Yale University, launched the Yale and Slavery Research Project to explore the university's historical links with slavery and colonialism, including Elihu Yale's role.

== Early life ==
Yale was born in Boston, Massachusetts, to David Yale (1613–1690), a wealthy Boston merchant and attorney to Robert Rich, 2nd Earl of Warwick, and Ursula Knight; he was the grandson of Anne Yale (born Lloyd), daughter of Bishop George Lloyd. After the death of her first husband, Thomas Yale Sr. (1587–1619), son of Chancellor David Yale, Anne Yale married Theophilus Eaton, ambassador to Denmark. Eaton was the co-founder of two of the Thirteen British Colonies, which are represented on the Flag of the United States, mainly through the Massachusetts Bay Colony and the New Haven Colony, and was the brother of Nathaniel Eaton, Harvard's first Headmaster and President designate, at the founding of Harvard in 1636.

His son, Samuel Eaton, the uncle of Elihu, was also involved in the foundation of Harvard, being one of the seven founder members of the Harvard Corporation, the governing board and charter that incorporated the college in 1650. It was they, along with Elihu's uncle and aunt, Thomas Yale Jr., and Anne Yale Jr., who brought the reconstituted Eaton/Yale family to America, while other members of the family stayed in England. Their estates in Wales were Plas-yn-Yale and Plas Grono, and Elihu's brother was London merchant Thomas Yale, later ambassador to the King of Siam for the East India Company.

Elihu's father, David Yale, would later come from London to New Haven Colony with his stepfather, Theophilus Eaton, in 1639. He moved to Boston in 1641 and met and married Elihu Yale's mother, Ursula, in 1643. In 1652, at the age of three, Elihu Yale left New England, as David Yale took his family back to London. While documentation of this period is sparse, a letter suggests that David Yale remained a successful merchant and settled his family in the Hanseatic merchant district "Steelyard Court". In 1662, at the age of thirteen, Elihu Yale entered the private school of William Dugard, but Dugard died a few months after Elihu Yale enrolled. Yale likely lived through the Great Plague of London and the Great Fire of London.

== East India Company ==
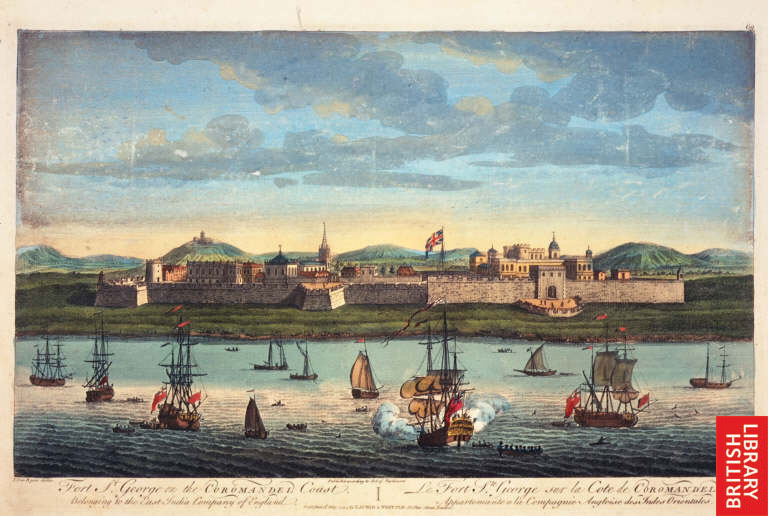
Seaview of Fort St. George, the East India Company's headquarters in Madras, 1700s

In 1670, Yale joined the British East India Company, starting as a clerk at East India House in London. Among the board was the Earl of Berkeley, Sir Samuel Barnardiston, Vice-Admiral John Robinson, and Chairman Sir Andrew Riccard. Yale's uncle, Connecticut Gov. Edward Hopkins, was also one of the shareholders. It is possible that Yale had business training in his father's merchant counting house beforehand. He then sailed to India in December 1671 on one of the East Indiamen, on a voyage that would take six months, with the eminent dangers of pirates, storms and diseases.

He landed in Madras on 23 June 1672, at Fort St. George, where Portuguese, English and Hindu lived. He then learned the rules of Gov. William Langhorne, some of which being the interdiction to start a duel, to desert the fort, or to blaspheme, and met with Father Ephrem de Nevers. At the time, the East India Company was already exporting to Europe spices, pepper, precious stones, Chinese porcelains, Japanese screens, and cotton cloth. In 1674, Yale was sent to negotiate the potential establishment of a new factory, and by February, was allowed to deal in private trade, which included pearls, diamonds, rubies, sapphires, neckcloths, cloves and nutmegs. By 1677, Gov. Langhorne was accused of corruption by competitors within the Company. The directors were always suspicious, and with huge fortune being made six months away from London, they easily mistrust their employees.

He was then replaced by Gov. Streynsham Master, the son-in-law of Richard Legh of Lyme Hall. In April 1678, Yale was promoted to the rank of Factor, doubling his salary. In June arrived the Welsh chaplain John Evans, future Bishop of Meath, who would become a lifelong friend. In 1679, Yale's duties now involved receiving and invoicing textiles worth about 100,000 pagodas, consisting of neckcloths, chintz, and longcloth of various grades. With the death of Joseph Hynmers, second-in-command, Yale was made Assistant to the Warehouse Keeper, and started courting his widow. They married at St. Mary's Church, the oldest Anglican Church in India, on 4 November 1680, with Sir Henry Oxenden, Governor of Bombay, as brideman. With his wife's capital, Yale learned the trade and became a specialist in diamonds and precious stones.

=== Madras Council ===
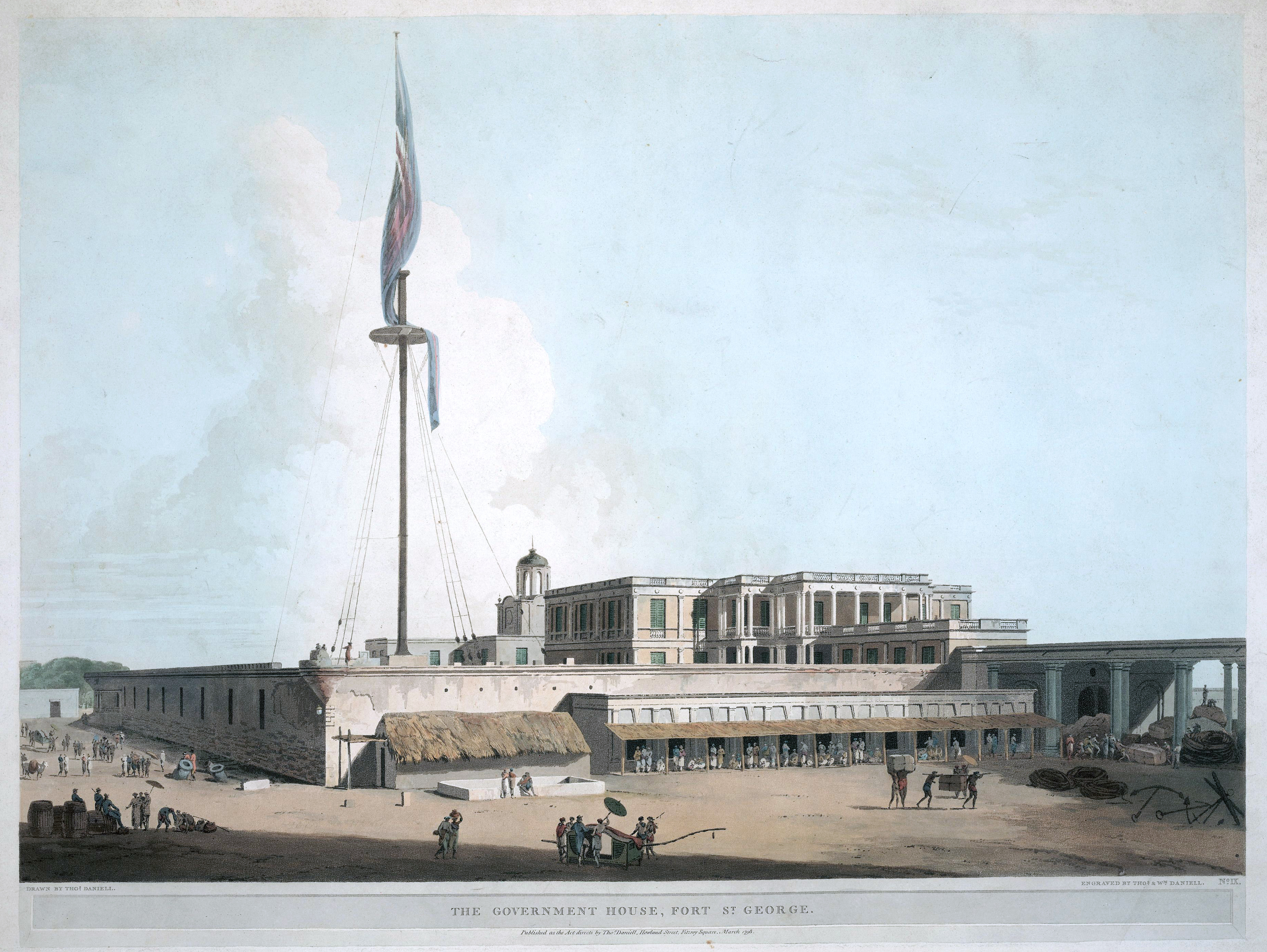
The Government House at Fort St. George, seat of the Madras Presidency, where Yale would spend 29 years of his career

In January 1681, he was promoted to the office of Provisional Customer. In the same year, Gov. Streynsham Master was replaced by William Gyfford, and Yale was sent as a diplomat to meet the VOC Governor of Pulicat. Despite Master's loyalty, the directors once again believed the charges of bad management, fueled by enemies, who brought complaints after complaints to the board in London. According to Madras historian Arthur Pringle, the official records are full of invented circumstantial charges of injustice and fraud. Yale was then promoted to the office of Mintmaster, and was given a seat on the council, occupying the fifth position on a board of six, as the directors were "pleased with Elihu's behavior and ability". In 1682, he was sent to Porto Novo on the Coromandel Coast to find investment opportunities for the sale of longcloth. During his mission, a great storm struck the coast, and 14,000 persons died. He made assessments of harbor facilities and fortifications, and was welcomed with coconuts as gifts of diplomacy.

Yale then negotiated with Sikandar Shah, the Sultan of Bijapur, and obtained permission for the gold trade in his territory. In 1683, as a member of Gov. Gyfford's council, he became a cofounder of the Madras Bank, the oldest in India. On 12 February, the second-in-command was dismissed for his "language that was too independent and not sufficiently subservient in his letters". The Councilmen rose in rank, with Yale becoming Warehouse Keeper. When Gov. Gyfford was sent to inspect factories in the Bay of Bengal, Yale became acting governor for a few months, and procured three elephants from King Narai of Siam, to be sent to the Sultan of Gingee as war elephants. In peace time, they were used with a Howdah as status symbols, while at war, they were the prototypes of the modern tank. Yale then obtained a house and garden at St. Thomas Mount for the sickly and their convalesce. Thereafter, he received 3 princes from Sumatra, Indonesia, bringing a letter from Sultanah Inayat Syah, Queen of Acheen, resulting in a trade agreement. About this time, King Charles II of England died, with James II ascending to the throne. The change was well welcomed by the company, as the chairman, Sir Josiah Child, had spent a fortune on James's ascension. Yale then organized the official ceremony at Fort St. George, with Gov. Gyfford resuming his office, and received the ambassadors of Persia and Siam.

=== Presidency of Madras ===
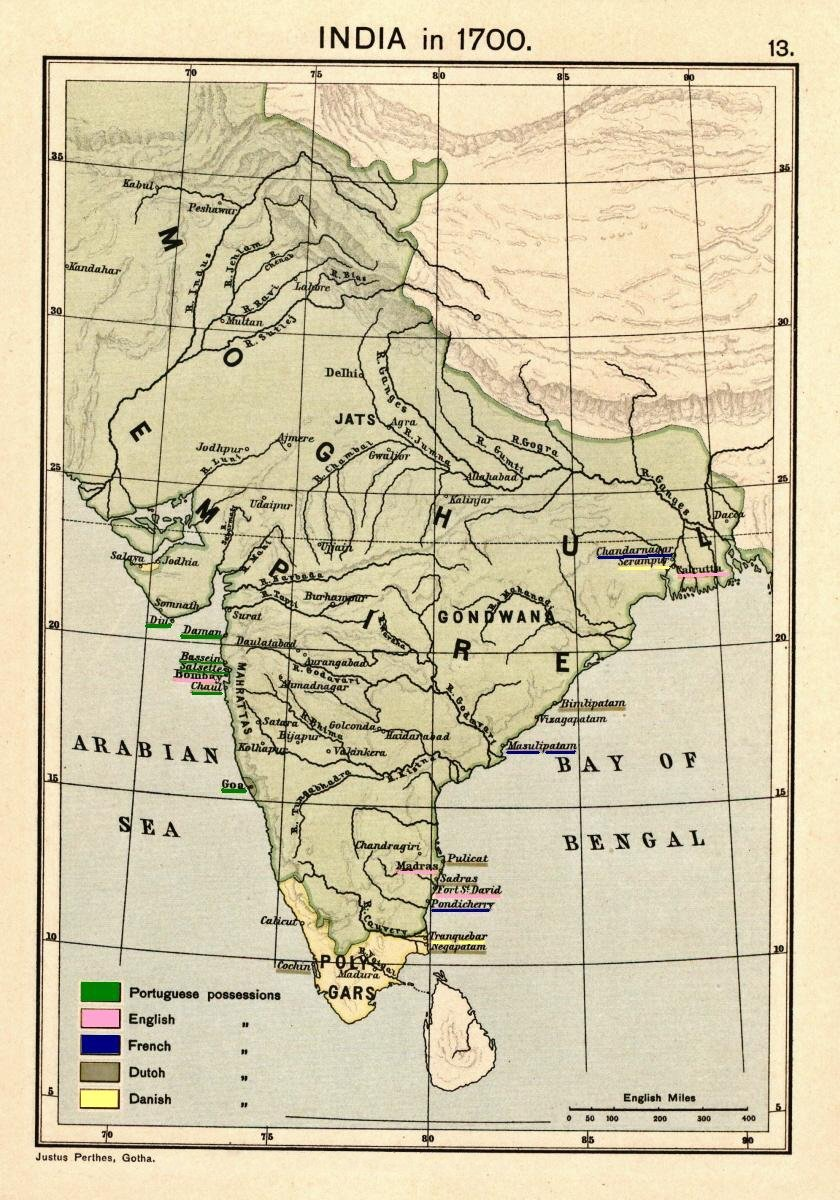
Map of the Mughal Empire in 1700, covering most of India, with Madras being surrounded at the bottom right in pink

In July 1687, Yale was appointed President of Madras and Governor of Fort St. George, replacing William Gyfford. A difficulty of the office was to deal with the native rulers through firmans, as Madras was surrounded by the Mughal Empire, with rulers always asking for bribes. When their demands were refused, they would seize the food supplies, half starving the company's servants with a blockade. In terms of size, Madras consisted of about 300,000 people, or around 6% of England's population at the time. Yale had previously been popular with both the Europeans and native Indians, and reverted to the former practice of living and dining in the Fort House with merchants, writers and factors.

With Yale's nomination, Sir Josiah Child hoped that Madras would be less critical of London. As the East India Company's headquarters were thousands of miles away, the board implemented policies that were not well adapted to the conditions in Madras. Letters took 6 months to be received, sometimes over a year, making communications difficult. One of these policies was the creation of a new tax upon Madras inhabitants that Yale had now to carry out, which caused a local rebellion. During this time, they accused him of not cutting expenses down, such as keeping a Bengal tiger at the fort, among other things. Those who were taxed the most were the owners of the 128 houses within the fort, which half belonged to the Portuguese merchants. The company's chairman sent a letter to Yale, writing that "your elaborate arguments to persuade us not to impose a moderate duty upon the Portuguese and other inhabitants of our city of Madras, whom we do protect and exceedingly encourage in their several vocations, have no weight at all with us".

Yale had received similar letters during the Great Famine under Gov. Gyfford, where they had refused to collect taxes, with the directors replying that "you are still fencing against our creating revenue at the Fort, with slight, insignificant arguments, wherein the worst is that you should have so mean an opinion of us, as to think such sophistical reasons will make any impressions on our judgment". The directors also gave the order to close the Garden House, which was used for those who were resting outside the city, having a place to eat. Yale didn't follow this order and kept Gov. Gyfford there as his health was fragile. During August 1687, Yale is then recorded corresponding with the Ambassador of Shah Suleiman of Persia, regarding his arrival with a Koran to try to convert the Siamese king to Mohammedanism, which the latter refused. Being bankrupt after his failed mission, Yale loaned him money, which was never repaid.

=== Anglo-Siamese War ===
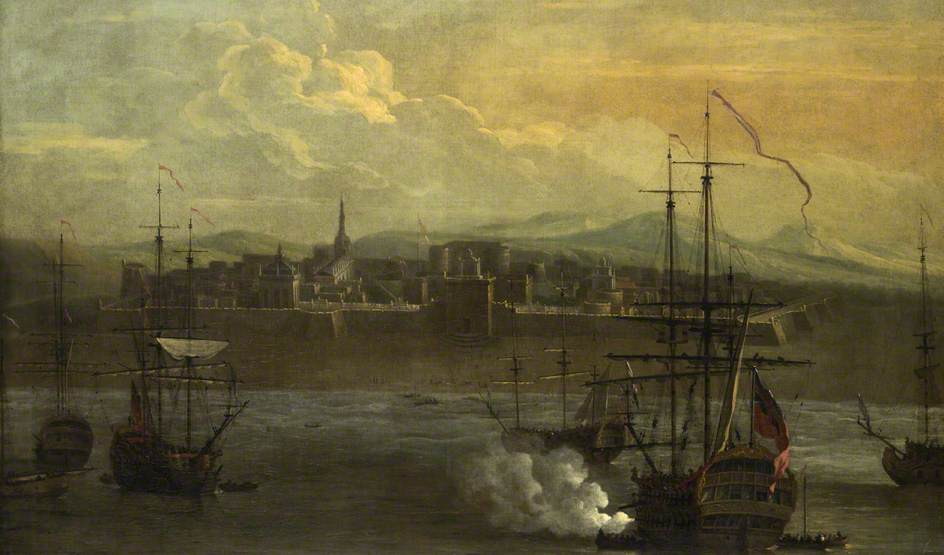
Warships attacking Fort St. George, Madras, along the Coromandel Coast. c. 1731 by Beorbe Lambert and Samuel Scott

For many years, merchants of Madras and Siam were trading partners in the Andaman Sea, trading in rhinoceros horns, elephant tusks, copper and other commodities. Yale's brother, Thomas Yale, became ambassador to King Narai of Siam, and during this time, Elihu would entertain at his house the French ambassador and musketeer, Count Claude de Forbin, drinking to the health of the royal families of England and France. But around August 1687, disputes regarding Siam's strategic importance emerged among European powers, and Gov. Yale was charged by King Narai's agents regarding the sale of jewels, which they estimated having overpaid by 25%. The man behind the charges was a Greek named Constantine Phaulkon, who wanted to lower English's influence over King Narai, and get him closer to Louis XIV of France through Chevalier de Chaumont.

This trading dispute started the Anglo-Siamese War, with Yale acting on behalf of King James II of England, which resulted in number of casualties for the company, as cities were now being robbed by Siameses. Some English merchants at Siam sided with the enemy, and became involved in acts of piracy, which had Yale send warships in retaliation against Englishmen who changed sides. No peace treaty was ever signed, but the war against the Company will eventually stop around 1688. In London, the directors investigated the accusations of the Siameses on Yale and cleared his name, declaring that "you can not be ignorant that Phaulkon himself in the King of Siam's name, began the war... upon a pretense that Mr. Yale injured the King of Siam in a bargain". Phaulkon's alliance with France would later cost him his life, being assassinated by the Siameses nobles during the Siamese revolution of 1688. On 11 August 1687, Yale approved the recall of several Englishmen to Madras detained by Prussian Wolf Henrik von Kalnein, governor of Tranquebar under the Danish East India Co..

=== Siege of Golconda ===
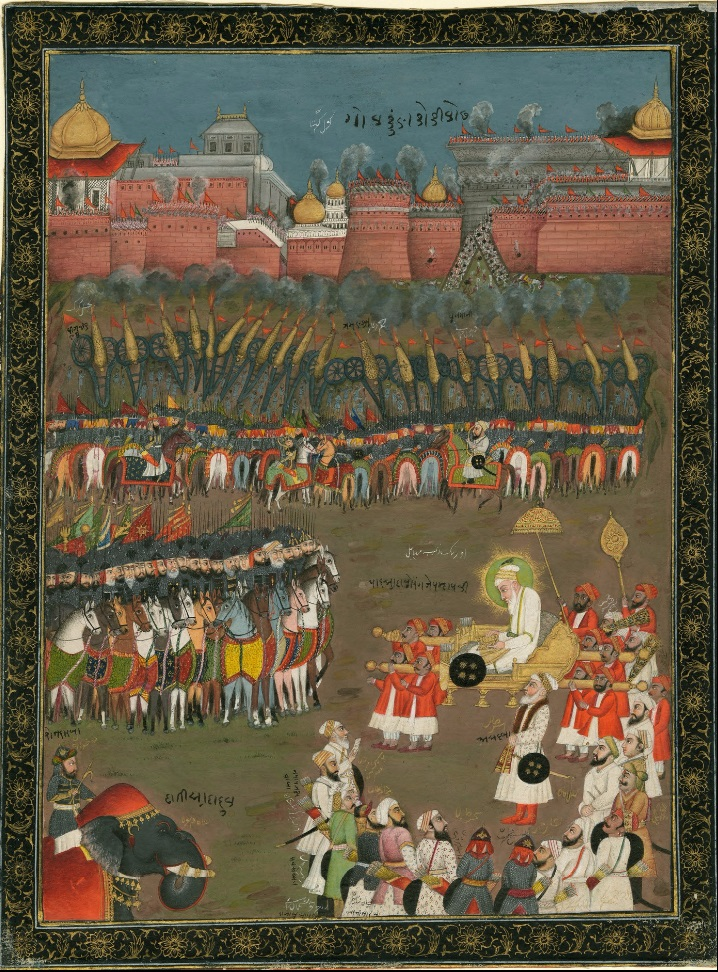
Mughal Emperor Aurangzeb on his war elephant during the Siege of Golconda. Unknown artist, 1750–1790

About a month later, on 22 September 1687, Mughal Emperor Aurangzeb conquered the nearby Kingdom of Golconda, defeating Sultan Abul Shah at the Siege of Golconda, ending the Qutb Shahi dynasty. Aurangzeb was a member of Tamerlane's dynasty, and his parents, founders of the Taj Mahal, were direct descendants of Genghis Khan. As Yale expected the Mughal's revenge for the Anglo-Mughal War started by the directors in Bengal, he prepared for war and raised a Portuguese militia, but as the Mughal had thousands of war elephants, he and the council had no choice but to pay him 50,000 pagodas to keep the Company's activities in Madras. Gov. Yale was now under the overlordship of the Islamic Mughal Empire. He sent diplomats to pay Emperor Aurangzeb, one of which was his friend Daniel Chardin, diamond merchant and brother of Sir Jean Chardin, Yale's partner in England. He also sent letters to Mughal general Mahabat Khan, and complied with the ceremonies of prince Muhammad Bakhs and prime minister Asad Khan. The situation was delicate as the Dutch and Louis XIV at Versailles were also trying to get the Mughal in their favor, and the directors would hold Yale responsible if anything went wrong, including failing to keep the Golconda diamonds trade from the Kollur Mines.

At the time, India was the world producer of diamonds, with Golconda producing 60% of its total output. Most of Yale's private fortune will be obtained from this trade with the Moghul, who received royalties, while Yale used his expertise and capital to hold on these stones until they were faceted and polished in Amsterdam, on their way to London. The process took on average 3 years before getting a return on investment, and Yale had 50 trained men to protect the goods from robbers during transportation. By 1688, Sir Josiah Child, the Company's largest shareholder, retired with a fortune of about £200,000 (equivalent to £43.2 million in 2025), and married his daughter to the son of the 1st Duke of Beaufort at Badminton House. During the same year, Yale welcomed the Armenian merchants to establish themselves at Fort St. George following their persecution in Europe. In July, he sent diplomats for the arrival of Dutch Gov. Johannes Camphuys, and on 29 September 1688, he inaugurated the Madras Corporation, where Nathaniel Higginson was elected its first mayor, with Amsterdam merchant Jacques de Paiva and others, elected on its board. Initially founded to restrain Yale's powers as governor, it became the oldest corporation in India, and the second oldest municipal body in the world after the City of London. Paiva's widow, Hieronima, would become Yale's mistress and bear him a son named Charles.

=== Anglo-Dutch relations ===
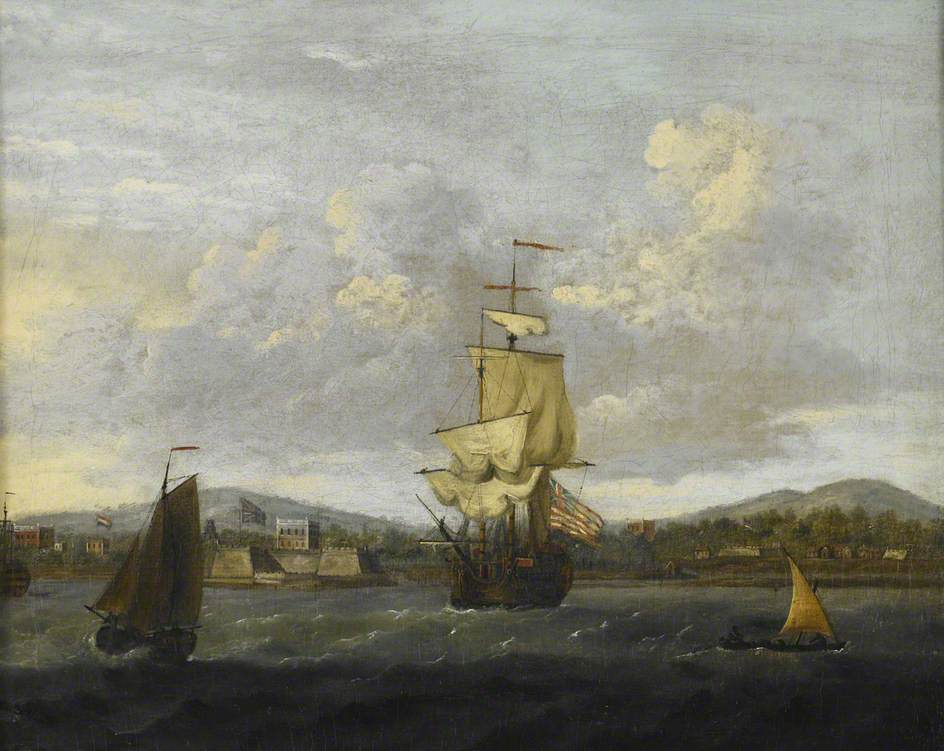
A fleet arriving at Fort St. David on the left, in Cuddalore. c. 1763 by Francis Swaine

Following the English Revolution of 1688, William of Orange, a Dutch, ascended to the throne of England, replacing James II, which was a fatal blow for Sir Josiah Child who had bet on the wrong side. The past wars between the Dutch and English merchants in Madras were now settled, and both started to form alliances through marriage. From then on, the directors' letters to Yale changed in tone. Sir Langhorne started complimenting him on his private trade in diamonds, as they now saw it as a way to expand the company to new markets without having to bear the risks themselves. Yale tried to build routes at Mindanao, the second largest island of the Philippines, getting from them Clove and Ironwood. He was then put on a secret committee with Sir John Child, governor of Bombay, and Nathaniel Higginson, mayor of Madras, to plan the establishment of a new fort near the South Seas, to engage in trade with China. On 17 March 1689, Yale received the arrival of Commander Job Charnock, with his staff and four companies of soldiers. He arrived from a failed mission that consisted of blocking and seizing the ships of Mughal Aurangzeb, who had attacked the company's ships in the Bay of Bengal, and taken control of Chittagong during the Anglo-Mughal War.

Charnock stayed in Madras for a few months under Gov. Yale's protection, which caused dissensions in the council for fear of the Mughal's revenge. The Council eventually outvoted Yale, and Charnock was forced to leave, where he would found the city of Calcutta. In July, 1690, news of the war between William of Orange and Louis XIV of France arrived in Madras, and Yale prepared Fort St. George once more for war. On 15 August, the French sent seven warships to attack the Madras roads, along with one fireship. The fort was protected by a garrison of 700 soldiers under Gov. Yale, with the help of a Dutch fleet. Combat lasted a few hours, and the French were repulsed by the fort's guns, after which they didn't return. Yale then negotiated the release of Englishmen, dealing with Moghul general Shaista Khan, along with Daniel Chardin, who was sent to the King of Kandy. In 1690, Yale's brother negotiated with Rama Raja, the Chhatrapati of the Marathas, for the acquisition of a fort at Devanampatnam on behalf of the company, which was sold for 40,000 pagodas. They renamed the place Fort St. David in honor of a Welsh saint. On 28 December, they supplied ammunition to general Zulfiqar Khan, son of Grand Vizier Asad Khan, from which they obtained the firman for the territories of Vizagapatam, Gingee and Golconda. During this year, Yale was also instrumental to the development of the Government General Hospital for Madras soldiers.

=== Slavery ===
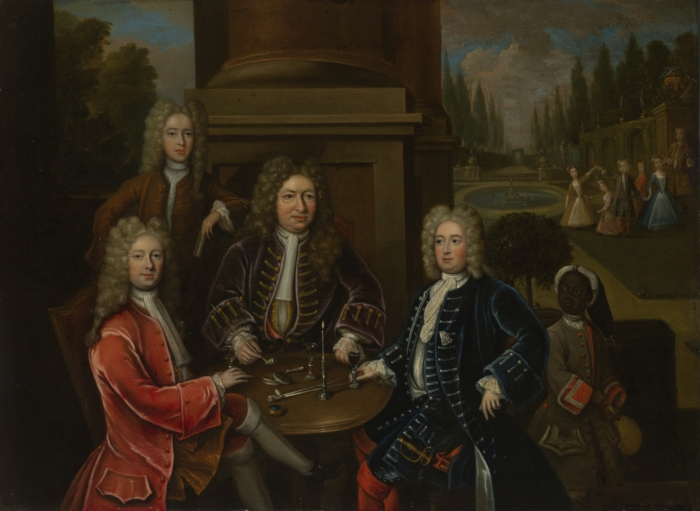
Elihu Yale with Members of his Family and an Enslaved Child, unknown artist, c. 1708

Records of the period indicate a flourishing slave trade in Madras. After English merchants began to kidnap young children and deport them to distant parts of the world, the administration of Fort St George stepped in and introduced laws to curb the practice. On 2 February 1688, Elihu Yale decreed that slaves should be examined by the judges of the choultry before being transported. Transportation of young children, in particular, was made unlawful. During his tenure as President of Madras, Yale ordered a minimum of 10 slaves sent on every ship going to Europe, and on a month in 1687, Fort St George exported at least 665 slaves. In his judicial capacity he also on several occasions sentenced so-called "black criminals" to whipping and enslavement. Evidence as to whether Yale personally owned slaves, or participated directly in their sale is inconclusive; the historian Steven Pincus suggests that he did not, while, in a 2016 article in the Journal of Global History, Elizabeth Kuebler-Wolf stated that he enslaved one or two people as household servants, citing explorer Hiram Bingham's 1939 book Elihu Yale. Historian Joseph Yannielli writes that although Yale "probably did not own any of these people – the majority were held as the property of the East India Company – he certainly profited both directly and indirectly from their sale", while the Sterling Professor David W. Blight suggests that Yale's personal ownership is "not a key question [...] some portion of [his] considerable fortune derived from his myriad entanglements with the purchase and sale of human beings" through his "key leadership role in the business of human trafficking".

=== The Groom ===
Gov. Yale's story of having hanged his groom for taking his favorite horse on a day is a false story that was propagated by privateer Alexander Hamilton. The events were as follow: In August 1689, two soldiers of Fort St. George stole guns, horses, and other items, and left Madras as fugitives with a group of five confederates to join the enemy's army during war time. One was named George Isaac, and the other was named Charles Cross, the latter being not only a soldier but also one of the grooms of the fort's stables. They were captured by the Polligars on their way to the Mughal and surrendered to Madras on condition of showing them mercy, which was initially agreed, but once arrived, Gov. Yale and the Council decided to have them sentenced for treason and desertion. One was executed before the stables, the other was shot in front of the fort's gate. Thirty-eight years later, Capt. Hamilton wrote about the event in his memoirs, from a "weal and treacherous memory". As a past employee who became a Privateer, he never forgave the taxes the Company forced upon him during his private travels, and his depiction of the time, always critical of his past employer, are not considered faithful about the period.

== Elihu Yale v. East India Co. ==
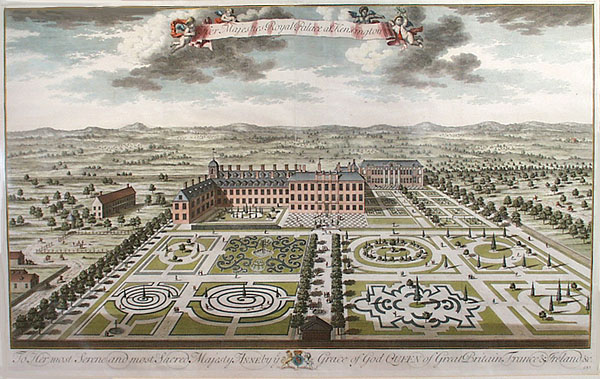
Kensington Palace, 1700s, where Elihu Yale's case was heard by the King of England, William of Orange, and his Privy Council

The later years of Yale's governance was marked by serious conflicts between his Presidency and the council, coming from Thomas Gray, Sir Josiah Child's servant, and lawyer William Fraser, a man known for his violent temper. They accused Yale of trying to get military power into his own hands. In 1691, Yale then received several Indian merchants and citizens who came to complain about Fraser's behaviour as new Mayor of Madras. Fraser had imprisoned four of their friends for refusing to sign an arbitration proceeding, and were stuck without food adapted to their religion. Yale ordered the marshal to temporarily release them to their private homes, and reversed other sentences made by the Mayor's Court. Yale wrote in his letter that "he would have been unfaithful to his trust had he permitted an innocent man to starve to death in prison". On 1 October 1692, letters arrived from London with accusations against Yale, making Nathaniel Higginson the new President of Madras. According to Madras historian Fanny Penny, the accusations were the same as with past governors, being the "old story of private trade, jealousy on the part of his fellow-merchants, and suspicion and distrust at home as his wealth accumulated".

By then, Yale's fortune was at £205,000 (equivalent to £38.1 million in 2025), which was the same as the Company's former chairman and largest shareholder, Sir Josiah Child. On 23 November, Sir John Goldsborough and judge John Dolben arrived in Madras for Yale's investigation. The Councillors took the law into their own hands, and had the Yale brothers imprisoned, and fearing of being poisoned, Yale wrote a letter to be delivered to the King of England by his brother, who will leave Madras on 20 February 1694. The investigators then inspected the fortifications around Black Town, the Indian natives's neighborhood. Yale had built the walls with the company's fund to protect the town against invasions of the Mughal Emperor, but having not followed the directors's order to tax the natives for it, he was fined 3484 pagodas with interest by the Company. Goldsborough then sent a group of musketeers to Mrs. Nicks's house, Yale's friend, to investigate fraud charges regarding cloths, where she would be fined for her husband's mistakes. Not having enough money to pay the taxes to bring her children home to England, she would be forced to sail without them. For Yale's trial, William Fraser was first put on the court, but Yale had him temporarily displaced after Fraser had imprisoned a Portuguese merchant for four years upon suspicion alone. By July, Sir John Goldsborough concluded his investigation, and left the countercharges to Fraser, not finding any evidence that Yale had defrauded the East India Company. His fines were based for the most part on technicalities, where he had not followed orders or made errors of judgment.

=== The case reaches London ===
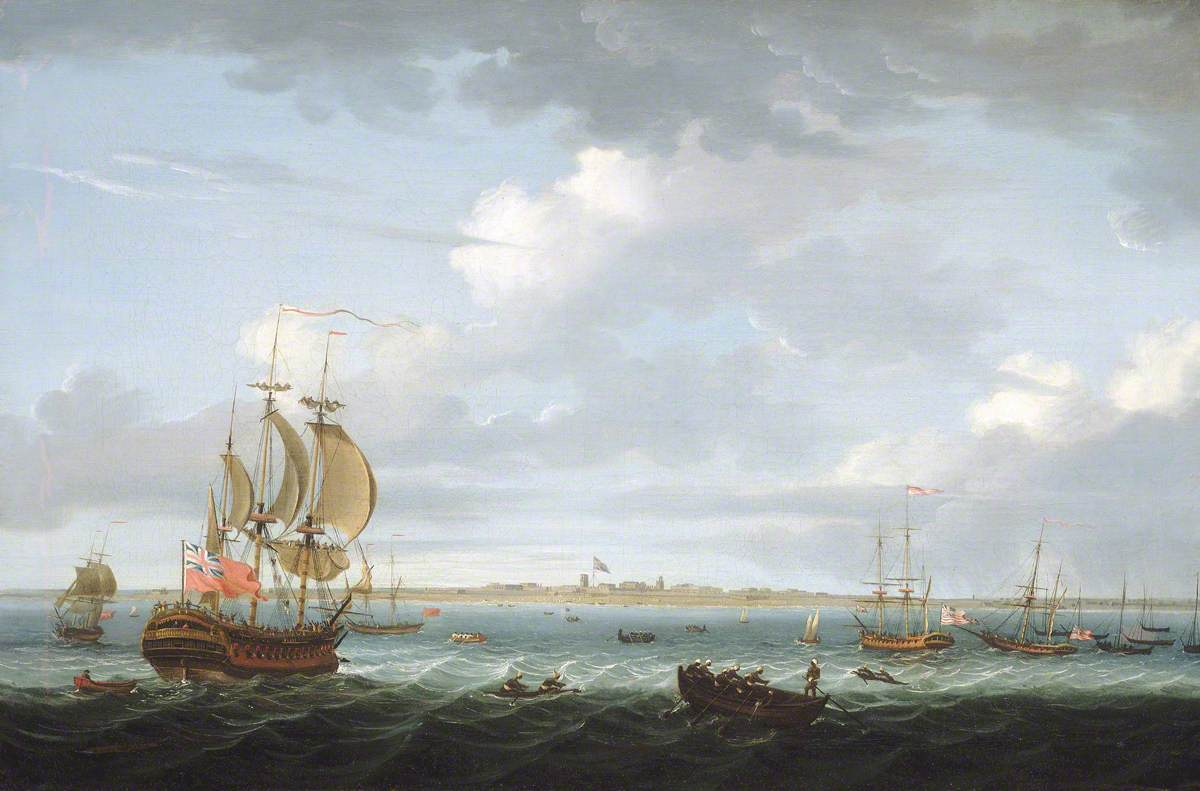
An East Indiaman ship sailing off Madras, such as used by Yale for his return to England in 1699

Ten months later, while still in prison, Yale's brother arrived in London in 1695, and appealed directly to the King's Privy Council on 14 February at Kensington Palace, contesting the accusations. The Privy Council ordered a reply from the East India Company but were not impressed by their statements against Yale's activities, therefore they ordered, on behalf of the king, to stop all the company's ships that were ready to sail for Fort St. George in India. Yale's case was given to Sir Thomas Rawlinson, and was attended by the King of England, William of Orange, Prince George of Denmark, Archbishop Thomas Tenison and the principal ministers. They ordered that the Attorney General examine the charter granted to the whole Company, and to examine their powers in matters of judicature. Their investigation was brought to Parliament, where they discovered briberies made by Sir Josiah Child and Sir Thomas Cook to Tory members. Thereafter, the King of England, William of Orange, ordered on 15 March 1695, the liberation of Elihu Yale, so that he could come back to England whenever he chose, with the additional order of giving him the Great Cabin in the Company ship of his choosing when he would be ready to sail home. When the letter reached Madras ten months later on 8 January 1696, Yale was immediately offered a ship for Britain, but having already served the company for over 20 years, he decided to stay as Fraser was still on his case.

Fraser then suggested to Sir Josiah Child that Yale had poisoned four members of the Council over the years. Fraser's case relied on statements made by two Indian natives that were not sworn, where they said that they had heard someone, who is now dead, say that somebody else, who has now left Madras, that two of Yale's enemies were still alive, and that they would be dead soon. Based on native gossips, the directors dismissed the case. Thereafter, president Higginson was told by his servant of seven years that Fraser had threatened him twice, to which he replied that he had beaten him because he didn't like his Salams. Fraser was then charged and banned from the council. With Fraser removed, Yale stayed at Fort St. George for some years, and over time, cleared his name of all scandal and developed his diamond business. Gov. Thomas Pitt, who would find the Pitt Diamond, became Yale's partner, as the Company had now removed all restrictions on private trade. In 1699, after a 30 years career in India, Yale decided to sail home, and was granted the usual privilege of past governors to bring back five tons of goods, which he filled with diamonds, rubies, sapphires, Chinawares, Persian carpets, nutmegs, and other items. He decided to have Gov Pitt's ship as his vessel, and brought back with him the children of Mrs. Nicks. Over time, the old accusations against the company's officers enriching themselves at their expense appeared less frequently, as the directors learned that their employees could grow wealthy while advancing their commercial interests.

== Return to Britain ==
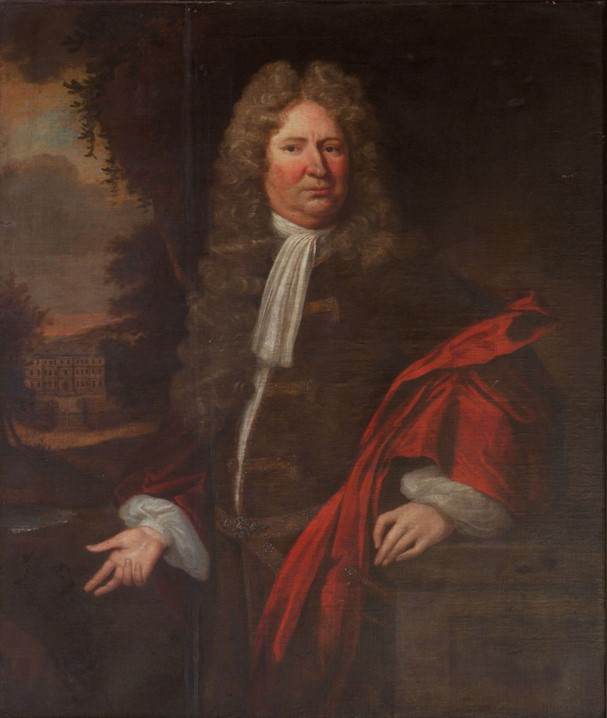
Elihu Yale and his London home, possibly by Michael Dahl, gifted by Joseph Verner Reed Jr. and Sr.

Yale arrived in Britain in 1699 with a fortune that amounted to £200,000 (equivalent to £32.2 million in 2025), mostly made from his diamond business in the Golconda mines and Kollur mines in Southern India. In relation to GDP, his fortune amounted to 1/4 % of UK's GDP at the time, which translates to nearly 6 billion British pounds in 2021 money. Famous diamonds extracted from these mines over time have included the Orlov Diamond, belonging to Catherine the Great, the Hope Diamond, belonging to Louis XIV, the Wittelsbach-Graff Diamond, belonging to the Habsburgs, among others. Yale acquired rough stones from the Mughal Emperors of Golconda in exchange for a royalty, and were sent to Fort St. George, India, under the protection of 50 trained men. Thereafter, Yale would send the diamonds to Amsterdam to be faceted and polished, until ready to be shipped to London. The process took on average 3 years and needed large amounts of capital to endure setbacks, such as wars and political instability.

During the War of the Spanish Succession, shipments would get stolen by pirates on their way to Europe, and once there, the Europeans princes and nobility would lack the funds to acquire them, forcing some merchants into bankruptcy. Demand followed the Coronations of monarchs, royal court events, war victories and other ceremonies. It became the most important branch of private trade of East India employees between Madras and London. Along with Sir Jean Chardin and Jean-Baptiste Tavernier, Yale became one of the largest European diamond traders in the world, as nearly all diamonds came from India during that period. Chardin, the past jewel merchant of the Shah of Persia, was also one his partners. He kept doing business with his friends Gov. Thomas Pitt, grandfather of prime minister William Pitt, and Sir Charles Cotterell, during the era where London became the international trading centre of diamonds, dislodging Portugal and the Netherlands. This new class of merchants who made their fortune in the East Indies would become known as the Nabobs in Britain.

=== London life ===
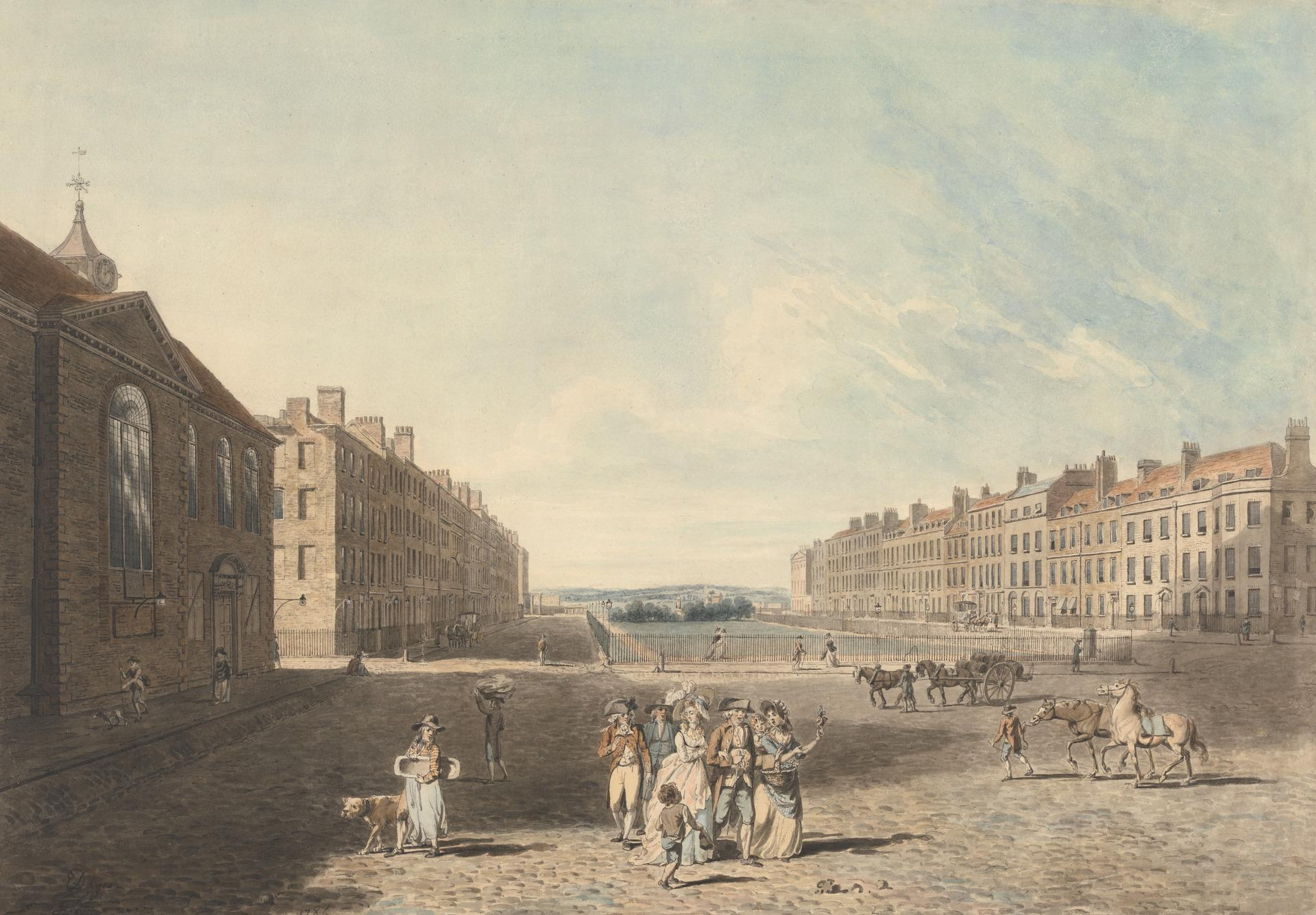
Painting of Queen Square, Yale's London house location, from the Yale Center for British Art

During the Georgian era under King George I, Yale and other merchants would meet at London coffee houses as centres of social life. He kept his title of governor, and after the failures of his bankers, he opened a bank account in the newly created Bank of England, with deposits at C. Hoare & Co of Sir Richard Hoare, now the oldest bank in Britain. He lived most of his remaining years at the Plas Grono estate in Wales, next to Erddig Hall, inherited from the line of his great-grandfather, Chancellor David Yale, and at his London house in Queen Square. His neighbors included the Duke of Powis at Powis House, Lord Chancellor Bathurst, Queen Anne and her son Prince William, and artists Charles Burney and Jonathan Richardson. In London society, Yale was associated with Sir Charles Cotterell, Master of the Ceremonies. He was then elected in December 1717 a Fellow of the Royal Society under Sir Isaac Newton. His candidature was introduced by Sir Hans Sloan, founder of the British Museum and compeer of Voltaire and Benjamin Franklin. In the same year, Yale was asked by Newton to deal with the donations of Dr. Thomas Paget, and later received a new map of the Netherlands dedicated to him by John Senex, royal geographer of Queen Anne.

Thereafter, his American godson David Yale entered Pembroke College at the University of Cambridge. Yale leased Latimer House from his son-in-law, Lord James Cavendish, son of the 1st Duke of Devonshire, to accommodate his daughter Ursula. He was elected High Sheriff of Denbighshire in Wales, gave money to Wrexham Church, and built a family gallery. He then became a member of the Society for the Propagation of the Gospel, and met there the Bishop of London, John Robinson, and the Lt. Gov. of New England, Francis Nicholson. From Nicholson's influence, and with Jeremiah Dummer as intermediary, Yale would answer a donation request for Connecticut College through Harvard graduate Cotton Mather. While his initial plan was to bestow a charity at Oxford, he sent them books, along with Sir Isaac Newton. He also sent a newly painted portrait of King George I by artist Sir Godfrey Kneller, principal painter of the king at the time, and the institution changed its name to Yale College. The total sum gifted was about the same as John Harvard's to Harvard College. The painting is now at Yale University Gallery, while about 214 of the books are at Yale Library. Yale's will included donations to the poor of Wrexham in Wales, to Christ's Hospital in London, St Bartholomew's Hospital, St Thomas' Hospital, various workhouse and poorhouses, and to Connecticut College, later known as Yale.

== Marriage and children ==
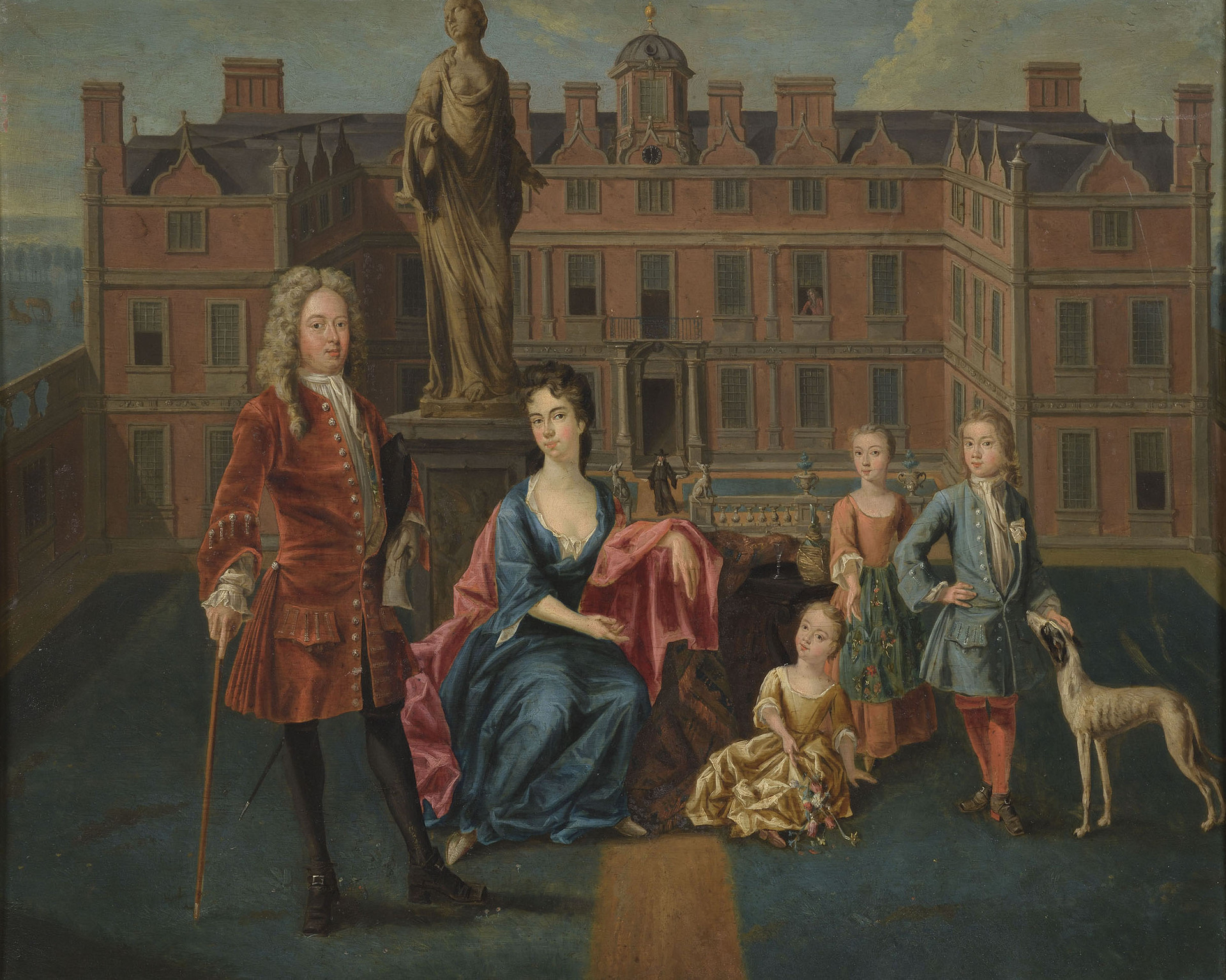
Katherine Yale with her husband Dudley North, at their family seat, Glemham Hall, by artist Peter Vanderbank c. 1715

In 1680 Yale married Catherine Elford, widow of Joseph Hynmers, second-in-command of Fort St George, India as Deputy Governor for the East India Company. Her father was wealthy Levant merchant Walter Elford, son of Turkey merchant Walter Sr., the step-nephew of Admiral Sir Francis Drake of Buckland Abbey, the explorer, and the half-brother of Sir Francis Drake, the MP.

Walter Elford Sr. was among the pioneers of the English Coffee Houses on Exchange Alley, next to the Royal Exchange, owning the Great Coffee House (Turk's Head) until the Great Fire of London, and was featured in Samuel Pepys's diaries. Catherine Elford's maternal grandfather was merchant Richard Chambers, Alderman and Sheriff of the City of London, family of Sir Amyas Bampfylde of Poltimore House and Barrington Court.

Their wedding took place at St Mary's Church, at Fort St George, where Yale was a vestryman and treasurer. The marriage was the first registered at the church. They had 4 children together. David Yale died young in 1687. Katherine Yale (died 1715), married Dudley North of Glenham Hall, a cousin of Lord North, the prime minister who later lost the American War of Independence. Their daughter would marry Nicholas Herbert, son of Thomas Herbert, 8th Earl of Pembroke, and lived at Wilton House and Highclere Castle.

Anne Yale (died 1734) married Lord James Cavendish of Chatsworth House, son of the 1st Duke of Devonshire of Hardwick Hall, and Lady Mary Butler, the Duke of Ormond's daughter at Kilkenny Castle. Lord Cavendish was also a nephew of Earl John Cecil of Burghley House, and a grandson of Countess Elizabeth Cecil of Hatfield House.

Ursula Yale, who never married, died in 1721 at Latimer House, a house rented by Yale from his son-in-law - who is buried in the church on the estate. In 1687, after the death of Jacques de Paiva, a Portuguese Jewish diamond merchant and mines owner, Yale formed a relationship with his widow Hieronima de Paiva and brought her to live with him, causing a scandal within Madras's colonial society. They had a son who died, along with his mother, in South Africa.

== Death ==
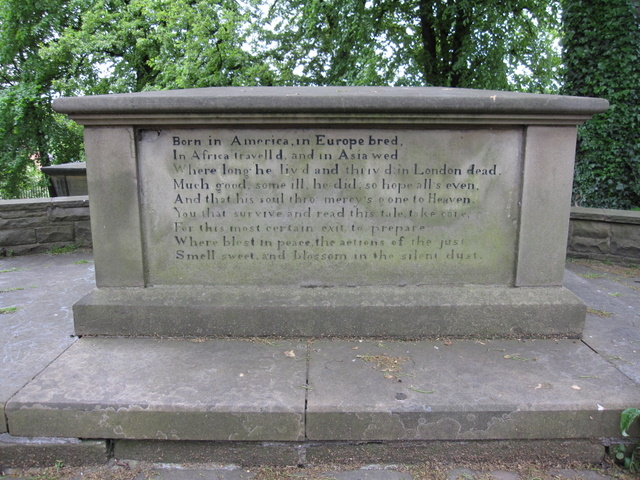
Yale's grave in the grounds of St Giles' Church

Yale died on 8 July 1721 in London. No descendants of his have survived past his great-grandchildren. His body was buried in the churchyard of the parish church of St Giles' Church, Wrexham, Wales. His tomb bears an inscription:

Born in America, in Europe bred
In Africa travell'd and in Asia wed
Where long he liv'd and thriv'd; In London dead
Much good, some ill, he did; so hope all's even
And that his soul thro' mercy's gone to Heaven
You that survive and read this tale, take care
For this most certain exit to prepare
Where blest in peace, the actions of the just
Smell sweet and blossom in the silent dust.

In Boston, Massachusetts, a tablet to Yale was erected in 1927 at Scollay Square, near the site of Yale's birth. Yale president Arthur Twining Hadley penned the inscription, which reads: "On Pemberton Hill, 255 Feet North of This Spot, Was Born on April Fifth 1649 Elihu Yale, Governor of Madras, Whose Permanent Memorial in His Native Land is the College That Bears His Name."

At his death, with no proper will, his heirs-at-law inherited the Plas Grono estate and sold it to Sir George Wynne.

== Yale University ==
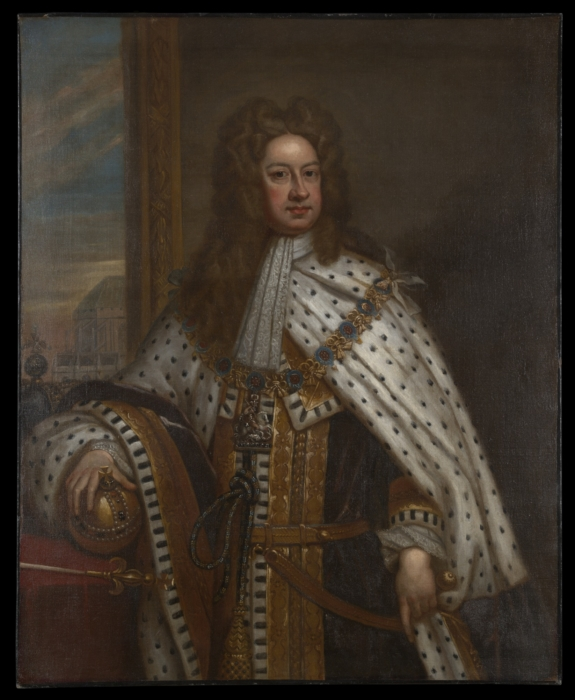
The portrait of King George I of Britain gifted by Elihu Yale to Yale College as its initial endowment

In 1718, Cotton Mather contacted Yale and asked for his help. Mather represented a small institution of learning that had been founded in 1701 in Old Saybrook, Connecticut, as the Collegiate School of Connecticut, which needed money for a new building. In 1717, Isaac Newton gave the college a copy of his book Principia, on Newton's laws of motion and Newton's law of universal gravitation, and in 1718, Yale sent Mather 417 books, a portrait of King George I of Britain, and nine bales of goods. These last were sold by the school for £800. In gratitude, officials named the new building Yale; eventually the entire institution became Yale College.

Yale was also a vestryman and treasurer of St Mary's Church at Fort St George. On 6 October 1968, the 250th anniversary of the naming of Yale College for Yale, the classmates of Chester Bowles, then the American ambassador to India and a graduate of Yale (1924), donated money for lasting improvements to the church and erected a plaque to commemorate the occasion. In 1970, a portrait of him, later renamed Elihu Yale with Members of his Family and an Enslaved Child, was donated to the Yale Center for British Art from Chatsworth House. A portrait, painted during the 18th century, was also given to Yale University by U.S. President Dwight D. Eisenhower.

On 5 April 1999, Yale University recognised the 350th anniversary of Yale's birthday. An article that year in American Heritage magazine by John Steele Gordon described Yale as the "most overrated philanthropist" in American history, arguing that the college that became Yale University was successful largely because of the generosity of a man named Jeremiah Dummer, but that the trustees of the school did not want it known by the name "Dummer College". Of Yale's donation to the college, totalling just under £1,162, Gordon suggested that "never has so much immortality been purchased for so paltry a [...] sum."

In her article for The Atlantic about Skull and Bones, a secret society at Yale University, Alexandra Robbins alleges that Yale's headstone was stolen years ago from its proper setting in Wrexham. She further alleges that the tombstone is now displayed in a glass case in a room with purple walls.

=== 21st century re-appraisal ===
In the 21st century Yale University's historic associations with the slave trade have been re-evaluated. In 2017, the university determined to rename Calhoun College, which honoured the white supremacist and pro-slavery leader John C. Calhoun. In respect of Elihu Yale, the process was assisted by the availability online of the relevant East India Company records. In 2020 Yale's president, Peter Salovey, launched the Yale and Slavery Research Project to explore the university's links with slavery and colonialism, including Elihu Yale's central role. The project was led by David W. Blight, director of the Gilder Lehrman Center for the Study of Slavery, Resistance, and Abolition, and published its findings in 2024. Blight identified "Yale's key leadership role in the business of human trafficking" and confirmed that part of Yale's fortune unquestionably derived from "the purchase and sale of human beings [...] much of his growing wealth derived from the lucrative trade in cloth, silks, precious jewels, and other commodities, yet this commerce was inseparable from the slave trade". In his foreword to the report, Salovey wrote of the importance of the study as providing a "deeper, more honest understanding of who we are" and of helping in "coming to terms with injustices of the past and in confronting current wrongs".

A linked re-evaluation considered the artworks donated by, and related to, Elihu Yale, in particular, the painting Elihu Yale with Members of his Family and an Enslaved Child. The picture, which shows Yale and his relations being served by a collared African child, was donated to the Yale Center for British Art in 1970 and regularly displayed at the university. In 2020 the artist Titus Kaphar produced a version of the painting, entitled "Enough About You", in which the main sitters are distorted beyond recognition and the image of the uncollared boy is set within a gold frame. (Note: Of the seven paintings depicting Yale owned by the university, three show him with enslaved attendants.) (Note: The historian Jonathan Holloway considers the painting and its context in a discussion for the Yale Center for British Art.)

== The Yale collection ==
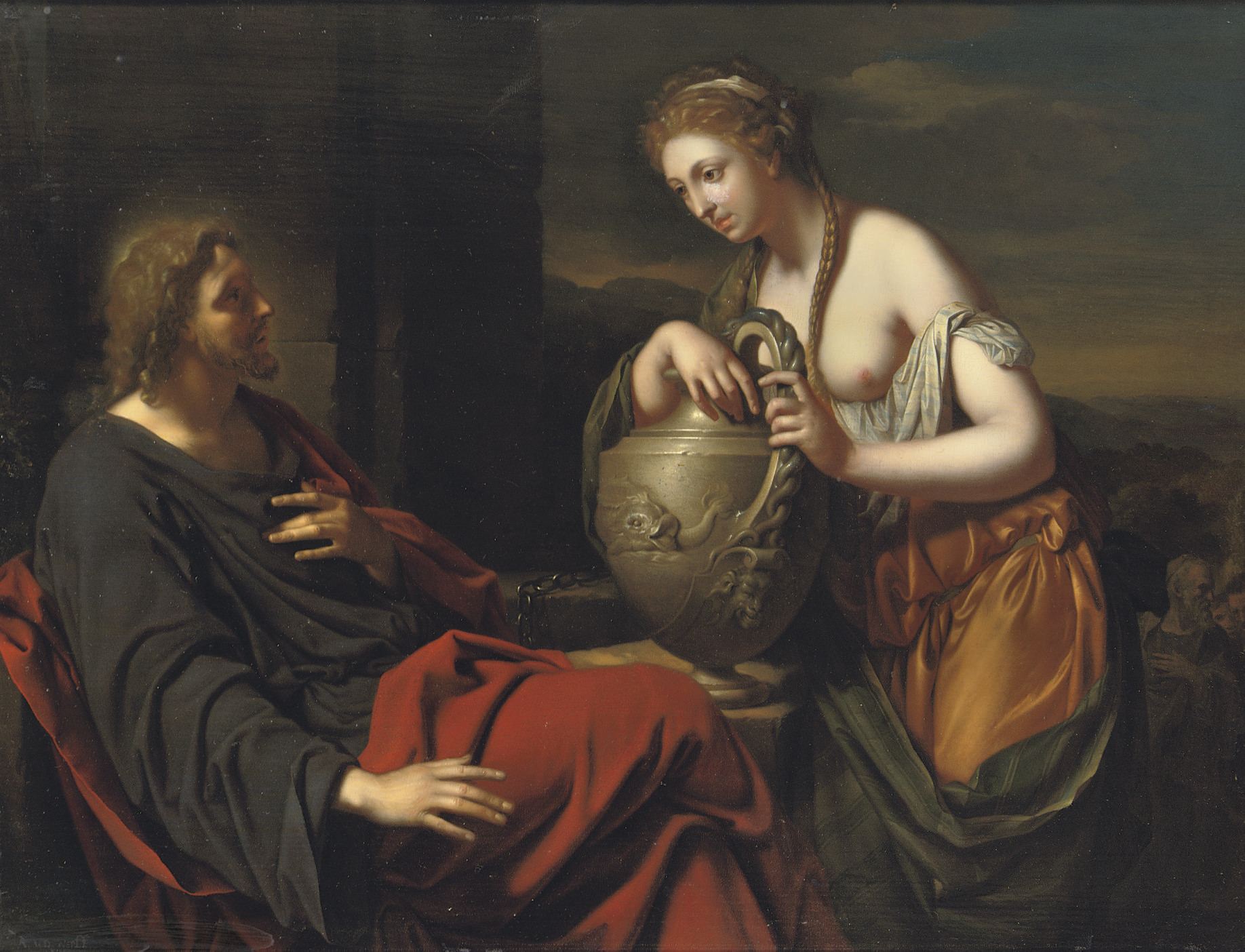
The Christ and the Samaritan Woman, a key item of Yale's collection, painted by Medici baroque painter Adriaen van der Werff

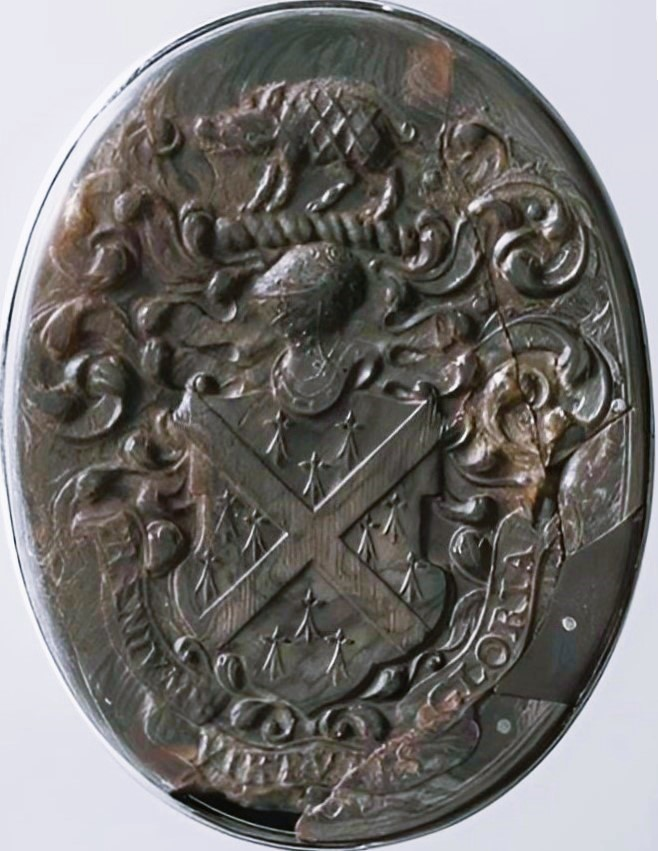
Coat of arms of Elihu, acquired by Yale College president Ezra Stiles in 1788, from the Yale family

Yale arrived in England with Indian artworks, and used his new wealth to build a large European art collection of 10,000 items, including 7,000 paintings, which would become, after his death, the first art auction in Britain. During this era, the English country houses started to include goods from India and China, brought over the continent by the East India Company. As about 75% of all Indian exports were long-lasting and colorful textiles, it gave rise to the 1700–1750 Western fashion period, which included the use of tapestries. A new desire for collecting emerged among the English aristocracy under the Duke of Marlborough at Blenheim Palace, and the Duke of Devonshire at Chatsworth House. Yale followed their lead and became a famous collector in London, with artists visiting him at his Queen Square home to secure patronage, one of which would be Vanderbank, who worked at Kensington Palace and Castle Howard.

Many of Yale's paintings came from Dutch Golden Age's artists, the most famous being Rembrandt, Bruegel, Van Dyck, Rubens, Dürer, Van de Velde, Teniers, Lely, Kneller and Rosa. Yale's collection was stored in four London houses, in addition to several coach houses and stables. Through the influence of the Royal Society under Isaac Newton, he collected instruments built on new science from dealers like George Willdey. He obtained the Leibniz–Clarke correspondence and acquired books from Bernard de Montfaucon, one of the modern founders of archaeology at the time. With a rising middle class in search of status symbols, he acquired watches and clocks from Thomas Tompion, father of English clockmaking, along with works of engineer Henry Winstanley. When Queen Anne commissioned Nicolas Dorigny to produce large prints at Hampton Court, Yale and the Duke of Devonshire acquired several of them. He acquired one of the Jewels of Mary, Queen of Scots, along with works of Medici painter Adriaen van der Werff.

Other paintings included those of philosopher Thomas Hobbes, astronomer Pierre Gassendi, Sir John Wynn, and Jacques Courtois, previously patroned by Mattias de' Medici. At Yale's death, his collection launched the auction concept in Britain, spacing the sales at a few months' intervals to not overload the art market. His European paintings were the largest group ever sold in England. Catalogues were available at various coffee houses such as Garraways. Van der Werff's painting was acquired by the Earl of Derby, while a bidding war ensued for Queen Mary's ring between the Earl of Oxford and the Earl of Pembroke. Yale's granddaughter married the latter's son, Nicholas Herbert, who lived at Wilton House and Highclere Castle. Inigo Jones's designs were acquired by the 2nd Duke of Devonshire, and are still at Chatsworth House. It is thought that some of Yale's missing paintings are now at the Hermitage Museum in Russia, dating back from Catherine the Great's acquisition of the Walpole collection at Houghton Hall. Numerous works would later be acquired by Yale University, while others went to Madryn Castle, seat of Deputy William Corbet Yale of the Yales of Plas yn Yale.

== Ancestry and coats of arms ==
Elihu Yale's arms, inherited from the Fitzgeralds, became the inspiration for Yale College's arms

Elihu's ancestry, as a member of the Yale family, originated from the Lordship of Yale in North Wales. The Yale name was adopted from the maternal line, while the coat of arms, later adopted by Yale College, came from the paternal line. The Yales derived from the 6th century prince of Powys, Brochwel Ysgithrog, and from the 4th century king Cunedda. Following the division of the Kingdom of Powys during the 12th century, a new principality will emerge named Northern Powys, which will be kept by Elihu's ancestors, the princes of Powys Fadog, Lords of Yale, with their seat at Castle Dinas Bran as members of the House of Mathrafal. They will submit to Edward Longshanks during the 13th century, with prince Gruffudd Fychan losing the lordship of Yale to the Earl of Surrey, William Wallace's rival at Sterling Bridge.

About a century later, his descendant Owain Glyndwr, a cousin of the Tudors, would lose the War of Independence against Henry V, becoming the last Welsh Prince of Wales in 1415. Known by Shakespeare as Owen Glendower, he became the granduncle of baron Elissau ap Gruffudd, founder of the House of Yale in 1480, which Elihu belonged to. Elissau's mother, Lowry ap Tudor, was Glyndwr's niece, while his father, Griffith ap Einion, was a member of the House of Fitzgerald. Elissau would become co-heir of Glyndwr's claims through his mother, including those of Mathrafal (Powys Fadog), which featured the Lordship of Bromfield and Yale. From his marriage to an heiress within the lordship, he received the estate of Allt Llwyn Dragon, which he renamed Plas yn Yale (Yale Manor). The name would then be adopted by his grandson, Chancellor Thomas Yale (b. 1525), and by Elihu's great-grandfather, Chancellor David Yale, Thomas's nephew.

While the Yale name was adopted from baron Elissau's maternal line, the Yale arms would be inherited from his father, a member of the Fitzgeralds of Corsygedol, from the line of Osborne Fitzgerald, initially a Desmond. This line was founded by the marriage of a Welsh princess named Nesta, daughter of Rhys ap Tudor, with Norman lord Gerald de Windsor, son of the first governor of Windsor Castle for William the Conqueror. Two branches will form over time, the Yales of Plas yn Yale, who stayed in Britain, and the Yales of Plas Grono, who went to America in 1637. As Elihu was heir of the Plas Gronos in 1689, his arms would be those later used for Yale College, as well as for the Yale schools of Public Health, Environment and Medicine.

== Cultural references ==
- Elihu later became the name of a "senior society" founded in 1903 at Yale.
- Tom Wolfe, who earned a Ph.D. in American Studies from Yale, named the African-American Atlanta police chief in A Man in Full Elihu Yale.
- Yale College, a former college in Wrexham, Wales, which has since merged with Coleg Cambria, was also named after Elihu Yale.
- Theodore Roosevelt's son Quentin kept a hyacinth macaw named Eli Yale.

== Notes ==
Preceded by William Gyfford; Agent	President of Madras; 8 August 1684 – 26 January 1685	Succeeded by William Gyfford
Preceded by William Gyfford	President of Madras; 25 July 1687 – 3 October 1692	Succeeded by Nathaniel Higginson
