= Stransham family =

There have been various famous members of the Stransham family:

- Anthony Blaxland Stransham (d. 1900), general, leader of the Royal Marines during the First Opium War
- Edward Stransham (c. 1557–1586), English Roman Catholic priest and Catholic martyr
- Streynsham Master (1640–1724), pioneer in the British East India Company
