= Nathaniel Higginson =

English politician (1652-1708)

President of Fort St George (Madras)
- In office 3 October 1692 – 7 July 1698
- Preceded by: Elihu Yale
- Succeeded by: Thomas Pitt

Personal details
- Born: 11 October 1652 Guilford, Connecticut Colony
- Died: 31 October 1708 (aged 56) London, Kingdom of Great Britain
- Spouse: Elizabeth Richards

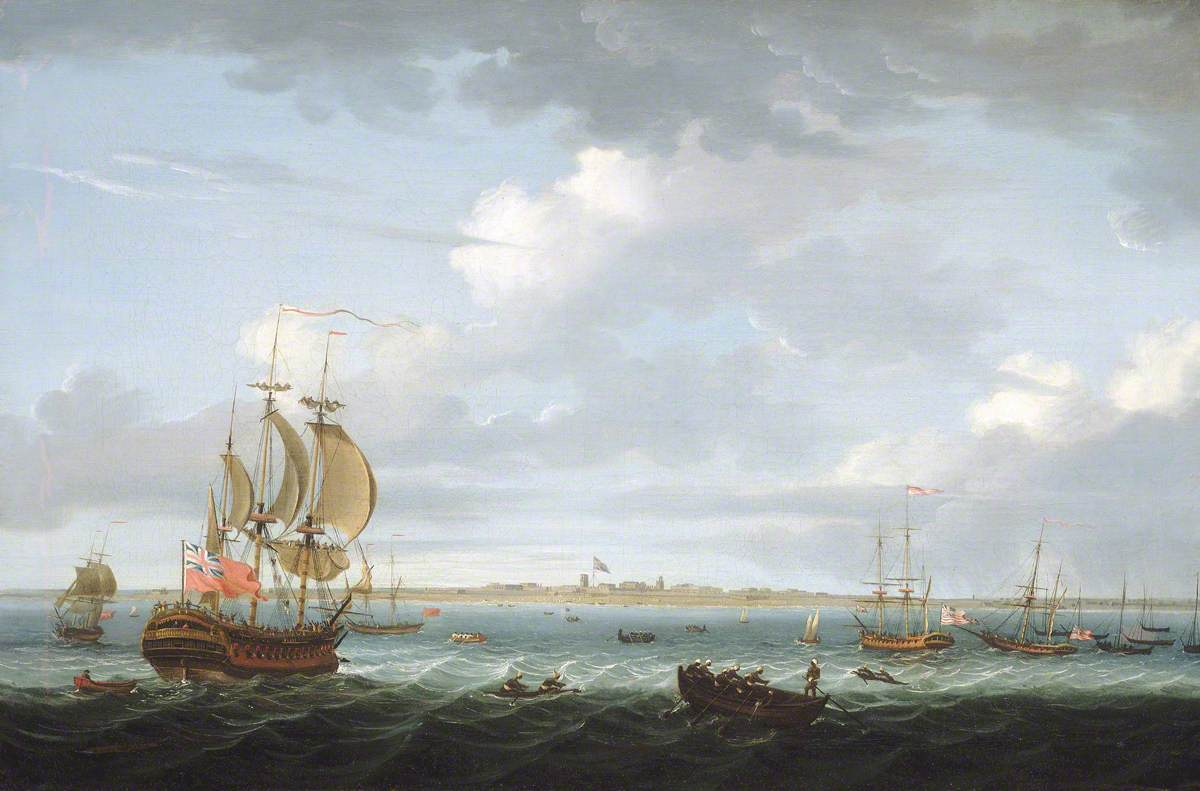
Fort St. George, Madras

Nathaniel Higginson (11 October 1652 – 31 October 1708) was an English politician and a scion of the Higginson family of Salem, Massachusetts who served as the first Mayor of Madras, and later as the President of the colony from 3 October 1692 to 7 July 1698.

== Early life ==
Nathaniel Higginson was born at Guilford, Connecticut Colony in a family of American pioneers. His grandfather Francis Higginson was the first Minister of the First Church of Salem, Massachusetts from 1629 to 1630 while his father Rev. John Higginson served as Minister of the First Church from 1660 to 1708. Rev. John Higginson was a leading investigator in the Salem witch trials of 1692–1693 which witnessed the prosecution of his own daughter and Nathaniel's sister Ann Doliver on charges of practising witchcraft.

Nathaniel Higginson graduated in M.A. from Harvard College in 1670. In 1674, he moved to England where he worked for seven years in service of Lord Wharton as steward and tutor to his children. In 1681, he was employed at the Mint in the Tower where he served till 1683, when he joined the service of the British East India Company and travelled to Madras. Soon, he was appointed to the Council of Fort St George. In 1687, when the Corporation of Madras was created, Nathaniel Higginson – who was the Second member of the Council – became the first Mayor.

Nathaniel Higginson married Elizabeth Richards in 1692.

== First Mayor of Madras ==
The plan for setting up a corporation in Madras was first detailed by Josiah Child, the President of the Board of Directors of the British East India Company, in a letter addressed to the factors at Madras on 28 September 1687. Three months later, Josiah Child and his deputy had an audience with James II, and as per the ensuing discussions, a Charter was issued by the king on 30 December 1687 which established the Corporation of Madras. The charter came into effect on 29 September 1688, and Nathaniel Higginson – who was then the second member of the Council of Fort St George – took office as the Mayor of Madras.

Nathaniel Higginson resigned as Mayor of Madras after a short term of six months, and was succeeded by Littleton.

== Tenure as President of Madras ==
On 3 October 1692, Nathaniel Higginson succeeded Elihu Yale as the President of Madras. Meanwhile, during the same year, the Mughal army besieged the Marathas in the fortress of Gingee but was defeated in December. The Mughal general Zulfiqar Khan Nusrat Jung failed to take the fort and retired with some troops to Vandavasi while other troops sought protection in Madras. He approached the British for negotiating a deal with the Marathas. The British at Madras, however, refused to get involved. In August 1693, the Dutch invaded the French settlement of Pondicherry and conquered it. The administration in Madras responded by sending a congratulatory message to the Dutch in Pulicat over the successful siege of Pondicherry.

It was during Higginson's tenure that the British East India Company obtained a firman from Nawab Zulfiqar Khan for the settlements of Egmore, Purasawalkam and Triplicane.

In July 1694, there broke a dispute between two chief Muslim clerics of Blacktown over the division of revenues which Higginson helped settle in an amicable way.

In February 1696, Elihu Yale petitioned the Court of Directors once again over the unjust way in which he had been tried by the Council of Fort St George. Higginson responded by replying to the Board of Directors refuting Yale's allegations of injustice.

In November 1694, Nawab Zulfiqar Khan proceeded from Wandiwash where he was encamped and took Chungramon Fort. However, dissent broke out in the ranks of the Mughal army and there were rumors of royal orders being dispatched to Daud Khan Panni to capture Nawab Zulfiqar Khan. In March 1696, Nawab Zulfiqar Khan sent messengers to Madras demanding one-lakh pagodas.

Zulfiqar Khan was increasingly frustrated when the British of Madras refused to present him the demanded amount. He attempted to destroy the trade of the colony by seizing its goods and imposing stringent customs. He even gave orders to the Havaldar of Thiruvallur to mobilize his troops in case of war. The Council of Fort St George met on 31 October 1696 and conveyed their outright rejection of the Nawab's demands even if it meant going to war. However, Madras was saved when fresh orders were received by Zulfiqar Khan in late 1696 from the Mughal Emperor Aurangzeb to proceed to Gingee. Thus, a major face-off was averted. Zulfiqar Khan, meanwhile, concentrated his energies against the Marathas and won a decisive victory at Gingee returning to Wandiwash only for his marriage in 1698. Nathaniel Higginson sent him rich marriage presents and a congratulatory message on his victory over the Marathas.

Throughout his tenure, despite being a Protestant, Higginson was fairly tolerant towards his Hindu subjects as well as the Roman Catholics of St Thome. He repealed the extortionary taxation system which his predecessor Elihu Yale had introduced in the revenue system of the Hindu shrines of Blacktown and Triplicane. He also maintained regular correspondence with the Roman Catholic bishop of St Thome.

It was during Higginson's Presidency (in 1693) that the Madras Secretariat was constructed to host the offices of the Council of Fort St George. It was also during this time that a channel was cut in order to interlink the North River with the Coovum. It was this interlinking of the two rivers which created "the Island".

Higginson's Presidency came to an end on 7 July 1698, and he was succeeded by Thomas Pitt.

== Later life ==
Nathaniel Higginson returned to England with his wife and four children in the year 1700 and established himself as a merchant in London. In 1706, he affixed his signature to a petition against Joseph Dudley, the Colonial Governor of Massachusetts. But Dudley discarded Higginson's petition with contempt as a complaint from someone who "may be presumed to nothing of the country". The allegations were similarly discarded by the Council as a "wicked and scandalous accusation". Alienated from his home country, Higginson spent the rest of his life in England and died of smallpox on 31 October 1708.

Preceded by Elihu Yale	President of Madras; 3 October 1692 – 7 July 1698	Succeeded by Thomas Pitt
