= Catherine Nicks =

English merchant

Catherine Nicks (died 1709) was an English businessperson. She has been referred to as the first woman entrepreneur in Madras.

She was listed in 1678 as one of five English single women in Madras. She married John Nicks (d. 1711), an associate of governor Elihu Yale, with whom she had four children.

Despite being a married woman and thereby under the guardianship of her husband, Catherine Nicks conducted business in her own named independently from her spouse and was active as a merchant, having invoices and accounts in her own name, trading in textiles and diamonds. It appears as she acted as the business agent of Yale, selling supplies embezzled from the company. From 1689, when the governor's wife had returned to England, Catherine Nicks and Jacques (Jaime) de Paiva (Pavia)'s widow Hieronima da Paivia acted as the first ladies of the governor's residence. Her own husband was away as head of the company's interests at Connimere.

In 1692, Elihu Yale deposed as governor and faced enquiries, while John Nicks was arrested. Catherine Nicks retired with Yale and Hieronima de Paiva to Yale's garden house, creating a scandal. She was put on trial and fined for having sold wares from the company's godowns on Yale's private account. She was allowed to depart for England, and was joined by Yale, who brought with him her spouse and children, in 1699. The Nicks returned to Madras, where she continued as the business agent of Yale.
