= William Gyfford =

Agent of Madras
- In office 3 July 1681 – 8 August 1684
- Preceded by: Streynsham Master
- Succeeded by: Elihu Yale

President of Madras
- In office 26 January 1685 – 25 July 1687
- Preceded by: Elihu Yale
- Succeeded by: Elihu Yale

Personal details
- Occupation: lawyer, administrator
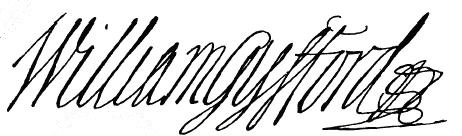
- Signature

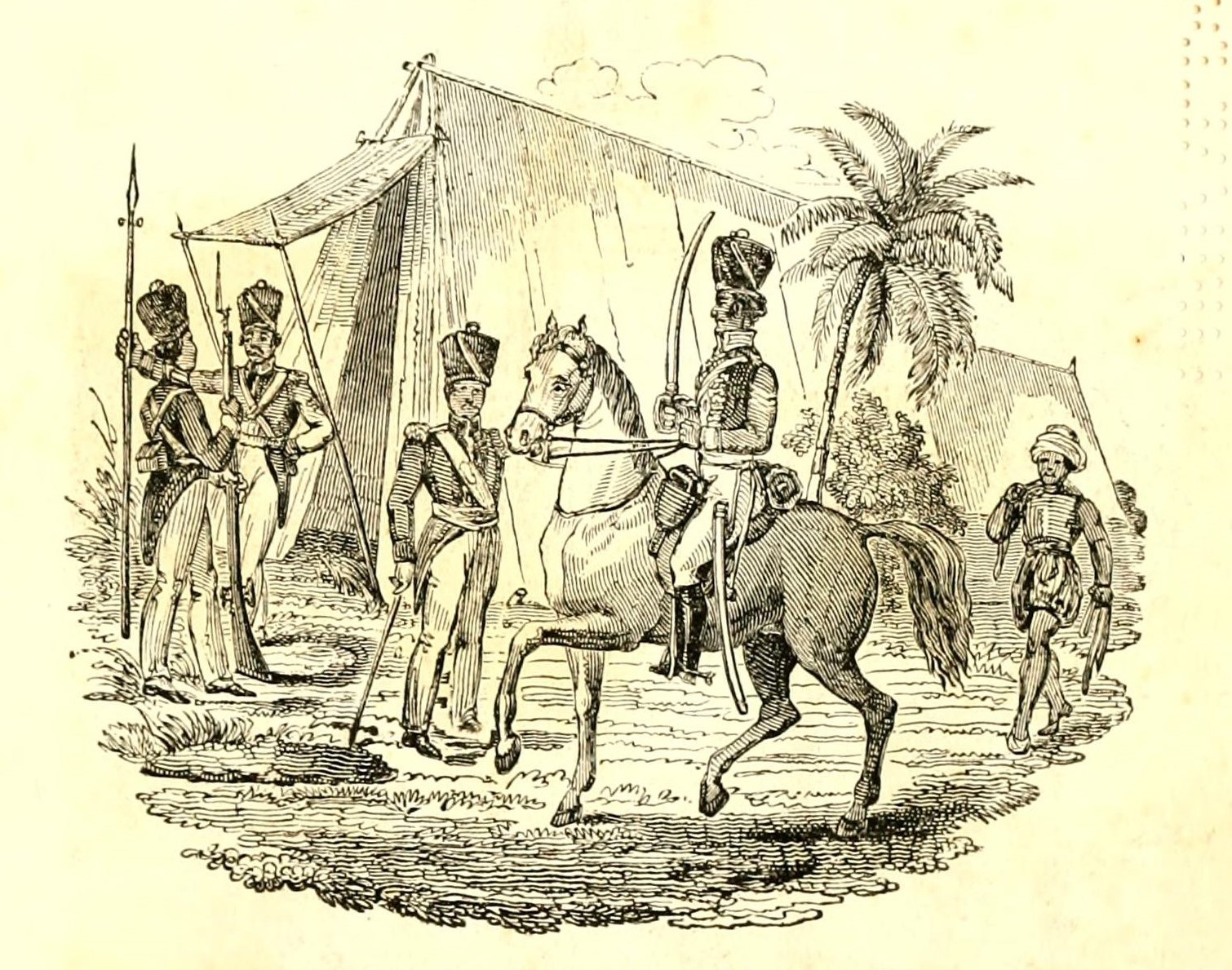
A group of Madras Native Soldiers

William Gyfford was an English factor and Agent of Madras from 3 July 1681 to 8 August 1684 and the President of Madras from 26 January 1685 to 25 July 1687.

William Gyfford was associated with the East India Company's factory at Madras right from the time of its inception. He was made a factor of the East India Company in December 1657 and in 1662 became also a member of Council of Fort St George.

== Tenure as Agent of Madras ==
On the removal of Streynsham Master on charges of private trade in the year 1681, William Gyfford was made the Agent of Madras. He was more or less a puppet of the authorities in England, most importantly, Josiah Child.

=== Peace with Lingappa ===
Gyfford ended hostilities with Lingappa, the Naik of Poonamallee by proposing peace with him. Lingappa seeing his chance demanded a huge amount in return for his friendship and help in curbing private trade and other criminal activities. The Company agreed and paid him 7,000 pagodas. A firman was signed by the Naik of Poonamallee on behalf of the Sultan of Golconda providing a new cowle for the district of Madraspatnam at the rate of 1,200 pagodas per annum.

On 12 November 1683, a messenger from the Sultan of Golconda arrived at the Company's garden house and was greeted by a volley of gunshots. Amidst celebration and excitement the firman was signed.

=== Reforms ===
Under extreme pressure from Josiah Childe, William Gyfford introduced reforms to increase the revenues of the East India Company. The Madras Bank was established on 21 June 1683 with a capital of one hundred thousand pounds sterling. This bank lent money to the citizens of Madras at six percent interest. The Madras Bank, which later became the Bank of Madras in 1843 and eventually merged with the Bank of Bengal and the Bank of Bombay to form the Imperial Bank of India in 1921 is the oldest European-style banking institution in India

Gyfford also introduced a law to curb the slave trade in the Agency of Fort St George. The trade in slaves was made punishable by law and a Court of Admiralty was established to try offenders on 10 July 1684 thereby replacing the Court of Judicature that had been established by Streynsham Master in which the Agent passed judgement over interlopers and slave traders.

On 8 August 1684, Madras was elevated to a Presidency and Elihu Yale made its First President.

== Tenure as second President of Madras ==
William Gyfford succeeded Elihu Yale was the second President of Madras on 26 January 1685. Under pressure from Josiah Child and the Board of Directors of the East India Company, he imposed stringent taxes on the inhabitants of the settlement. The house tax which had been in vogue since the times of Streynsham Master was standardized and strictly enforced and defaulters punished.

=== Rebellion against taxation ===
In January 1686, a rebellion broke out amongst the disgruntled people of Madras over the stringent taxation. The clerks, weavers and dubashes under the pay of the Company revolted and threatened to boycott their jobs. William Gyfford responded sternly and placed all the entrances to the city under heavy guard. A proclamation was issued and read out to the public. According to this proclamation, the administration threatened to banish all those who refused to pay the taxes. The grain merchants of the city were threatened with confiscation of their goods if they did not sell their grain. The next day (4 January 1686), a compromise was reached by which the inhabitants of Madras submitted and agreed to pay the taxes.

=== Mutiny of the army ===
On 4 August 1686 the Portuguese soldiers in the service of the East India Company deputed to serve in the war in Bengal refused to embark on their journey under the suspicion that the factors actually intended to send them to revive an abandoned settlement in West Sumatra which had fallen to a mysterious epidemic. When the authorities tried to force them, a mutiny broke out. The administration responded by arresting the ringleaders and executing them. The rebellion eventually subsided within a few days.

=== Famine ===
In 1686, a terrible famine broke out in Madras. Out of an estimated population of 300,000, 35,000 died and over 6,000 families were forced to migrate from the city.

=== Mughal conquest of Golconda ===
With death of Shivaji in 1680, Maratha power in the Deccan began to decline and the Mughal Emperor Aurangzeb lead a huge expedition to the South to recover lost territories. In 1686, Aurangazeb's son Muazzam launched an invasion of Golconda culminating in the siege and the eventual conquest of the capital in September 1687. The forces of Golconda, however, defended stoutly for over seven months, during which the whole of Golconda was gripped by fear of invasion and carnage.

The factors of Madras, who had been faithful allies of Golconda, anticipating an invasion, applied to England for help. They also persuaded the factory at Calcutta, which had a stronger contingent and greater influence, to negotiate with Aurangazeb. However, even before the siege of Golconda came to an end and before Aurangazeb was free to direct his energies towards minor allies of the Sultan of Golconda, Gyfford was recalled and replaced by Elihu Yale as the President of Madras.

Preceded by Streynsham Master	Agent of Madras; 3 July 1681 – 8 August 1684	Succeeded by Elihu Yale; President
Preceded by Elihu Yale	President of Madras; 26 January 1685 – 25 July 1687	Succeeded by Elihu Yale
