= Elihu Yale with Members of his Family and an Enslaved Child =

Elihu Yale with members of his family and an enslaved child
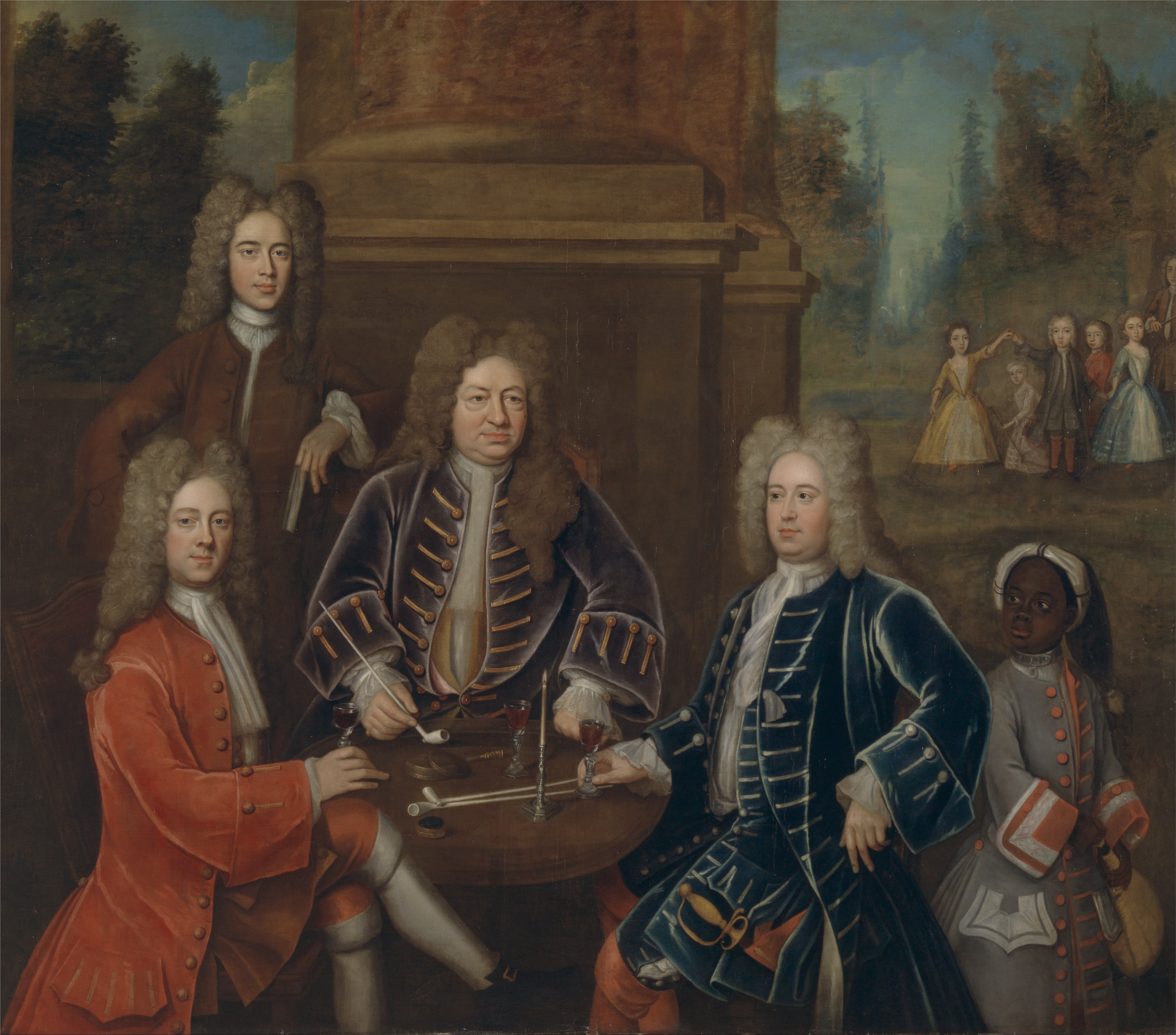
- Artist: John Verelst (attributed)
- Year: c. 1719
- Medium: Oil on canvas
- Dimensions: 201.3 cm × 235.6 cm (79.3 in × 92.8 in)
- Location: Yale Center for British Art, New Haven, Connecticut
- Accession: B1970.1
- Website: https://collections.britishart.yale.edu/catalog/tms:107

Elihu Yale with Members of his Family and an Enslaved Child (formerly titled Elihu Yale seated at table with the Second Duke of Devonshire and Lord James Cavendish) is a group portrait of Elihu Yale with William Cavendish and his brother James in England. It is currently in the collection of the Yale Center for British Art. It is attributed to John Verelst and has been dated to 1719.

== Date ==
For many years it was believed to have been painted around 1708; but the discovery of Prussian blue in the coat of Dudley North has led the work to be redated to between 1719 and 1721.

== Description ==
Yale University own seven portraits and a snuffbox depicting Yale; three of the paintings depict enslaved people. Self-portraits featuring enslaved people were popular during his lifetime, although there is no proof Yale ever owned slaves. George Washington, 1st President of the United States, had many portraits of himself with slaves. At the time, these self-portraits were often used as a way to project the subject as a man of empire or wealth.

A portrait of Yale with an Indian servant was removed from Yale's Corporation Room in 2007 due to its negative racial implications.

== History and analysis ==
This is the larger of two versions at Yale, both presumably commissioned on the occasion of Yale's daughter Anne's betrothal to Lord James Cavendish. The work has been perceived as having been created to improve Yale's image amid criticism of his unjust enrichment with the East India Company and resultant aristocratic resentment at his wealth. The larger version was acquired as a gift in 1970 by Andrew Cavendish, 11th Duke of Devonshire, from the collection at Chatsworth House, having come down through family inheritance. It was formally the first painting to enter Yale's collection. The smaller version on copper was acquired by the Yale University Art Gallery in 1954 from Mrs. Anna R. Butler, a donor from Bedford, NY who also founded the Arthur W. Butler Memorial Sanctuary in Mount Kisco. It was possibly commissioned by Yale himself. The larger version was the subject of a commentary on the history of slavery in cultural images by Jonathan Holloway. It was also the subject of a commentary on the history of the Empire in India by Romita Ray. She points out that it is Yale himself looking out of the painting at the viewer, dressed as if he was also of the same class as the Duke of Devonshire on his left. He is recognizable from his diamond ring, which is one of the many expensive objects he brought back from India.

Research into the painting was commissioned in 2019 by the director of the Yale museum, Courtney J. Martin. She has said that people contacted her to express revulsion at the painting which she said was initially " ... hard for me to hear because from my vantage as an art historian. It's a minor painting by a minor artist, and we have major paintings by major artists". Martin has felt that contemporary viewers perceive the displaying of the portrait by the museum as validating the enslavement of the child depicted saying that "The public says, everything you put up, you believe in, 100%. ... I don't think that's true for this painting at all ... It's hard for me as an art historian to give this painting credence".

== Sitters ==
The painting depicts Elihu Yale at its centre. The left foreground is occupied by Lord James Cavendish. The man to the left of Yale is believed to be David Yale, Yale's chosen heir due to his lack of a son. He replaced a landscape part of the painting, being added at a later date than the others. The man was originally thought to have been James Tunstall, a lawyer who was negotiating the marriage of Yale's daughter Anne to Lord James Cavendish. To the right of Yale is Dudley North, the husband of Catherine, Yale's daughter. He had previously been believed to be Lord William Cavendish.

The violinist who plays to Yale's dancing grandchildren is believed to be Obadiah Shuttleworth who taught Yale's grandchildren music and dancing.

== Identity of unknown enslaved child ==
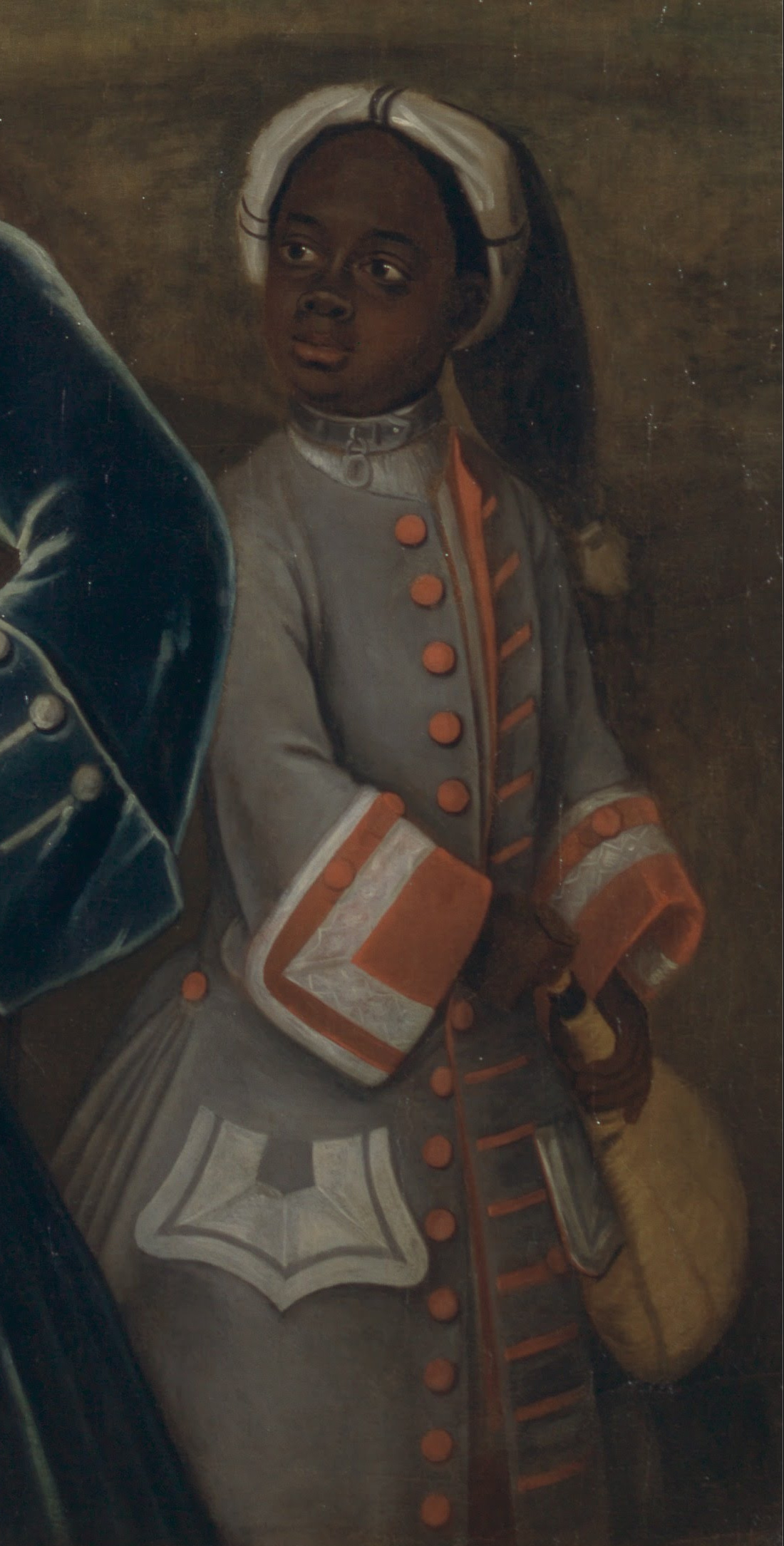
The black pageboy standing near the table is wearing a silver dog collar. Black pageboys appear in European group portraits with and without such collars from the 1660s onwards.

The painting depicts an enslaved black child, believed to be aged around 10 years old. He wears a silver collar with padlock around his neck. The child is thought to have been enslaved in Africa and would have worked as a pageboy in one of the wealthy households of the primary sitters of the portrait. His identity is unknown, and research has been conducted into the baptismal, marriage and burial records of the London Borough of Camden to attempt to establish his identity.

In 2018, artist Titus Kaphar produced Enough About You, a reimagining of the original that focuses on the enslaved boy, and not the white men. In Kaphar's version, the boy is framed in gold and meets the viewer's gaze, while the section of canvas containing the white men is crumpled beyond recognition.

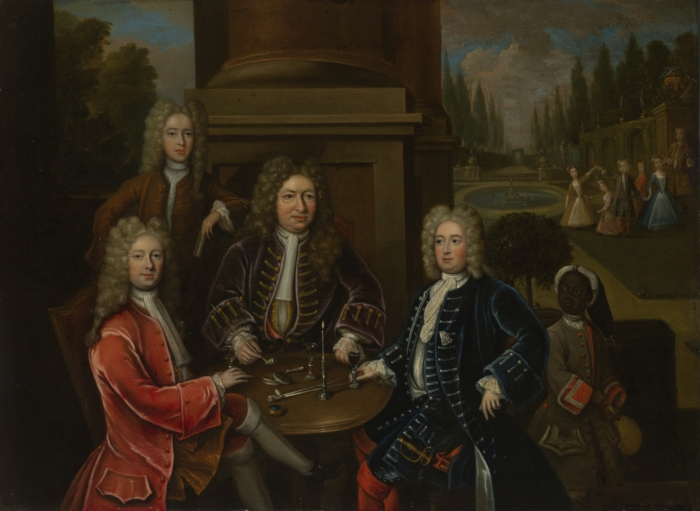
Smaller version on copper

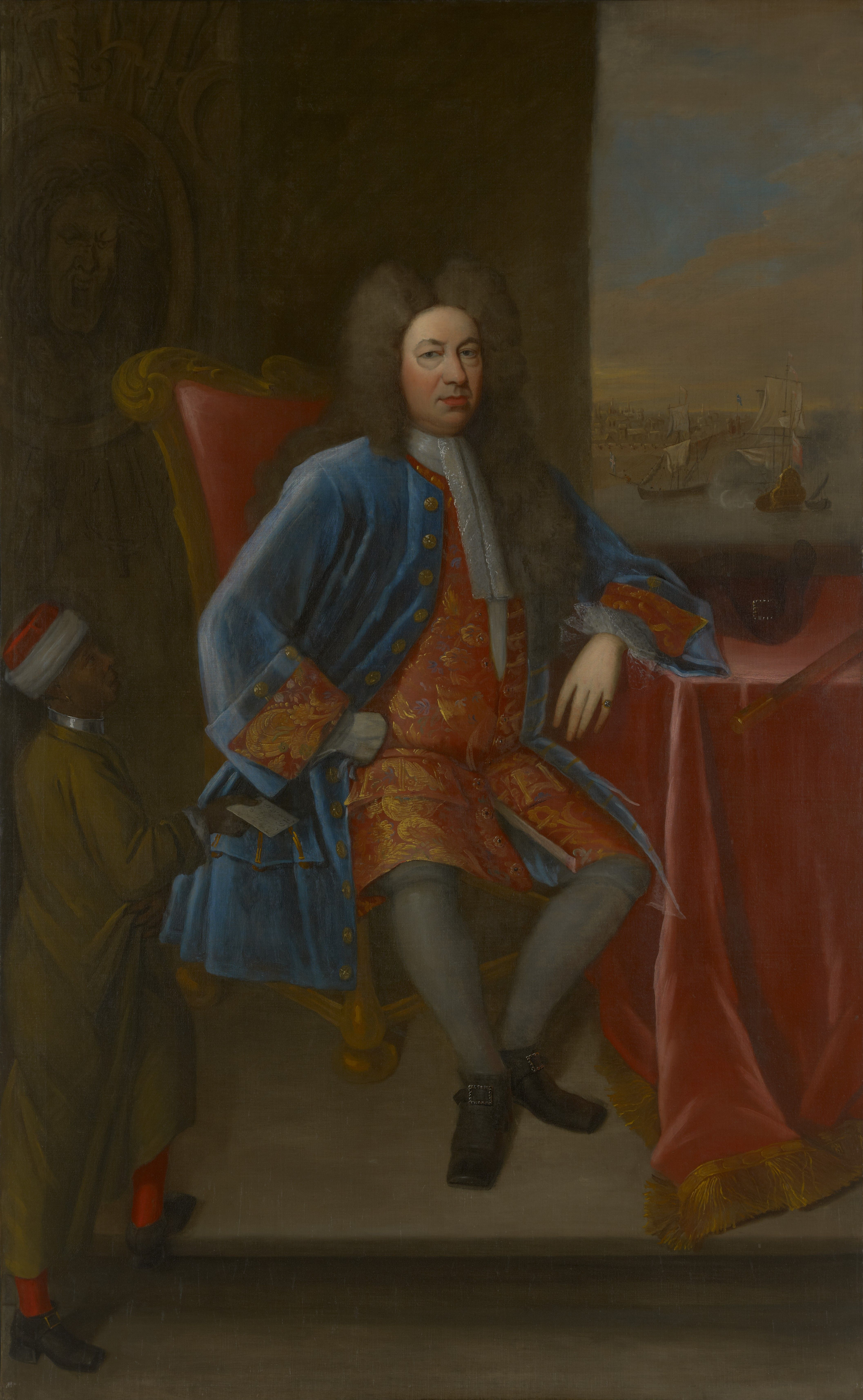
Elihu Yale with his Servant, by James Worsdale

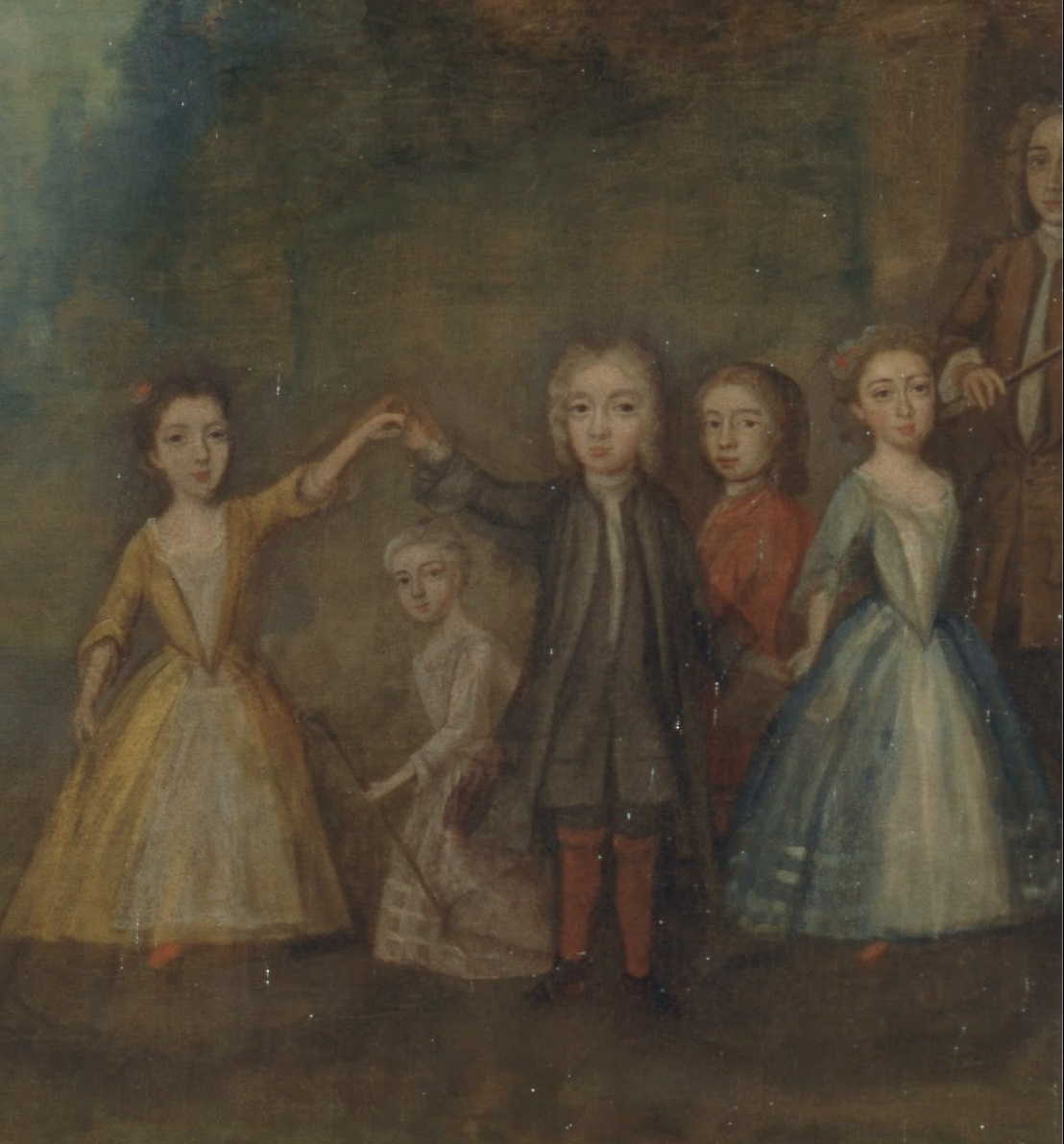
Anne herself is probably among the children playing in the upper right

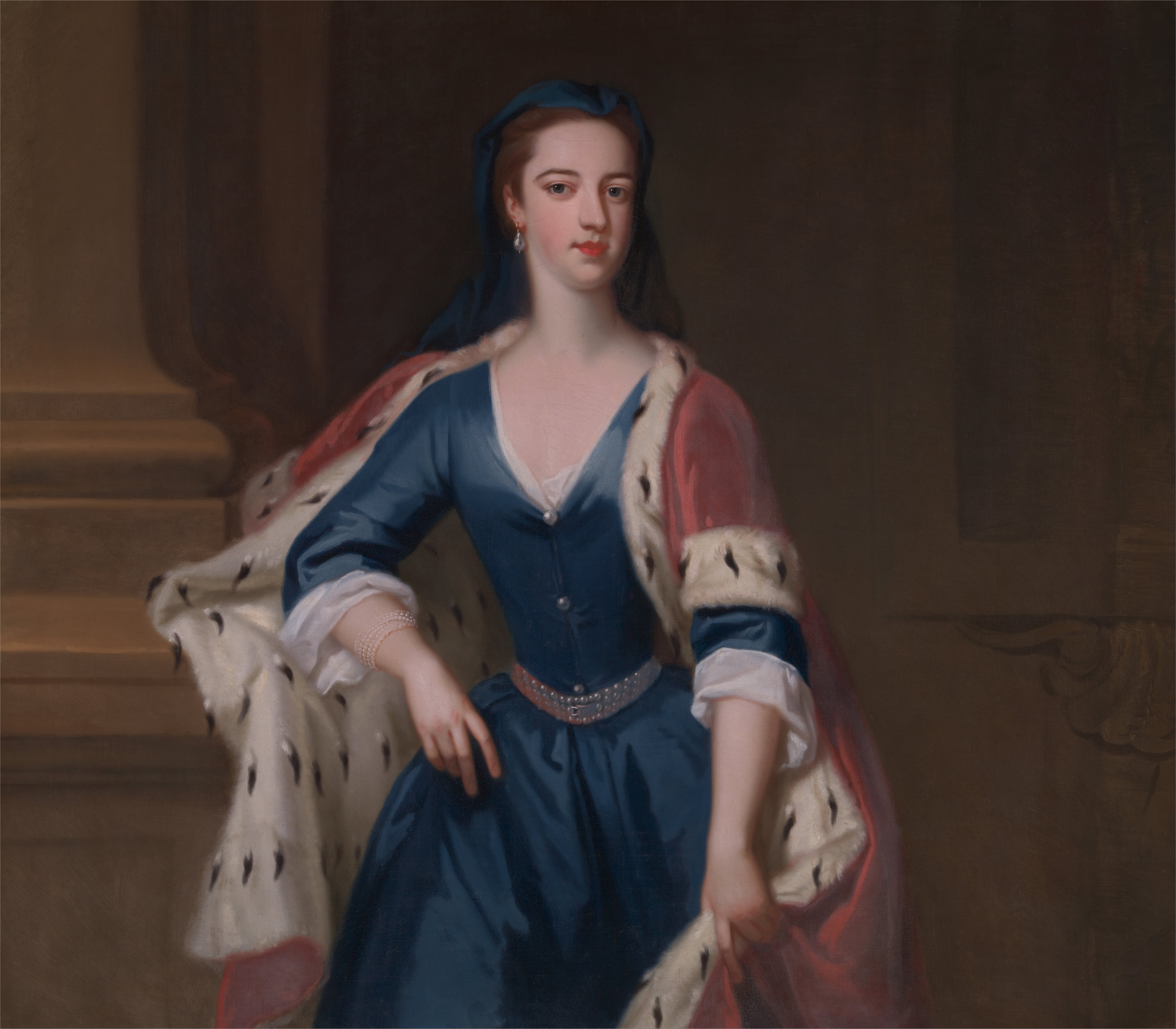
Lady Anne Cavendish, by Jonathan Richardson the Elder, c. 1725

== See also ==
- Olympia, an 1863 painting by Édouard Manet that contains an oft-overlooked black maid
