= Streynsham Master =

British colonial administrator in Madras (1640–1724)

Sir Streynsham Master
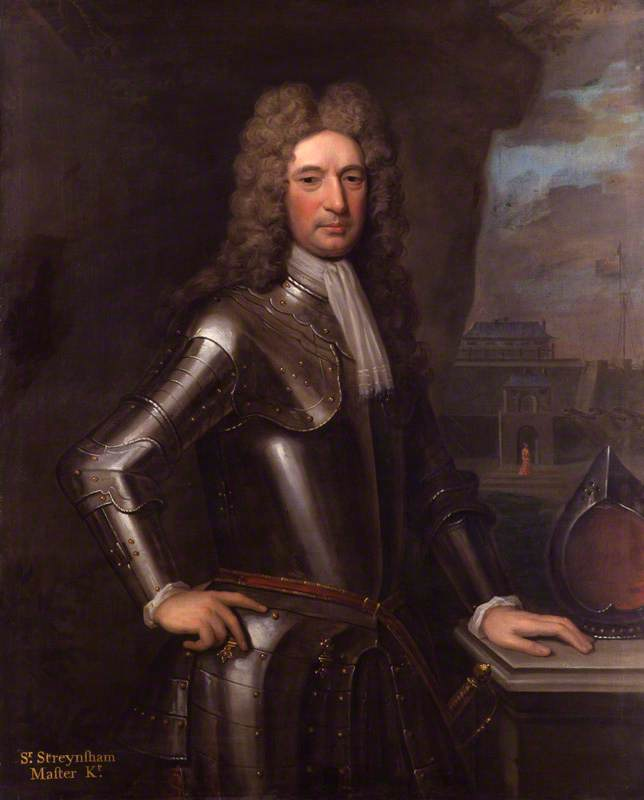

Agent of Madras
- In office 27 January 1678 – 3 July 1681
- Preceded by: Sir William Langhorne
- Succeeded by: William Gyfford

Personal details
- Born: 28 October 1640 Langdon, Kent, England
- Died: 28 April 1724 (aged 83) Lancashire, England
- Spouse: Elizabeth Leigh
- Children: 3
- Occupation: Colonial administrator

Sir Streynsham Master (28 October 1640 – 28 April 1724) was an English colonial administrator who was one of the 17th-century pioneers of the English East India Company. He served as the Agent of Madras from 27 January 1678 to 3 July 1681, and is credited with having introduced the first administrative reforms in the Madras Government. He banned sati and prohibited the burning of a Hindu widow in 1680 in what is the first official British response to sati. He made English the sole official language and language of court in the Madras Presidency, replacing the Portuguese, Tamil and Malayalam languages.

Returning to England, in 1692 he bought the Codnor Castle estate and for the rest of his life divided his time between Derbyshire and London.

== Early career ==
Streynsham Master had a distinguished career in the East India Company (EIC) right from his early days. He served as the Acting President of the company's factory (trading post) at Surat during the visit of the factory's President Gerald Aungier to the new colony at Bombay. After the return of Aungier, Master served for some time as a member of the EIC Council. In 1670 he led the English in the successful defence of his company in Surat against the Marathas. In 1676, even before the then Agent Sir William Langhorne's removal from power, Master was nominated in advance as the next Agent of Madras in the case of emergency. In the meantime, until the end of Langhorne's tenure, Master served for a time as the Agent of the company's factory at Masulipatnam and then Bengal, where he was tasked with introducing a new administrative system for the factories on the Hooghly River; lastly he was sent back to Fort St. George to take office as the second member of the EIC Council.

== Tenure as Agent of Madras ==
=== Shivaji's Campaign ===
In August 1678, the Maratha Emperor Shivaji sent an army of 1,500 horse to capture Poonamallee. While the Maratha army camped near Kanchipuram, news reached the Council at Fort St George by means of the company's spies that the Marathas intended to proceed upon Madras, Sadras and Pulicat. However, the information proved to be false as the Maratha troops immediately returned to the north from whence they came after the siege of Poonamallee.

=== Foundation of St Mary's Church ===
The foundations of St Mary's church, the oldest Anglican church in Madras, were laid during the Agency of Streynsham Master. The foundation of the church was laid on Lady Day, 1678. The construction of the church was completed in two and a half years and it opened on 28 October 1680.

=== Lingappa Naik's Demands ===
In August 1678 Lingappa Naik, the Naik of Poonamallee, demanded a large sum of money from the EIC. The company's merchant, Kasi Veeranna (Casa Verona), declined and sent him a harsh reply. A month later, when Lingappa visited Kasi Veeranna to express his condolences on the death of the former's wife, he asked the latter the reason why the Agent had not sent anyone to receive. To this Kasi Veeranna delivered an extremely arrogant reply which left the Naik fuming with anger.

When Kasi Veeranna died in 1680, Lingappa sent a Havildar named Shakeel Ahmed to take over the settlement of Madras from the company. He was promptly arrested by the company's troops and dispatched across the frontier. Following this act by the English, Lingappa blockaded Madras and prevented goods and supplies from entering the settlement. He demanded that the English agree to pay him an annual tribute of 2,000 pagodas in order to lift the embargo. At one point of time, the situation became so serious that the Directors of the Council even contemplated the thought of moving the company's factory to Gingee. Neither food nor fuel could be obtained, and the inhabitants starved.

On 9 April 1681 Lieutenant Richardson was sent with fifty of the company's troops to Gingee. Richardson reached the village of Khandur and besieged the town. At about midnight, Richardson took the town and drove away the Polygar. The required amount of provisions were obtained and transported back to Madras.

On 3 July 1681 Streynsham Master was replaced with William Gyfford as the Agent of Madras.

=== Reforms ===
The population of Madras had increased to the point that it seemed difficult to retain the old Choultry courts. Hence, in 1678, the Government of Fort St George set up a judiciary with the Agent and the members of the council as judges. Two English Choultry judges were appointed to hear cases concerning their Indian subjects.

Master is credited with having introduced the role of a scavenger who was required to remove the dirt and filth of the streets. Scavengers were also empowered to collect the house-tax and other taxes. Watchmen were appointed to guard the settlement at night. Taverns, hotels, entertainment-houses and theatres had to be licensed.

== Family ==
He was the son of Richard Master of East Langdon, near Dover, Kent. He married Elizabeth, daughter of Richard Legh of Lyme Hall, Cheshire with whom he had two sons, Legh Master, MP for Newton, Lancashire, and Rev. Streynsham Master, M.A., and a daughter, Anne. In 1692 he purchased the Codnor Castle estate in Derbyshire. He served as High Sheriff of Derbyshire in 1712. Master and his wife resided at Stanley Grange in Morley in Derbyshire. His nephew – the son of his elder brother, James Master – was a Royal Navy captain also named Streynsham Master. Among his descendants are Admiral Sir Nicholas John Streynsham Hunt and his son Jeremy Hunt, an MP since 2005, Foreign Secretary from 2018 to 2019, Conservative leadership candidate in 2019, and Chancellor of the Exchequer from 2022 to 2024.

== See also ==
- Stransham family

Preceded by Sir William Langhorne, 1st Baronet	Agent of Madras; 1678–1681	Succeeded by William Gyfford
