= Sir Thomas Frankland, 2nd Baronet =

English politician (1665–1726)

Sir Thomas Frankland, 2nd Baronet (September 1665 – 30 October 1726), of Thirkleby Hall in Yorkshire, was an English landowner and Whig politician who sat in the English and British House of Commons from 1685 to 1711. He was joint Postmaster General from 1691 to 1715.

== Early life ==
Frankland was the eldest son of Sir William Frankland, 1st Baronet and his wife Arabella Belasyse, daughter of Hon. Henry Belasyse MP of Newburgh Priory, Yorkshire. He was at Cambridge University from 1680 to 1681 and was admitted at Lincoln's Inn in 1683. He married Elizabeth Russell, daughter of Sir John Russell and Frances Cromwell (daughter of Oliver Cromwell), by licence dated 14 February 1683.

== Career ==
Frankland entered Parliament at the 1685 English general election as Member of Parliament for Thirsk as a substitute for his father who was known as an exclusionist. He played no part in parliament, but was returned again at the 1689 English general election. He was appointed a Commissioner for excise in April 1689, but lost the post in October when he was unable to subscribe to a government loan.

Frankland was returned again as a Whig MP for Thirsk at the 1690 English general election and in February 1691 was appointed joint Postmaster-General with Sir Robert Cotton, a Tory, the post having been split to be shared between a Whig and a Tory. He held the post until 1715 and proved an assiduous postmaster, making many improvements, particularly with regard to overseas mail. However his Parliamentary activity was slight. He did not stand at the 1695 English general election, but was returned instead as MP for Hedon in a by-election on 7 December 1695. He signed the Association in February 1696 and voted with the Court for fixing the price of guineas at 22 shillings in March. He and Cotton were charged with improving laws related to the post office. He voted for the attainder of Sir John Fenwick on 25 November 1696. On the death of his father on 2 August 1697, he succeeded to the baronetcy. At the 1698 English general election he was returned again as MP for Thirsk. He presented a petition to the House of Commons on 23 February 1699, from the inhabitants and clothiers of Halifax, with regard to woollen manufacture.

Frankland was returned unopposed again for Thirsk at the two general elections of 1701 and at the 1702 English general election. He started to use his interest in Yorkshire and in the Post Office to influence the results at other constituencies. At the 1705 English general election, he was returned unopposed for Thirsk again. He voted for the Court candidate for Speaker on 25 October 1705, and supported the Court in the proceedings on the 'place clause' of the regency bill on 18 February 1706. He was returned again for Thirsk at the 1708 British general election and supported the naturalization of the Palatines. He became involved in the attempt of Dumfries Burgh to have their postal service to Carlisle established by Act of Parliament. The issue became wrapped up in the general attempts to improve the Union and other procedural matters and was lost in that parliament. Meanwhile, Frankland voted for the impeachment of Dr Sacheverell. He was returned again for Thirsk at the 1710 British general election and on 18 February 1711 he was appointed to the committee to draft a bill to establish a General Post Office for Great Britain and the dominions. At about this time he discovered that a clause in the first Lottery Act made his post as joint postmaster incompatible with a seat in Parliament. After voting against an amendment to the South Sea bill on 25 May 1711, he vacated his seat in Parliament.

Frankland kept his place as joint postmaster-general until 1715 after the accession of George I, and was appointed as a Commissioner for customs until 1718 when he was too infirm to carry on. He was then given a pension of £500 a year. He retired from public life. In 1722 he rebuilt the church at Thirkleby at his own expense.

== Death and legacy ==
Frankland died on 30 October 1726, in his 62nd year, and was buried at Thirkleby. He left his lands to his eldest son Thomas, and more than £13,000 divided between his other legatees, including his surviving family, servants and tenants He and his wife had nine children:

- Thomas Frankland FRS (c. 1685–1747), who succeeded his father in the baronetcy and was also MP for Thirsk and for Harwich
- William Frankland FRS (died 1714), Treasurer of the Stamp Office
- John, died young in Hamburg
- Henry Frankland, Governor of Bengal (died 1728), father of Sir Charles Frankland, 4th Baronet, and Sir Thomas Frankland, 5th Baronet
- Richard Frankland DCL (died 1761), Commissioner of the Salt Office
- Frederick Meinhardt Frankland (c. 1694–1768), barrister-at-law, MP for Thirsk
- Robert Frankland, murdered in India
- Mary (died 1722), who married Thomas Worsley of Hovingham Hall
- Frances, who married Roger Talbot

Two of his sons sat for Thirsk between 1713 and 1749

Thirkleby Hall was rebuilt in 1790, and Thirkleby Church was replaced in 1851.

Parliament of England
Preceded by Sir William Frankland; Sir William Ayscough	Member of Parliament for Thirsk; 1685–1695; With: Sir Hugh Cholmeley 1685–1689; Richard Staines 1689–1695	Succeeded by Sir Godfrey Copley; Richard Staines
Preceded by Lord Spencer; Sir William Trumbull	Member of Parliament for Hedon; 1695–1698; With: Hugh Bethell	Succeeded by Hugh Bethell; Anthony Duncombe
Preceded by Sir Godfrey Copley; Richard Staines	Member of Parliament for Thirsk; 1698–1707; With: Sir Godfrey Copley	Succeeded by Parliament of Great Britain
Parliament of Great Britain
Preceded by Parliament of England	Member of Parliament for Thirsk; 1707–1711; With: Sir Godfrey Copley 1707–1709; Leonard Smelt 1709–1710; Ralph Bell 1710–1711	Succeeded by Ralph Bell; Thomas Worsley
Baronetage of England
Preceded by William Frankland	Baronet (of Thirkelby); 1697–1726	Succeeded by Thomas Frankland
