= Sir Thomas Frankland, 3rd Baronet =

English Whig politician

Sir Thomas Frankland, 3rd Baronet (c. 1685 – 17 April 1747), of Thirkleby in Yorkshire, was an English Whig politician who sat in the British House of Commons for over 30 years between 1708 and 1741.

== Early life ==
Frankland was the eldest son of Sir Thomas Frankland, 2nd Baronet and Elizabeth Russell (through whom he was a descendant of Oliver Cromwell). He was admitted at Jesus College, Cambridge in 1700. Between 1704 and 1705 he travelled abroad in Italy and studied at Padua University in 1705. He was elected a Fellow of the Royal Society in March, 1707.

== Political career ==
Frankland was elected Member of Parliament for Harwich at the 1708 general election and was returned unopposed in 1710. He was a member of the Hanover Club. He was returned unopposed as MP for the family borough of Thirsk at the 1713 and 1715 general elections. In 1715 he was appointed to the post of Clerk of the Deliveries of the Ordnance which he held until 1722. He was returned unopposed for Thirsk at the 1722 general election and was appointed to the post of Commissioner of Revenue (Ireland) in 1724. He succeeded to the baronetcy on the death of his father on 30 October 1726. Returned again for Thirsk in 1727 he changed post to become a Member of the Board of Trade in 1728. In 1730 he became instead one of the Lords of the Admiralty. He was returned unopposed again at Thirsk at the 1734 and 1741 general elections.

== Family and legacy ==
Frankland died on 17 April 1747. He had married twice. Firstly on 5 June 1715, he married Dinah Topham, daughter of Francis Topham of Agelthorpe, by whom he had two daughters:

- Elizabeth (died 1742), who married John Trevor of Trevallyn and Plasteg
- Dinah, Countess of Lichfield (1719–1779), who married The 3rd Earl of Lichfield

His second wife was Sarah Moseley (died 1783) whom he married on 9 July 1741 She was 40 years his junior and was left all his property in his will. The will was contested and rejected as being made "while he was under undue influence and while of unsound mind". An earlier will left her the property only for life.

As he had no son, the baronetcy passed to his nephew, Charles, son of his brother Henry Frankland, Governor of Bengal.

Parliament of Great Britain
Preceded by Sir Thomas Davall; John Ellis	Member of Parliament for Harwich; 1708–1713; With: Sir John Leake 1708; Kenrick Edisbury 1708–1713	Succeeded by Sir Thomas Davall; Carew Harvey Mildmay
Preceded by Ralph Bell; Thomas Worsley	Member of Parliament for Thirsk; 1713–1747; With: Ralph Bell 1713–1717; Thomas Pitt 1717–1722; Sir William St Quintin 1722–1727; Thomas Robinson 1727–1734; Frederick Meinhardt Frankland 1734–1747	Succeeded by Frederick Meinhardt Frankland; Thomas Frankland
Political offices
Preceded by James Craggs	Clerk of the Deliveries of the Ordnance; 1715–1722	Succeeded by Leonard Smelt
Baronetage of England
Preceded by Thomas Frankland	Baronet (of Thirkelby); 1726–1747	Succeeded by Charles Frankland
