= John Frankland =

British religious leader

The Very Revd John Frankland (1669 – 1730) was an 18th-century academic and Dean in the Church of England.

The youngest son of Sir William Frankland, 1st Baronet, he was born at Thirkleby and educated at Eton College. He graduated B.A. from Sidney Sussex College, Cambridge in 1695, and M.A. in 1698. He was elected a Fellow of Sidney Sussex College, Cambridge in 1700; and ordained a priest of the Church of England in 1702. He held livings in Oswaldkirk and Bristol.

Frankland was Dean of Gloucester from 1723 until 1729, and then Dean of Ely until his death on 3 September 1730, he was also elected Master of Sidney Sussex in 1726, and then Vice Chancellor of the University of Cambridge for 1728–29.

Dr Frankland married Mary Turton, leaving an only son the Revd John Frankland, also a clergyman.

== See also ==
- Frankland baronets
