= Gregory Page-Turner =

British politician (1748–1805)

Sir Gregory Page-Turner 3rd Baronet
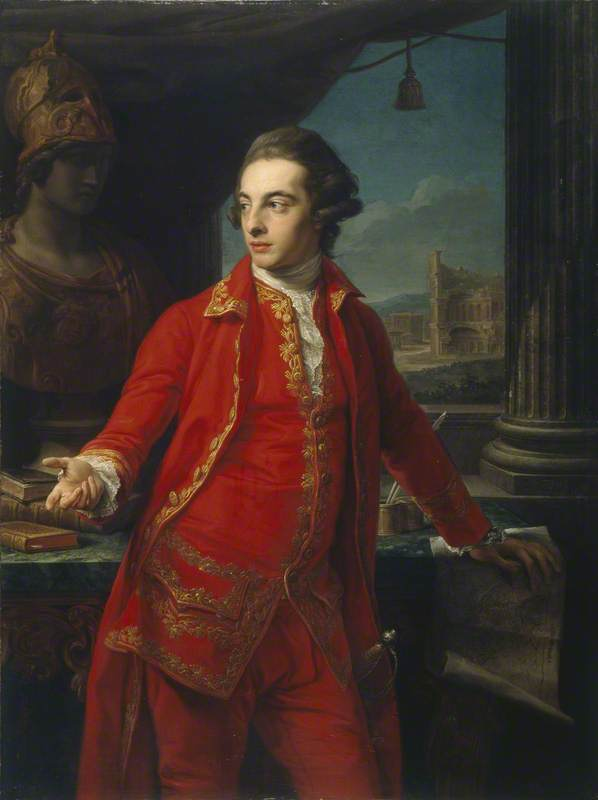
- Portrait of Sir Gregory Page-Turner by Pompeo Batoni, 1768

MP for Thirsk
- In office 1787–1805
- Monarch: George III

Personal details
- Born: 16 February 1748
- Died: 4 January 1805 (aged 56)

Sir Gregory Page-Turner, 3rd Baronet (16 February 1748 – 4 January 1805) was a wealthy landowner and politician in late 18th century England, serving as Member of Parliament (MP) for Thirsk for 21 years.

Gregory Turner ("Page" was added later) was the eldest son of Sir Edward Turner, 2nd Baronet of Ambrosden near Bicester in Oxfordshire. Gregory succeeded him to become the third Turner baronet on 31 October 1766.

Pompeo Batoni painted Sir Gregory's portrait in about 1768. In 1771, Sir Gregory sold the manor of Wendlebury, Oxfordshire, which his father had bought in 1764, to his father's steward John Pardoe.

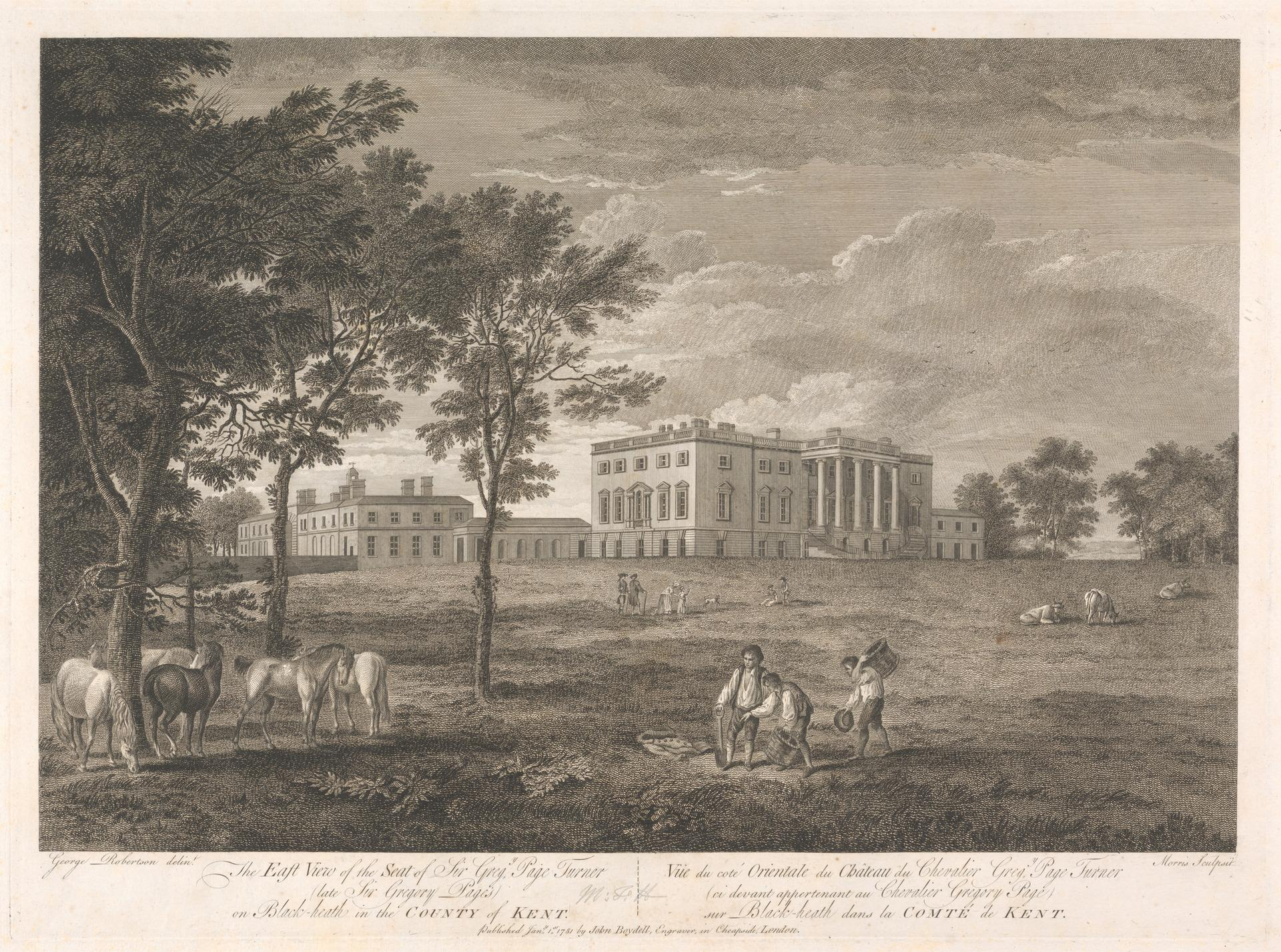
Wricklemarsh Manor, Blackheath

In 1775 he inherited substantial estates in northwest Kent (today part of southeast London) from his great-uncle Sir Gregory Page, and added "Page" to his surname. These included a mansion and 283 acres (115 ha) of estates at Wricklemarsh (today part of Blackheath), which were sold in 1783 for £22,000 to John Cator. That year he served as High Sheriff of Oxfordshire and then as MP for Thirsk from April 1784 until his death in 1805.

Page-Turner was a noted book collector. An internet meme has arisen about this, comparing his surname with the popular idiom used for an exciting novel.

His father Sir Edward Turner, 2nd Baronet had a country house, Ambrosden House, built by the architect Sanderson Miller in the 1740s. Sir Gregory never lived at Ambrosden, thought the house too big and in 1767 sought to demolish part of it to make it smaller. This proved impractical so in 1768 he had the entire house demolished.

He died at the age of 56 and was buried in Bicester. He had married Frances, the daughter of Joseph Howell. Their son Gregory Osborne Page-Turner (1785–1843) succeeded him to become the fourth baronet. Their daughter, Anna Leigh Guy Page-Turner, married Sir Henry Barron, 1st Baronet.

== Sources ==
- Lobel, Mary D, ed. (1957). Victoria County History: A History of the County of Oxford: Volume 5: Bullingdon hundred. pp. 15–30.
- Leigh Rayment's Historical List of MPs

Parliament of Great Britain
Preceded by Sir Thomas Gascoigne; Beilby Thompson	Member of Parliament for Thirsk; 1784–1800; With: Sir Thomas Frankland 1784–1785; Robert Vyner 1785–1796; Sir Thomas Frankland 1796–1801	Succeeded by Parliament of the United Kingdom
Parliament of the United Kingdom
Preceded by Parliament of Great Britain	Member of Parliament for Thirsk; 1801–1805; With: William Frankland	Succeeded by William Frankland; Hon. Richard Neville
Baronetage of England
Preceded by Edward Turner	Baronet (of Ambrosden); 1766–1805	Succeeded by Gregory Osborne Page-Turner
