= William Cholmeley =

English politician

William Cholmeley MP
- Born: Burton Coggles, Lincolnshire, England
- Education: Magdalene College, Cambridge
- Occupation: politician
- Years active: 1624–1626
- Known for: Member of Parliament
- Father: Sir Henry Cholmeley

William Cholmeley was an English politician who sat in the House of Commons from 1624 to 1626.

Cholmeley was the son of Sir Henry Cholmeley, of Burton Coggles, Lincolnshire. He matriculated from Magdalene College, Cambridge in Autumn 1612 and was admitted at Gray's Inn on 12 August 1614. In 1624, he was elected Member of Parliament for Great Bedwyn for the Happy Parliament, and was re-elected MP for Great Bedwyn in 1625. He was elected MP for Thirsk in 1626. He became an Ancient of Gray's Inn in 1638.

Parliament of England
| Preceded by Sir Francis Popham; Sir Giles Mompesson | Member of Parliament for Great Bedwyn; 1624–1625; With: Hugh Crompton; Sir John Brooke | Succeeded by John Selden; Sir Maurice Berkeley |
| Preceded by Henry Belasyse; Henry Stanley | Member of Parliament for Thirsk; 1626; With: Henry Belasyse | Succeeded by Christopher Wandesford; William Frankland |
