= Thirkleby Hall =

Country house in Great Thirkleby, North Yorkshire, England

Coordinates: 54.20646°N 1.28101°W

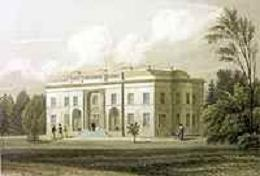
Thirkleby Hall circa 1800

Thirkleby Hall was a large 18th-century country house in Great Thirkleby in the Hambleton Hills of North Yorkshire. It was demolished in 1927.

== History ==
The manor of Thirkleby was acquired in 1576 by William Frankland, a wealthy London merchant. It passed down in the Frankland family to William Frankland, who was made a baronet in 1660. It afterwards descended through the Frankland Baronets to Sir Thomas Frankland, 5th Baronet in 1783 (after the death of the 4th Baronet's second wife), who was an Admiral of the White in the Royal Navy and MP for Thirsk, but who died the following year.

His son Sir Thomas Frankland, 6th Baronet commissioned James Wyatt to build a new house, stables and triumphal arch in classical style; it was completed in 1790. The 6th Baronet's son, Sir Robert Frankland-Russell, 7th Baronet, had no son and following his death in 1849, the estate passed to his cousin's third daughter who had married Sir William Payne-Gallwey, 2nd Baronet two years earlier. (The baronetcy passed to his cousin Frederick William Frankland.) In 1881 the estate passed to Sir William's son, Sir Ralph Payne-Gallwey. When Ralph's son was killed in the First World War Sir Ralph decided to sell the estate by auction.

The house failed to sell and was demolished in 1927. The entry arch/gatehouse still stands and is in use. The stables building is also still present. A holiday caravan park has been built to the east of it.

== Stables ==
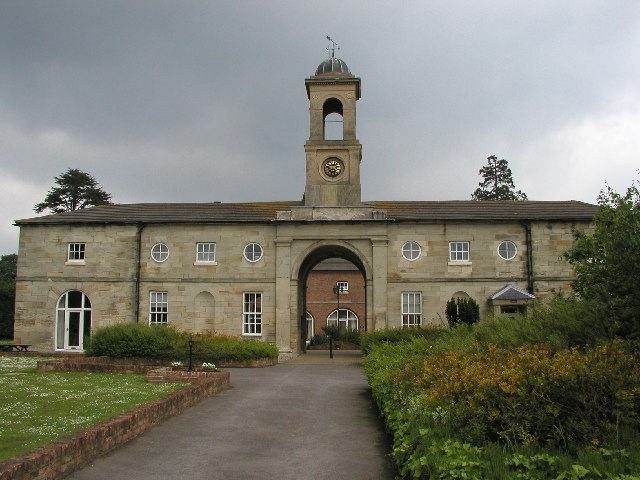
The stables, in 2002

The stable block was designed by Wyatt. It built of stone and pinkish brick with roofs of slate. It has two storeys and a courtyard plan, with ranges of nine and seven bays. In the centre of the entrance range is a full-height round arch with archivolts on imposts, pilasters, and an entablature with a frieze, a cornice and a blocking course. Above it is a rendered square clock tower with two stages. The lower stage has a plinth, pilasters and a cornice with recesses containing a clock face on the front and blind oculi on the sides. The upper stage has open round arches, a lead cupola and an iron weathervane.

== See also ==
- Listed buildings in Thirkleby High and Low with Osgodby

== Sources ==
- Robinson, John, Felling the Ancient Oaks, Aurum Press, 2011, ISBN 978-1845136703
