= Thomas Robinson, 1st Baron Grantham =

British diplomat and politician (1695–1770

The Right Honourable The Lord Grantham KB PC
- c. 1740–1745 portrait

Leader of the House of Commons
- In office 23 March 1754 – October 1755
- Preceded by: Henry Pelham
- Succeeded by: Henry Fox

Secretary of State for the Southern Department
- In office 23 March 1754 – October 1755
- Preceded by: The Earl of Holderness
- Succeeded by: Henry Fox

Personal details
- Born: 1695 Grantham, England
- Died: 30 September 1770 (aged 74/75)
- Cause of death: Stroke
- Party: Whig
- Spouse: Frances Worsley
- Children: 8
- Education: Trinity College, Cambridge

Thomas Robinson, 1st Baron Grantham, KB, PC (c. 1695 – 30 September 1770) was a British diplomat and politician who represented Thirsk and Christchurch in the House of Commons of Great Britain between 1727 and 1761.

== Early life ==
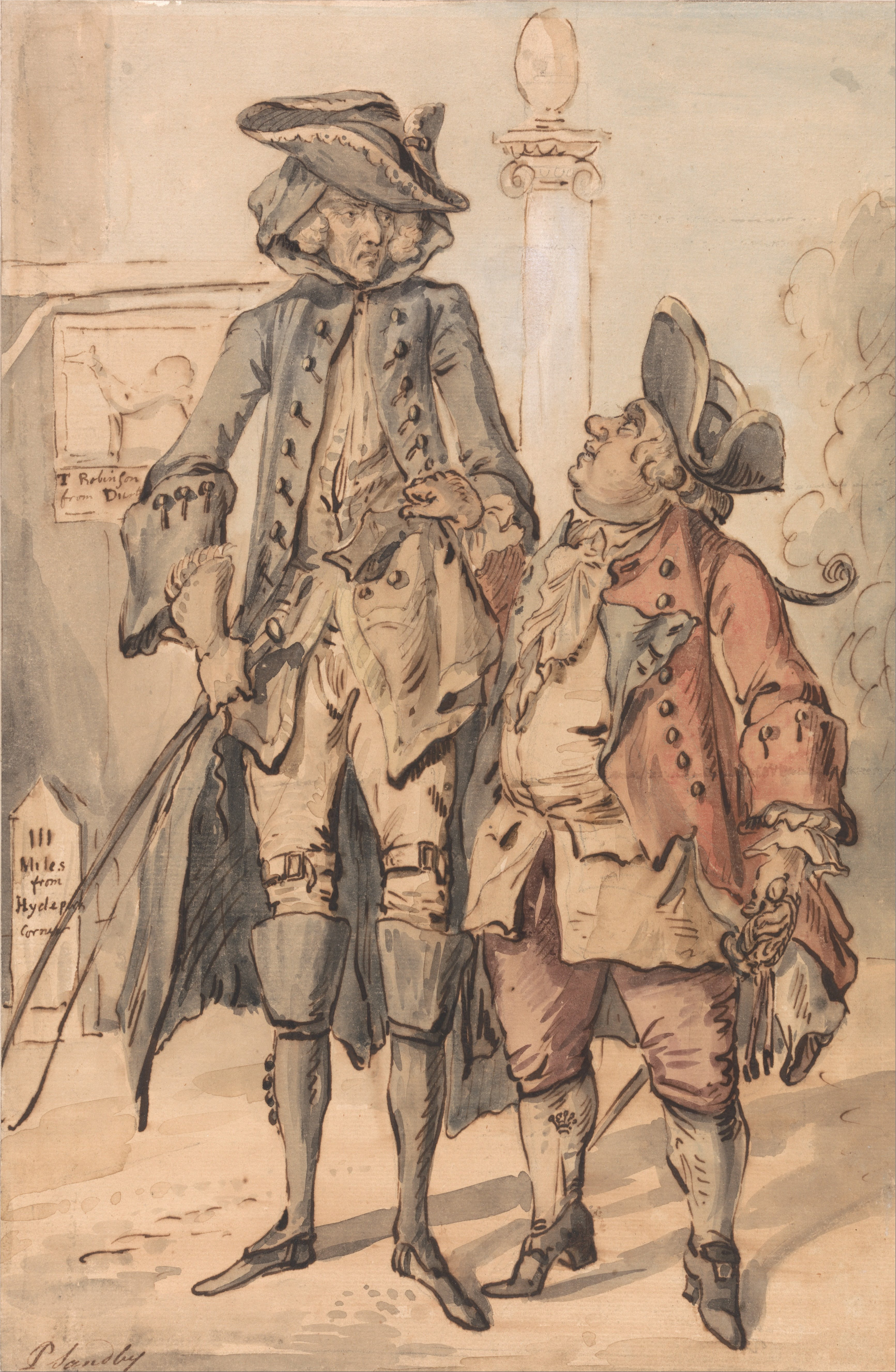
c. 1761 caricature of Robinson (right) and George Bubb Dodington by Paul Sandby

Robinson was a younger son of Sir William Robinson, Bt (1655–1736) of Newby-on-Swale, Yorkshire, who was Member of Parliament for York from 1697 to 1722. His elder brother was Rear Admiral Sir Tancred Robinson.

He was educated at Westminster School and Trinity College, Cambridge, where he matriculated in 1712, gained a scholarship in 1714, and graduated B.A. 1716, M.A. 1719. He gained a fellowship at Trinity in 1718, and was admitted to the Middle Temple in 1723.

== Career ==
Robinson gained his earliest diplomatic experience in Paris. At the 1727 British general election he was returned as Member of Parliament for the pocket borough of Thirsk on the Frankland interest, after his eldest brother, for whom the seat had originally been intended, resigned his pretensions to him. He was absent, presumably on account of his diplomatic duties, from all the recorded divisions of that Parliament. After Paris he went to Vienna, where he was English ambassador from 1730 to 1748. During 1741 he sought to make peace between the empress Maria Theresa and Frederick the Great, but in vain, and in 1748 he represented his country at the Congress of Aix-la-Chapelle. He was made a Knight Companion of the Bath in 1742.

Returning to England Robinson sat in parliament for Christchurch from 1749 to 1761. In 1750, he was appointed to the Privy Council.

== Southern Secretary ==
In 1754 Robinson was appointed Secretary of State for the Southern Department and Leader of the House of Commons by the prime minister, the Duke of Newcastle, and it was on this occasion that Pitt made the famous remark to Fox, "the duke might as well have sent us his jackboot to lead us." In November 1755 he resigned, and in April 1761 he was created Baron Grantham.

== Later career ==
He was Master of the Great Wardrobe 1749–1754 and again 1755–1760, and was joint Postmaster-General in 1765 and 1766. He died in London on 30 September 1770.

He married Frances, daughter of Thomas Worsley of Hovingham, on 13 July 1737, and had two sons and six daughters. He was succeeded in the peerage by his eldest son Thomas.

The town of Grantham, New Hampshire in the United States of America is named after Robinson.

Parliament of Great Britain
| Preceded by Sir Thomas Frankland; William St. Quinton | Member of Parliament for Thirsk; 1727–1734; With: Sir Thomas Frankland | Succeeded by Sir Thomas Frankland; Frederick Meinhardt Frankland |
| Preceded by Edward Hooper; Charles Armand Powlett | Member of Parliament for Christchurch; 1748–1761; With: Charles Armand Powlett 1748–1751; Lord Harry Powlett 1751–1754; Hon. John Mordaunt 1754–1761 | Succeeded by Hon. Thomas Robinson; James Harris |
Diplomatic posts
| Preceded by The Earl Waldegrave | British Ambassador to Austria; 1730–1748 | Succeeded by Robert Keith |
Court offices
| Preceded by The Duke of Montagu | Master of the Great Wardrobe; 1749–1754 | Succeeded by The Viscount Barrington |
| Preceded by The Viscount Barrington | Master of the Great Wardrobe; 1755–1760 | Succeeded by The Earl Gower |
Political offices
| Preceded by The Earl of Holdernesse | Secretary of State for the Southern Department; 1754–1755 | Succeeded by Henry Fox |
| Preceded by Sir Henry Pelham | Leader of the House of Commons; 1754–1755 | Succeeded by Henry Fox |
| Preceded by The Lord Trevor; The Lord Hyde | Postmaster-General; 1765–1766; With: The Earl of Bessborough | Succeeded by Viscount Hillsborough; The Lord le Despencer |
Peerage of Great Britain
| New creation | Baron Grantham; 1761–1770 | Succeeded by Thomas Robinson |
