= William Frankland (died 1640) =

English politician

William Frankland (c. 1573 – 10 December 1640) was an English politician who sat in the House of Commons from 1628 to 1629 and in 1640.

Frankland was the son of Ralph Frankland of Carlton, near Thirsk, and his wife Margaret and educated at Barnard's Inn and Gray's Inn (1596). He inherited the manor of Great Thirkleby from his uncle Hugh Frankland in 1606.

Frankland was appointed High Sheriff of Hertfordshire for 1613–14. Between 1619 and 1623 he sold his properties in Hertfordshire and built a house on the Great Thirkleby estate he had inherited. In 1628 he was elected Member of Parliament for Thirsk and sat until 1629 when King Charles decided to rule without parliament for eleven years. In April 1640, he was re-elected MP for Thirsk in the Short Parliament.

Frankland died in 1640. He had married Lucy Boteler, daughter of Sir Henry Boteler, of Hatfield-Woodhall, Hertfordshire, by whom he had seven sons. He was succeeded by his son Henry, who was the father of Sir William Frankland, 1st Baronet.

Parliament of England
Preceded by Henry Belasyse; William Cholmley	Member of Parliament for Thirsk; 1628–1629; With: Christopher Wandesford	Parliament suspended until 1640
Vacant Parliament suspended since 1629	Member of Parliament for Thirsk; 1640; With: John Belasyse	Succeeded by Sir Thomas Ingram; John Belasyse
