= Osgoodby Hall =

Building in North Yorkshire, England

Coordinates: 54.2215°N 1.2463°W

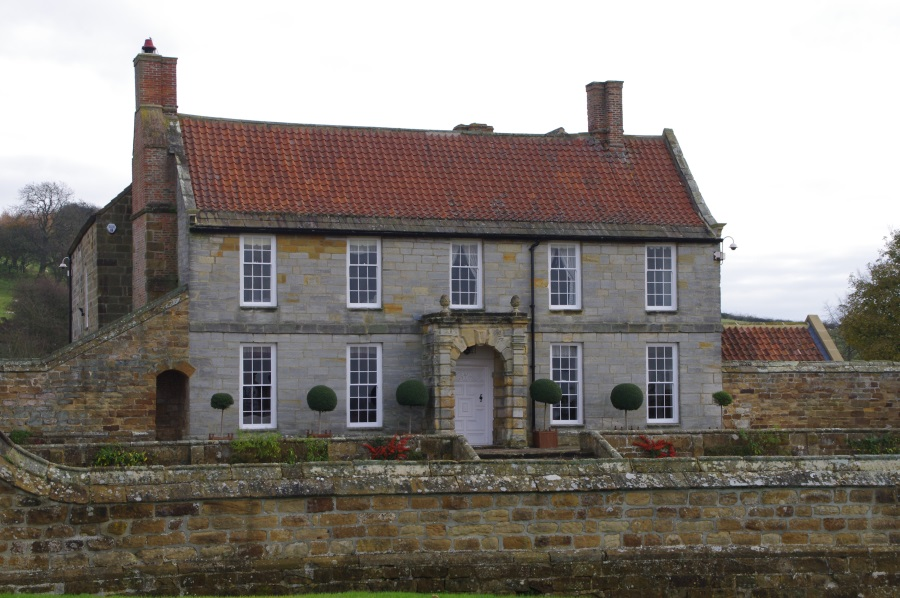
The building, in 2013

Osgoodby Hall is a historic building near the village of Great Thirkleby in North Yorkshire, in England.

The country house was built in the 16th century, as Osgodby Hall. It was largely remodelled in the mid or late 17th century, then altered and extended in the 18th century. In about 1800 it was refaced and again remodelled, and it was restored in the 1970s. The building has been grade II* listed since 1952.

The house is built of gritstone on a plinth, with a floor band, and a pantile roof with stone slate at the eaves, stone coping and shaped kneelers. It has two storeys, five bays, and a parallel rear range with flanking wings. The central porch has a round-arched doorway with a rusticated surround, pilasters, a cornice and blocking course, and acorn finials. Inside, the return walls have rusticated semi-domed niches with a moulded impost band. The windows are sashes, those on the ground floor with keystones. Inside, there is some 17th-century panelling, one early fireplace and others dating from around 1800, and a massive 17th-century oak staircase.

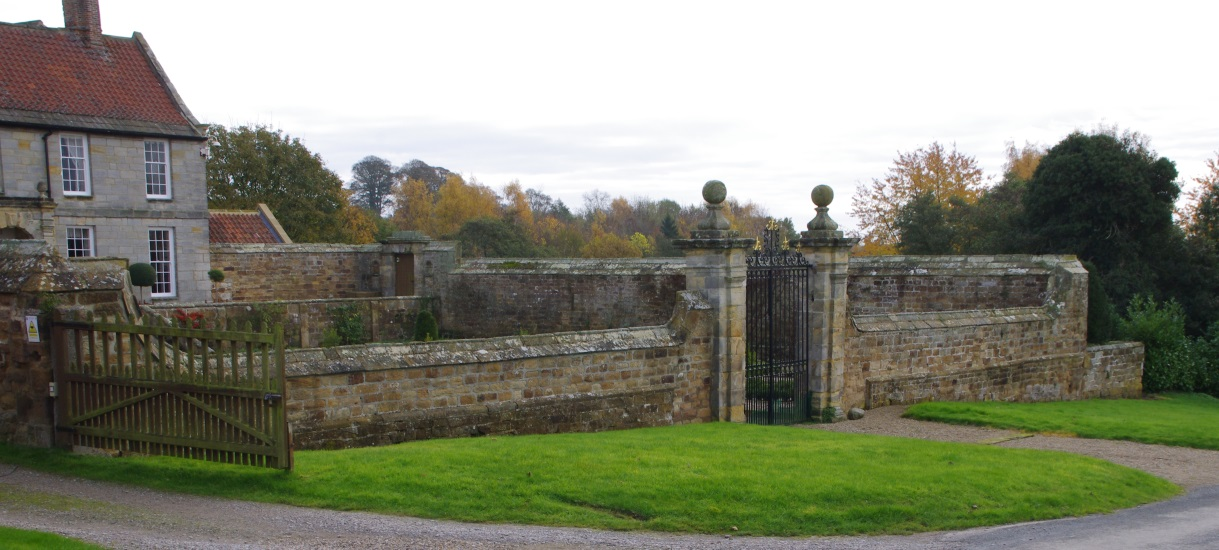
The garden wall

The garden wall was built in the 17th century and is also grade II* listed. It encloses a rectangular garden, is built of stone on a chamfered plinth, and has moulded saddleback coping on the front and rear walls, and triangular coping on the side walls. In each side wall is a flat-arched doorway with imposts, a cornice and a keystone, The main entrance in the centre of the front wall is flanked by square stone piers, each with a moulded plinth and capital, a pilaster on the front, an entablature with a cornice, and a ball on cushion finial, and between them are wrought iron gates.

== See also ==
- Grade II* listed buildings in North Yorkshire (district)
- Listed buildings in Thirkleby High and Low with Osgodby
