= All Saints' Church, Thirkleby =

Church in Great Thirkleby, North Yorkshire, England

Coordinates: 54°12′08″N 1°16′35″W

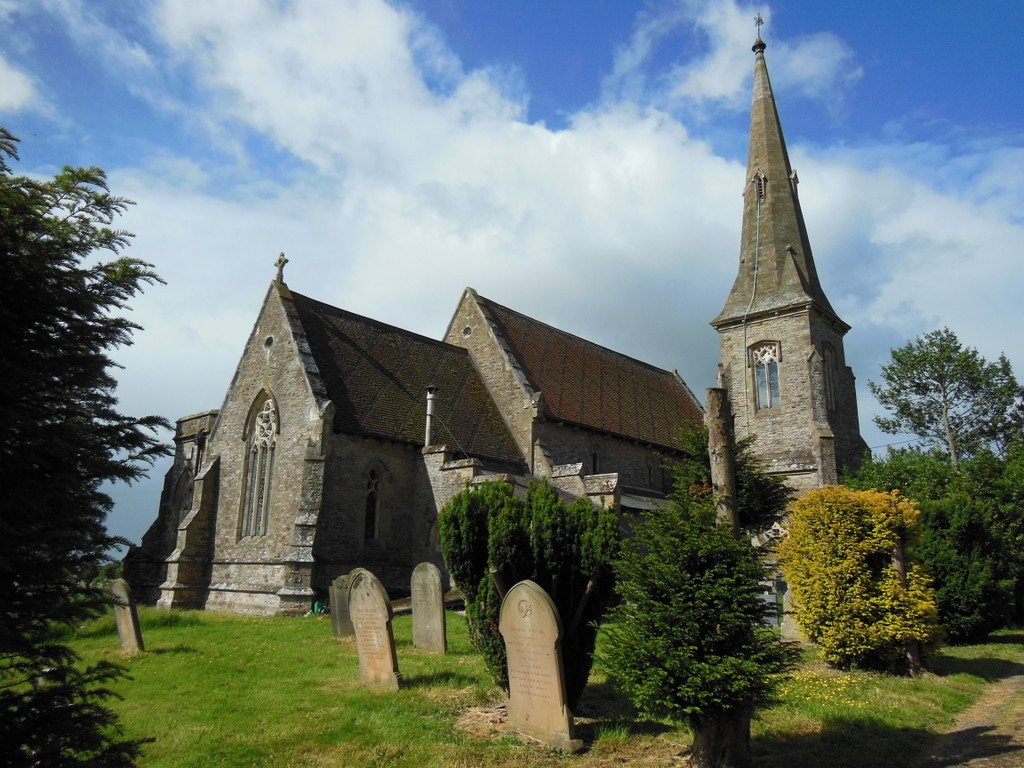
The church, in 2013

All Saints' Church is an Anglican church in Great Thirkleby, a village in North Yorkshire, in England.

A church was built in Thirkleby in or before the 11th century. It was demolished and a new church was built in 1722. In 1852, that building was demolished, and a new church was constructed, to a 14th-century neo-Gothic design by Edward Buckton Lamb. It was commissioned by Louisa Frankland-Russell, in memory of her husband. The building was grade II* listed in 1988. Its distinctive features include an octagonal chapel with a vault below.

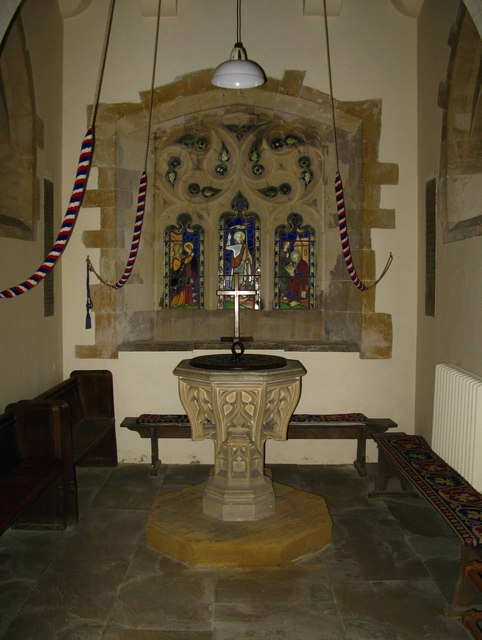
The font

The church is built of stone, the aisles roofed in Welsh slate and the rest of the church in tile. It consists of a nave with a clerestory, north and south aisles, a chancel with a southeast chapel and a north vestry, and a northwest porch and steeple. The steeple has a tower with two stages, an octagonal stair turret with a conical roof, circular windows on the east and west fronts, and a three-light window on the north, two-light bell openings, a moulded band with ball flowers, and a broach spire, with finials on the broaches, lucarnes, a scalloped capstone, and an iron finial. Inside, the hammerbeam roofs are visible, while the chapel has a ribbed vault with elaborate bosses. The original font, chapel screen, altar rail and Minton floor tiles survive. There are several memorials to members of the Frankland family, the earliest dating from the 17th century.

== See also ==
- Grade II* listed churches in North Yorkshire (district)
- Listed buildings in Thirkleby High and Low with Osgodby
