= Robert Vyner (1717–1799) =

British politician

Robert Vyner (1717–1799), was a British politician who sat in the House of Commons at various times between 1754 and 1796.

== Early life ==
Vyner was the only son of Robert Vyner of Gautby and his wife Margaret Style, daughter of Sir Thomas Style, 2nd Baronet, and was born on 27 June 1717. He was educated by private tutor at home and was admitted at St John's College, Cambridge on 3 April 1738 and at Inner Temple on 18 November 1741.

== Political career ==
Vyner was returned unopposed as Member of Parliament for Okehampton as the Duke of Bedford's candidate in the 1754 general election. He did not stand in 1762 and was defeated at Lincoln in the 1768 general election. He married Eleanor Anderson, daughter of Thomas Carter of Redbourne, Lincolnshire, and widow of Francis Anderson on 5 May 1768. She was the mother of Charles Anderson-Pelham and Francis Evelyn Anderson who both joined him in Parliament.

In 1774 Vyner was elected MP for Lincoln after a contest. He retained his seat at Lincoln at the 1780 general election. The English Chronicle wrote about him in 1781 as follows. “He enjoys an estate of eight or ten thousand a year in Lincolnshire, is generally esteemed proud and imperious to inferiors, notwithstanding the apparent softness of his interior contexture in the House, and is not at all popular even in the place he represents.”

Vyner did not seek re-election at Lincoln in 1784 but instead was returned as MP for Thirsk on the Frankland interest at by-election in 1785. He held the seat in the 1790 general election but did not seek re-election in 1796. He was passed over for a peerage. Nathaniel Wraxall described him as "endowed with very good common sense, and of an unimpeachable character".

== Later life and legacy ==
Vyner died on 19 July 1799. He had one son Robert who was born in 1762, before he married Eleanor, in addition to his step-children.

Parliament of Great Britain
Preceded by George Lyttelton; Thomas Pitt	Member of Parliament for Okehampton; 1754–1761; With: George Lyttelton 1754-1756; William Pitt (the Elder) 1756; Thomas Potter 1757-1759; Rear Admiral George Brydges Rodney 1759-1761	Succeeded by Alexander Forrester; Wenman Coke
Preceded by Thomas Scrope; Constantine John Phipps	Member of Parliament for Lincoln; 1774–1784; With: The Viscount Lumley 1774-1780; Sir Thomas Clarges, Bt 1780-1783; John Fenton-Cawthorne 1783-1784	Succeeded by John Fenton-Cawthorne; Richard Lumley-Savile
Preceded by Sir Thomas Frankland; Sir Gregory Page-Turner	Member of Parliament for Thirsk; 1785– 1796; With: Sir Gregory Page-Turner	Succeeded by Sir Thomas Frankland, Bt; Sir Gregory Page-Turner
