= John Russell Greenhill =

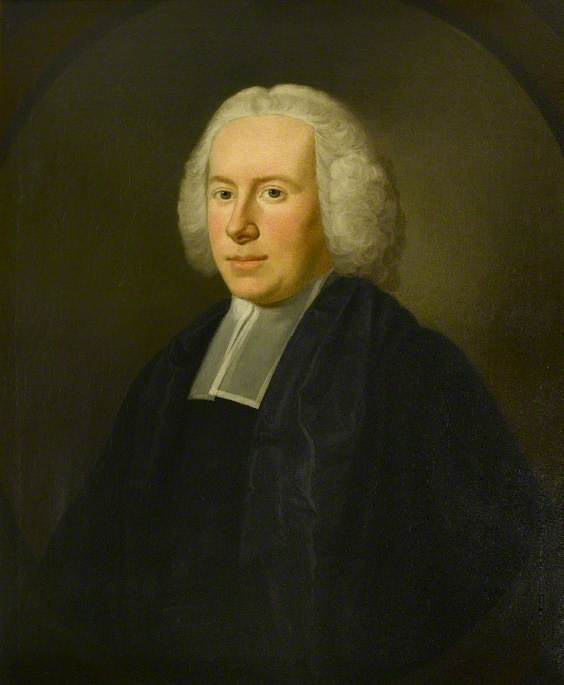
John Russell Greenhill

Rev. John Russell Greenhill (baptised 11 December 1727 – 20 December 1813) was an English cleric, known as the owner of Chequers, Buckinghamshire.

== Life ==
He was the son of Samuel Greenhill (died 1749) of Swyncombe, Oxfordshire of the East India Company and Elizabeth Russell, daughter of John Russell. His mother belonged to the Russell of Chequers Court family and was descended from Oliver Cromwell. He was baptised in Calcutta in December 1727, only three months after his parents' marriage. His mother died a year later.

Greenhill matriculated at Trinity College, Oxford in 1746, graduating B.C.L. in 1754 and D.C.L. in 1759. He was ordained deacon by Thomas Secker in 1754, and priest in 1755. He became rector of Fringford in 1756, with the addition of Marsh Gibbon in 1779, both livings being in Oxfordshire. While Rector of Marsh Gibbon, Greenhill kept a weather diary, from 1780 to 1787. His diary entries include daily temperature and barometer readings, along with notes on wind direction and sundry comments on weather conditions.

On the death of his cousin Mary Russell, Greenhill inherited Chequers. From 1773 until his death he was lord of the manor of Cottisford, also in Oxfordshire.

Greenhill died on 20 December 1813.

== Family ==
On 5 June 1758, Greenhill married Elizabeth Noble, daughter of Matthew Noble of Sunderland, at St Andrew, Holborn. Sir Robert Greenhill-Russell, 1st Baronet Greenhill-Russell of Chequers Court, was their son. He inherited both Chequers and Cottisford.

== Sources ==
- Lobel, Mary (1959). Victoria County History: A History of the County of Oxford: Volume 6. London, Archibald Constable. Published for University of London Institute of Historical Research by Oxford University Press. pp. 103–116.
