= Listed buildings in Thirkleby High and Low with Osgodby =

Thirkleby High and Low with Osgodby is a civil parish in the county of North Yorkshire, England. It contains 20 listed buildings that are recorded in the National Heritage List for England. Of these, three are listed at Grade II*, the middle of the three grades, and the others are at Grade II, the lowest grade. The parish contains the villages of Great Thirkleby and Little Thirkleby, the hamlet of Osgodby, and the surrounding countryside. Most of the listed buildings are houses and associated structures, farmhouses and farm buildings, and the others consist of a milepost and a church.

== Key ==
| Grade | Criteria |
|---|---|
| II* | Particularly important buildings of more than special interest |
| II | Buildings of national importance and special interest |

== Buildings ==
| Name and location | Photograph | Date | Notes | Grade |
|---|---|---|---|---|
| Old Orchards; 54.20015°N 1.26856°W | — | Early 16th century (probable) | The house has a timber framed core, it was enclosed in mottled pink brick in the 18th century, and has dentilled eaves and a tile roof. There is a single storey and an attic, four bays and a rear aisle, and rear right wing. On the front is a doorway, a horizontally sliding sash window and casement windows, all with cambered brick arches. On the roof are three flat-roofed dormers. Inside, there is exposed timber framing, and an inglenook fireplace. | II |
| Osgoodby Hall; 54.22151°N 1.24639°W | | 16th century | The house, which has been much altered, is in gritstone on a plinth, with a floor band, and a pantile roof with stone slate at the eaves, stone coping and shaped kneelers. There are two storeys, five bays, and a parallel rear range with flanking wings. The central porch has a round-arched doorway with a rusticated surround, pilasters, a cornice and blocking course, and acorn finials. Inside, the return walls have rusticated semi-domed niches with a moulded impost band. The windows are sashes, those on the ground floor with keystones. | II* |
| Outbuilding east of Low Osgodby Grange; 54.21514°N 1.25660°W | — | 17th century | The outbuilding is in stone, with quoins, an eaves band, and a pantile roof with a stone kneeler and coping to the right gable. There is a single storey and a loft, and three bays. It contains stable doors and windows, one a blocked mullioned window. | II |
| Garden wall and gate piers, Osgoodby Hall; 54.22158°N 1.24686°W | | Mid to late 17th century | The wall encloses a rectangular garden, it is in stone on a chamfered plinth, and has moulded saddleback coping on the front and rear walls, and triangular coping on the side walls. In each side wall is a flat-arched doorway with imposts, a cornice and a keystone, The main entrance in the centre of the front wall is flanked by square stone piers, each with a moulded plinth and capital, a pilaster on the front, an entablature with a cornice, and a ball on cushion finial, and between them are wrought iron gates. | II* |
| Bell Cottage; 54.22162°N 1.24595°W | — | c. 1700 | The former outbuilding is in stone, with quoins, an eaves band, and a corrugated iron roof with stone coping and moulded kneelers. There are two storeys and four bays. On the front is a stable door and a doorway with a lintel and a keystone, and an inserted window. The left gable end has a chamfered plinth, and a door and a hatch, both with lintels and keystones. | II |
| Granary annexe, Hood House; 54.22175°N 1.245959°W | — | c. 1700 | The building is in stone and pinkish brick, with quoins, an eaves band, and a pantile roof with stone slates at the eaves, moulded kneelers and stone coping. There are two storeys and four bays. On the left, steps lead up to a granary door that has a four-pane fanlight, and a lintel with a keystone. At the rear is an upper floor window with a lintel and keystone, and on the left gable is a segmental-arched window. | II |
| High Osgodby Grange; 54.21605°N 1.24450°W | | Early to mid-18th century | A farmhouse with an outbuilding, it is in stone, and has an M-shaped Welsh slate roof with stone coping and moulded kneelers. There are two storeys and attics, and five bays, on the left at the rear is a parallel range, and a single-story rear wing. The garden front has a plinth, a central doorway with a three-pane fanlight, and casement windows with keystones. | II |
| Front garden wall, High Osgodby Grange; 54.21582°N 1.24440°W | — | Early to mid-18th century | The wall is in stone with segmental stone coping, and is about 1 metre (3 ft 3 in) in height. It contains a gateway, part of it has a chamfered plinth, and on the garden front are three round-arched semi-domed niches with archivolts and keystones. | II |
| Low Osgodby Grange; 54.21516°N 1.25681°W | — | Early to mid-18th century | The farmhouse is in red brick, rendered at the rear, on a chamfered stone plinth, with stepped dentilled eaves, and a two-span tile roof with raised verges, stone coping, and shaped kneelers. There are two storeys and attics, and three bays. The central doorway has a fanlight, the windows are sashes, and all the openings have flat brick arches and keystones. | II |
| Thirkleby Barugh; 54.18777°N 1.27070°W | — | Mid 18th century | The farmhouse is in brownish brick, with some stone, a floor band, an eaves band, and a pantile roof. There are two storeys, five bays, and a rear wing. Most of the windows are sashes, and at the rear is a round-arched stair window. | II |
| Stockhill Green Farmhouse; 54.20167°N 1.29086°W | — | Mid to late 18th century | The farmhouse is in dark red brick, with a floor band, stepped and dentilled eaves and a pantile roof. There are two storeys and four bays. The doorway has pilasters, a cornice and a bracketed hood, and to its right is a bow window. Above the doorway is a blind square recess, and the windows date from the 20th century. | II |
| Stable and granary, Stockhill Green Farmhouse; 54.20154°N 1.29099°W | — | Mid to late 18th century | The building is in dark red brick with stepped eaves and a pantile roof. There are two storeys and two bays. The ground floor contains a stable door and two round archways, and on the upper floor are square openings. On the left return, external steps lead up to a granary door, and on the right return is a trough chute. | II |
| Arden Bridge; 54.19834°N 1.27258°W | — | Late 18th century | The bridge carries Back Lane over Thirkleby Beck, and it was almost certainly designed by John Carr. It is in stone, and consists of a single segmental arch flanked by pilaster buttresses. The bridge has a band, and a parapet with chamfered coping. | II |
| St Marys Cottage; 54.20355°N 1.27231°W | — | Late 18th century | The house is in red brick on a plinth, with an eaves band, and a pantile roof with stone coping and shaped kneelers. There are two storeys and two bays. Steps lead up to the central doorway in a trellis porch, and the windows are sashes with flat brick arches, those in the upper floor horizontally sliding. | II |
| Stables, Thirkleby Hall; 54.20657°N 1.28070°W | | 1780s | The stable block of Thirkleby Hall, now demolished, was designed by James Wyatt. It is in stone and pinkish brick with roofs of slate. There are two storeys and a courtyard plan, with ranges of nine and seven bays. In the centre of the entrance range is a full-height round arch with archivolts on imposts, pilasters, and an entablature with a frieze, a cornice and a blocking course. Above it is a rendered square clock tower with two stages. The lower stage has a plinth, pilasters and a cornice with recesses containing a clock face on the front and blind oculi on the sides. The upper stage has open round arches, a lead cupola and an iron weathervane. | II |
| Outbuilding south of Quarry Hill Farmhouse; 54.18733°N 1.26524°W | — | Early 19th century | The outbuilding is in stone, with brick at the rear, on a partial plinth, with a hipped Welsh slate roof. There is one storey and five bays. On the front are five round-headed recesses with casement windows at the tops, and a slate impost band, the left recess with an inserted door. | II |
| Milepost; 54.19381°N 1.28026°W | — | Early to mid-19th century | The milepost on the west side of the A19 road is in cast iron. It has a triangular section, a hollow back and a sloping top. On the top is the distance to London, on the left side is the distance to Easingwold, and on the right side to Thirsk. | II |
| All Saints' Church; 54.20219°N 1.27633°W | | 1851 | The church, designed by E.B. Lamb, is in stone, the aisles roofed in Welsh slate and the rest of the church in tile. It consists of a nave with a clerestory, north and south aisles, a chancel with a southeast chapel and a north vestry, and a northwest porch and steeple. The steeple has a tower with two stages, an octagonal stair turret with a conical roof, circular windows on the east and west fronts, and a three-light window on the north, two-light bell openings, a moulded band with ball flowers, and a broach spire, with finials on the broaches, lucarnes, a scalloped capstone, and an iron finial. | II* |
| Old Rectory; 54.20750°N 1.27131°W | — | 1866 | The rectory, later a private house, is in orange-red brick on a chamfered plinth, with stone dressings, a sill band, cogged eaves, and a grey slate roof, hipped on the left, with gables, crested ridge tiles, and a finial at the left end. There are two storeys and four irregular bays. The doorway has a shouldered arch, and to its right is a semi-octagonal bay window. The windows are mullioned and transomed. | II |
| Outbuilding north of Old Rectory; 54.20766°N 1.27138°W | — | 1866 (probable) | The outbuilding is in mottled pink brick on a chamfered plinth, with stepped eaves and a Welsh slate roof. There is one storey and a loft, and two bays. It contains various openings, and on the left return is a projecting pantiled canopy on timber piers. | II |
