= Giles Mompesson =

English politician

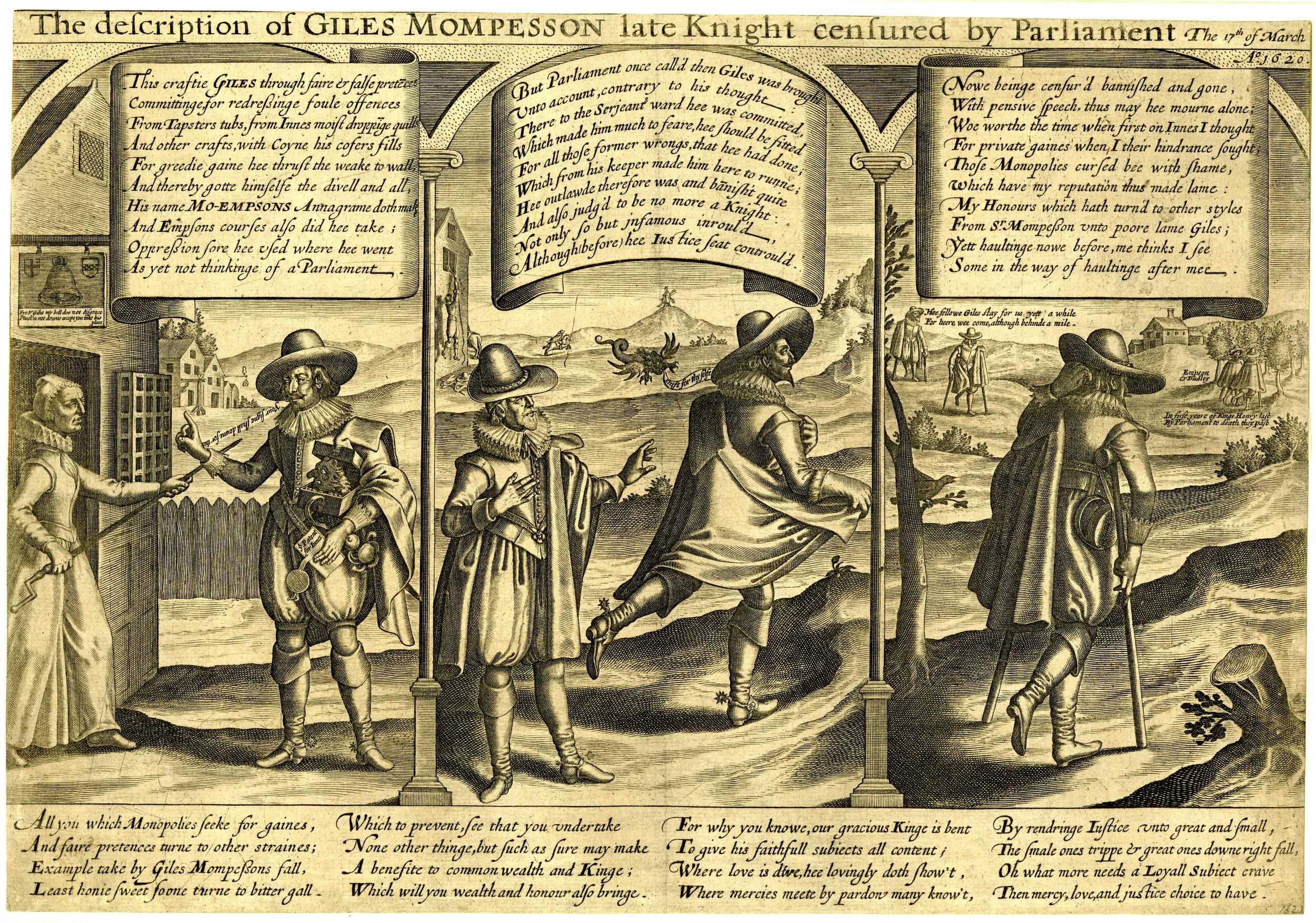
The description of Giles Mompesson (anonymous, 1621) celebrates the downfall of the hated figure.

Giles Mompesson (c. 1583 – c. 1663) was an English office holder and courtier who sat in the House of Commons between 1614 and 1621, when he was sentenced for corruption. He was officially a "notorious criminal" whose career was based on speculation and corruption. His name came to be regarded as a synonym for official corruption, because he used nepotism to gain positions for licensing businesses by which he pocketed the fees. In the reaction against Charles I, Mompesson's name was invoked as a symbol of all that was wrong with aristocracy. Sir Giles Overreach, the anti-hero of Philip Massinger's 1625 play A New Way to Pay Old Debts, is based on Mompesson.

== Licensing monopoly ==
Mompesson was born in Wiltshire. He grew up into a small, swarthy individual with black hair. He entered Hart Hall, Oxford in 1600, but left without a degree the next year for Lincoln's Inn; he later departed there without becoming a lawyer. In 1606 or 1607, he married Katherine, the daughter of the late Sir John St. John, who had been one of the most prominent men in Wiltshire. Through the influence of his brother-in-law, Sir John St John, 1st Baronet, Mompesson became a Member of Parliament for Great Bedwyn in Wiltshire in 1614. Another daughter of John St. John (and thus Mompesson's sister-in-law) married Edward Villiers, the half-brother of George Villiers, and Mompesson's connection to George Villiers was the key to his later despotism. George Villiers became James I's favourite (and alleged lover), rising to the rank of Duke of Buckingham by 1616, and Mompesson was quick to use his family connections. His infamous career was tied directly to that of George Villiers and James I.

In 1616, Mompesson used his influence to propose to Villiers that there be a commissioner of inns. Justices of the peace were in charge of granting licences to taverns, but there was ambiguity about inns. While Fulke Greville, the Chancellor of the Exchequer, disapproved of the legal standing of Mompesson's plan, Sir Francis Bacon, then the Attorney General, felt that it was within the king's powers, and Villiers urged the king to press the exchequer to approve the plan. Mompesson thus became one of three commissioners of inns in 1617. The fines that he could levy against inn-keepers out of compliance were left to his discretion, and the fees that he could charge to license an inn were similarly up to his own judgement. His only constraint was that four-fifths of the money was to go to the Treasury. On 18 November 1616, James knighted Mompesson, giving him more authority when dealing with innkeepers.

Mompesson's performance of his job was aggressive and avaricious. He expanded his brief to license taverns, which was clearly the historical realm of the justices of the peace, and he trespassed into the jurisdiction of the Justices in other ways as well. The justices were responsible for keeping the domestic peace, and Mompesson would allow taverns closed for ill repute and bad behaviour to reopen if they paid him a stiff bribe/fee.

In 1617, Mompesson proposed to Villiers a scheme to raise £10,000 in four years by selling decayed timber from royal estates. For performing this public service, he was to receive £1,000 personally in the first year, with another £1,000 due at the end of four years. Evidence would later show that he made over £10,000 profit beyond what he gave to the Treasury, as well as the £2,000 due to him. By the next year, his reputation was such that there was a backlash. Mompesson was given a second monopoly, to investigate the production of gold and silver thread and to charge licensing fees to those who produced it. Furthermore, he was given the power to imprison those found guilty of producing gold and silver thread without a licence. He immediately set about extorting money from goldsmiths in London. In 1619, Mompesson obtained a position as a surveyor of the profits of James I's New River Company, with a £200 annuity taken from the royal profits. In 1620, he was granted a licence to make charcoal from coal and, finally, a licence to find and recover "concealed" Crown lands (i.e., property over which the Crown's rights as landlord had fallen into abeyance or had not yet fully been realised). Any lands he discovered valued at less than £200 were his to keep, and those above were to be regulated, with fees, rents, and charges for ingress and egress. Naturally, Mompesson undervalued the lands he "found", consistently discovering them to be under the £200 threshold, and farmers were at high risk.

== Backlash, trial, and banishment ==
The sentiment against Mompesson was very high in 1620, and Bacon warned Villiers to take away Mompesson's licensing of inns, in particular. Buckingham, however, continued to support him. Mompesson was re-elected MP for Great Bedwyn in 1621. In February 1621, the House of Commons and House of Lords began investigating him on separate matters, with Commons investigating the inn licensures and Lords the gold thread. Among other damning evidence, there was one account of one of Mompesson's agents showing up at a tavern, claiming emergency, begging for a place to sleep, and then, the next morning, prosecuting the tavern keeper for running an unlicensed inn. Sir Edward Coke found that Mompesson had prosecuted over 3,320 inns and taverns on regulations dating back to Henry VIII. Lords found that Mompesson had been guilty of extortion.

Mompesson's response was to admit his guilt and plead for mercy. He then attempted to blame Bacon for finding the inn scheme legal in the first place. Commons preferred charges to Lords, waiting sentencing, and Mompesson was ordered to attend every day and to be guarded by the Sergeant-at-Arms. On 3 March 1621, Mompesson fled to France. A Royal Proclamation was issued demanding his apprehension. The next week, the sentence came down. Mompesson was ordered to pay a £10,000 fine, lose his knighthood, and ride down the Strand facing backwards from his horse, and then be imprisoned for life. A few days later, they added banishment for life to the penalty. Further, he was decried as an eternally notorious criminal.

His wife, Katherine, stayed in England. She petitioned Charles I for relief, asking that her husband be allowed to return to dispense with his estate, since it was entangled. Commons ordered that all of Mompesson's gains be forfeit, except for the New River annuity, which would go to Katherine. The fine devolved to John St. John. In 1623, Charles gave Mompesson three months to be in England, a period which was later extended. The House of Commons ordered him out of the country on 8 February 1624, but he was back in the country soon after. He lived in Wiltshire in retirement for the rest of his life.

Katherine died in 1633. Mompesson erected a monument to her in St Mary's, the parish church of Lydiard Tregoze, Wiltshire.

== Forest of Dean riots ==
Mompesson was again using his family connections through his sister-in-law Barbara Villiers around 1631, this time employed as her agent managing an area of newly enclosed lands in her possession at the Forest of Dean. Such enclosures and grants of former royal forest were commonly made to courtiers in return for substantial sums of money, as a means to bolster Charles I's finances independent of Parliament.

The lands were worked for iron ore and timber. During riots aimed at destroying the enclosures and returning the lands to common in 1631, an effigy of the "odious projector" Sir Giles was thrown into the iron ore pits and buried as they were filled in by the rioters. Another agent in his employ was shot at and his house burnt.

== Last years ==
During his later years, his name was not forgotten by Parliamentarian forces: he was fined in 1645, in 1649, and as late as 1651. He was a Royalist during the Civil War and visited the king in 1647, though he did not militarily participate. His will was dated 1 September 1651, but was not tested and proved in court until 3 August 1663. Thus, he is thought to have died some time between those dates.

Parliament of England
Preceded by John Rodney; Sir Anthony Hungerford	Member of Parliament for Great Bedwyn; 1614–1622; With: Robert Hyde 1614; Sir Francis Popham 1621–1622	Succeeded by Hugh Crompton; William Cholmeley
