= Robert Flint (MP) =

16th-century English politician

Robert Flint (fl. 1547), was an English politician.

He was a member (MP) of the parliament of England for Thirsk in 1547.
