= Portrait of Sir Gregory Page-Turner =

Painting by Pompeo Batoni

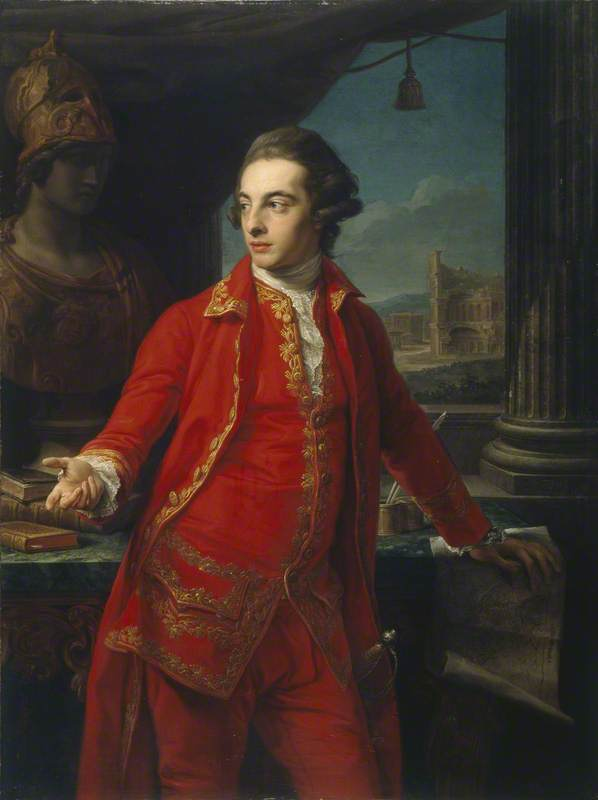
- Artist: Pompeo Batoni
- Year: 1768
- Type: Oil on canvas, portrait painting
- Dimensions: 134.5 cm × 99.5 cm (53.0 in × 39.2 in)
- Location: Manchester Art Gallery, Manchester

Portrait of Sir Gregory Page-Turner is a 1768 portrait painting by the Italian artist Pompeo Batoni. It depicts the English landowner and politician Gregory Page-Turner at the age of twenty. Batoni was a Rome-based artist who became well known for his Grand Manner portraits depicting young British and Irish sitters on the Grand Tour that took in the historic sites of Italy. The composition features several Neoclassical references as Page-Turner is shown in the stance of the Apollo Belvedere, his hand resting on a map of Rome, with a statue of Minerva and a view of the Colosseum in the background.

Page-Turner went on serve as Member of Parliament for Thirsk for two decades. The picture was acquired in 1979 by Manchester Art Gallery.

== Bibliography ==
- Bowron, Edgar Peters & Kerber, Peter Björn. Pompeo Batoni: Prince of Painters in Eighteenth-century Rome. Yale University Press, 2007.
- Redford, Bruce. Venice and the Grand Tour. Yale University Press, 1996.
