= Sir Robert Frankland-Russell, 7th Baronet =

English politician and artist

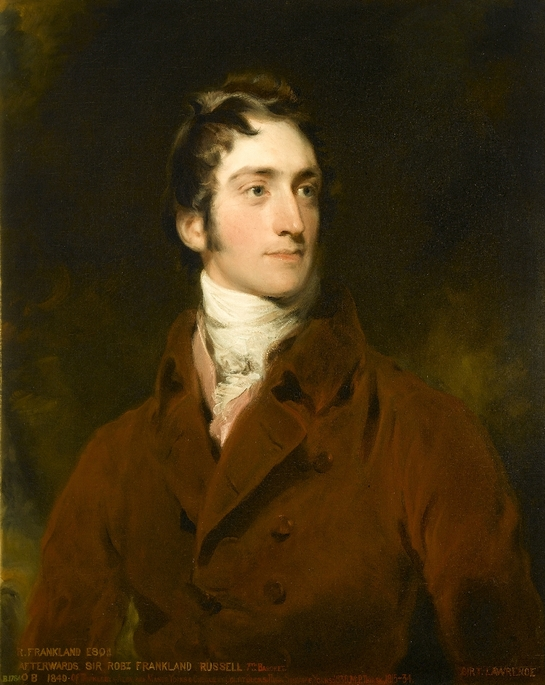
Robert Frankland, portrait by Thomas Lawrence

Sir Robert Frankland-Russell, 7th Baronet (1784–1849) was an English politician, known also as an artist. In early life he was called Robert Frankland.

== Life ==
He was the son of Sir Thomas Frankland, 6th Baronet and his wife Dorothy, daughter of William Smelt. He studied at Christ Church, Oxford.

Frankland was elected to parliament for Thirsk in 1815, resigning his seat in 1834. He succeeded his father as baronet in 1831, and in 1836 inherited property from Sir Robert Greenhill-Russell, 1st Baronet, adding Russell to his surname. The estate included Chequers Court, which he improved, with Edward Buckton Lamb brought in as architect. He was High Sheriff of Yorkshire in 1838.

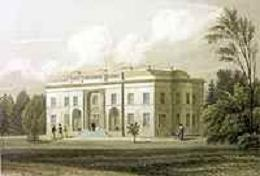
Thirkleby Hall circa 1800

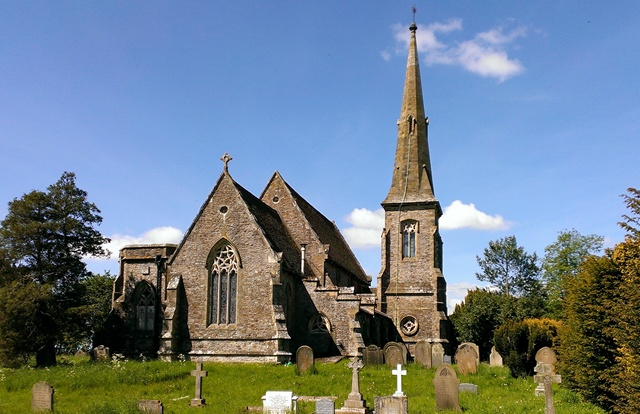
All Saints Church at Thirkleby, built 1852

After her husband's death, Lady Frankland-Russell commissioned his friend Lamb to redesign All Saints parish church at Thirkleby, near the family seat Thirkleby Hall, in his memory.

== Works ==
Frankland-Russell's father had studied under John Malchair, and he himself was a watercolourist, and painted hunting scenes. Two series of aquatints by Charles Turner after Frankland appeared in 1814, Delights of Fishing and Hunting Subjects.

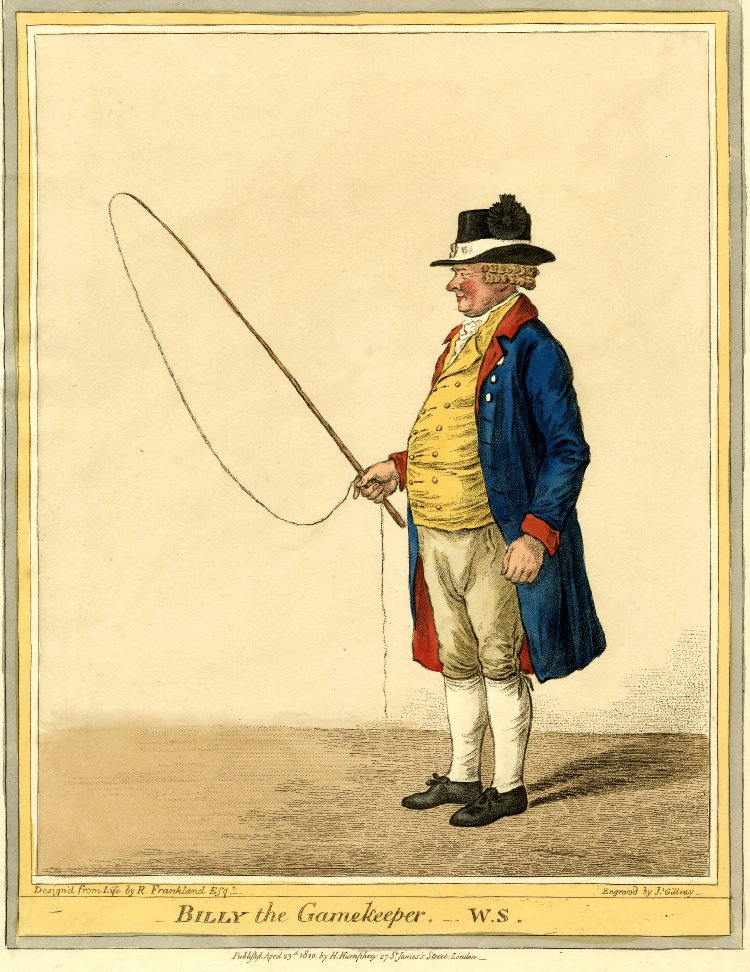
Billy the Gamekeeper, 1810 engraving by James Gillray after Robert Frankland

== Family ==
Frankland married in 1815 Louisa-Anne Murray, third daughter of Lord George Murray. They had five daughters. On the 7th baronet's death, the title passed to his cousin Frederick William Frankland.

The daughters were:

1. Augusta-Louisa, who married Thomas de Grey, 5th Baron Walsingham in 1842, and was mother of Thomas de Grey, 6th Baron Walsingham, dying in 1844
2. Caroline-Agnes (d. 18 May 1846)
3. Emily-Anne, who married Sir William Payne-Gallwey, 2nd Baronet in 1847
4. Julia-Roberta, who married Ralph Neville
5. Rosalind-Alicia, who married Francis L'Estrange Astley, son of Sir Jacob Astley, 5th Baronet, in 1854 as his second wife.

== Notes ==
Parliament of the United Kingdom
| Preceded by Robert Greenhill-Russell; William Frankland | Member of Parliament for Thirsk; 1815–1834; With: Sir Robert Greenhill-Russell 1815–1832 | Succeeded by Samuel Crompton |
Baronetage of England
| Preceded by Thomas Frankland | Baronet (of Thirkleby); 1831–1849 | Succeeded by Frederick Frankland |
