= Frankland baronets =

Title in the Baronetage of England

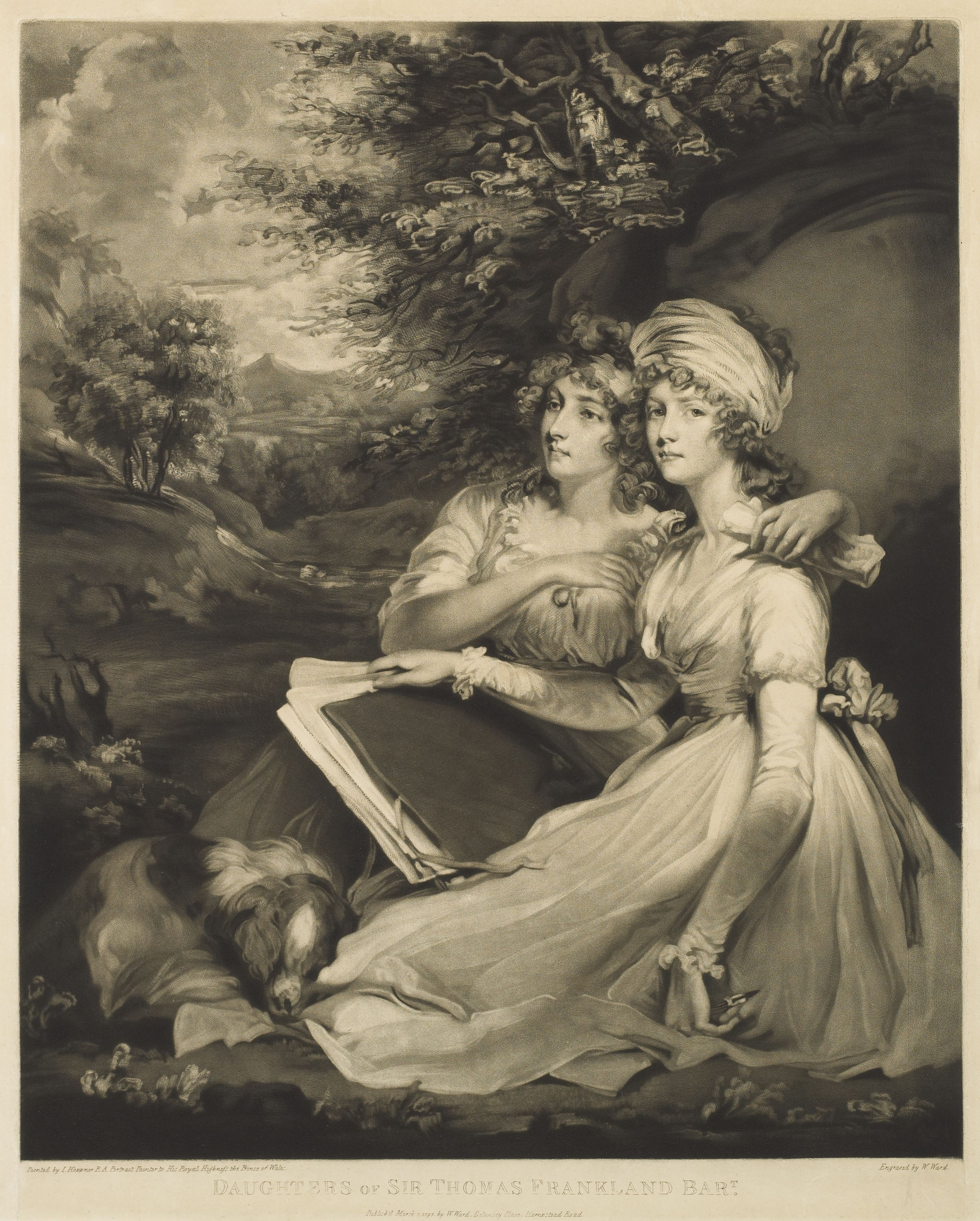
Daughters of Sir Thomas Frankland, Bart., mezzotint published 1797

The Frankland baronetcy, of Thirkelby (or Thirkleby) in the County of York, is a title in the Baronetage of England, created on 24 December 1660 for William Frankland. He later represented Thirsk in Parliament.

His son, the second Baronet, also represented Thirsk as well as Hedon in the House of Commons. In 1683 Frankland married Elizabeth Russell, daughter of Sir John Russell, 3rd Baronet, of Chippenham and his wife Frances Cromwell, daughter of Oliver Cromwell.

His son, the third Baronet, sat as a Member of Parliament for Harwich and Thirsk and served as a Lord of the Admiralty from 1730 to 1741.

He was succeeded by his nephew, the fourth Baronet, who notably served as Consul-General in Lisbon. The fourth Baronet's younger brother, the fifth Baronet, was an Admiral of the White and also represented Thirsk in Parliament for over 30 years.

His son, the sixth Baronet, was a Fellow of the Royal Society and a Member of Parliament for Thirsk. It was the sixth baronet who built Thirkleby Hall. His son, the seventh Baronet, also represented Thirsk in the House of Commons. In 1837 he assumed by Royal licence the surname of Russell after Frankland on inheriting Chequers Court in Buckinghamshire from his kinsman Sir Robert Greenhill-Russell, 1st Baronet, of Chequers Court.

He was succeeded in the Baronetcy but not in the estates by his cousin, the eighth Baronet. He was the son of the youngest son of the fifth Baronet. Frankland notably fought at the Battle of Waterloo in 1815.

His grandson, the tenth Baronet, married as his second wife Mary Cecil Frankland, 16th Baroness Zouche (see the Baron Zouche). He was succeeded by his eldest son, the eleventh Baronet, and on the latter's death in 1944 the title passed to his only son, James, who became the twelfth holder of the Baronetcy. In 1965 James succeeded his grandmother as eighteenth Baron Zouche. Consequently, the Baronetcy is now a subsidiary title of the Barony of Zouche, held by William Thomas Assheton Frankland, 13th Baronet.

== Frankland baronets, of Thirkelby (1660) ==
- Sir William Frankland, 1st Baronet (c. 1640–1697)
- Sir Thomas Frankland, 2nd Baronet (1665–1726)
- Sir Thomas Frankland, 3rd Baronet (c. 1685–1747)
- Sir Charles Henry Frankland, 4th Baronet (c. 1716–1768)
- Sir Thomas Frankland, 5th Baronet (1718–1784)
- Sir Thomas Frankland, 6th Baronet (1750–1831)
- Sir Robert Frankland-Russell, 7th Baronet (1784–1849)
- Sir Frederick William Frankland, 8th Baronet (1793–1878)
- Sir William Adolphus Frankland, 9th Baronet (1837–1883)
- Sir Frederick William Francis George Frankland, 10th Baronet (1868–1937)
- Sir Thomas William Assheton Frankland, 11th Baronet (1902–1944)
- Sir James Assheton Frankland, 12th Baronet (1943–2022)
- Sir William Thomas Assheton Frankland, 13th Baronet (born 1984)

== See also ==
- Baron Zouche
