= Ralph Bell (MP) =

English country gentleman and politician

Ralph Bell (died 3 November 1733) of Thirsk, North Yorkshire was an English country gentleman and politician who was a member of the House of Commons from 1710 to 1717.

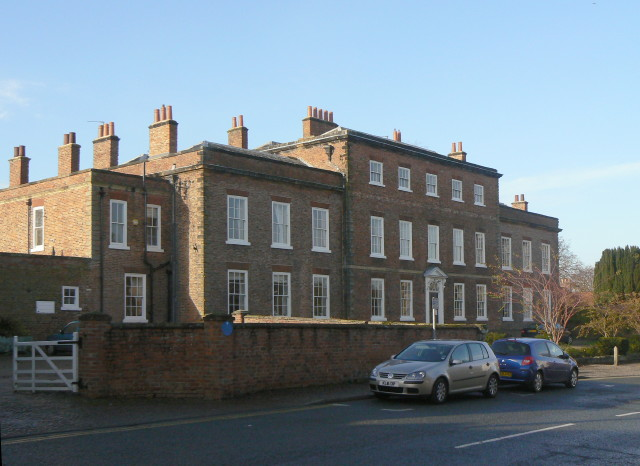
Thirsk Hall

Bell was the son of Robert Bell of Sowerby, North Yorkshire, and his wife Elizabeth. He was a merchant in Thirsk and married Rachel Windlow, daughter of Richard Windlow of Yarm, Yorkshire on 3 March 1697. He succeeded his father in 1711.

The History of Parliament website also provides these specifics: "Bell's family had been settled in Thirsk since the 16th century, and his father, who had a mansion house at Kirkgate, owned 22 of the borough's burgages.

Bell's father and later Bell himself had sufficient electoral interest at Thirsk to control one seat and were politically active before Bell stood himself. He was returned unopposed as Member of Parliament (MP) for Thirsk at the 1710 general election. He was returned again in 1713 and 1715. He resigned his seat in 1717 by accepting a customs post as Customer of Hull.

In 1723, Bell purchased a fine house at Thisk (Thirsk Hall). He died without issue on 3 November 1733. His main heir was a nephew Ralph Consett, who assumed the name of Bell.

Parliament of Great Britain
Preceded by Sir Thomas Frankland, 2nd Bt; Leonard Smelt	Member of Parliament for Thirsk; 1710 – 1717; With: Sir Thomas Frankland, Bt to 1711; Thomas Worsley 1711–13; Thomas Frankland (younger) from 1713	Succeeded by Thomas Frankland (younger); Thomas Pitt
