= Thomas Eynns =

English politician

Thomas Eynns (died 1578), of York and Heslington, Yorkshire, was an English politician.

He was a Member of the Parliament of England for Aldborough in 1571, Cardiganshire in 1542, Heytesbury in 1547, Scarborough in March 1553, Thirsk in October 1553, 1558, 1559, 1563 and Boroughbridge in 1572. In 1568 he built Heslington Hall near York for his use as Secretary and Keeper of the Seal to the Council of the North.
