= Sir William Frankland, 1st Baronet =

English landowner and politician

Sir William Frankland, 1st Baronet (c. 1640 – 2 August 1697) was an English landowner and politician who sat in the House of Commons from 1671 to 1685.

Frankland was the eldest son of Sir Henry Frankland of Thirkelby, Yorkshire. On 24 December 1660 he was created a baronet of Thirkleby.

Frankland was elected Member of Parliament for Thirsk in 1671, remaining its MP until 1685, when he was replaced by his son Thomas.

Frankland married Arabella Belasyse (d. 1687), daughter of Henry Belasyse in 1662, and they had four children:

- Thomas Frankland (1665–1726), who succeeded his father in the baronetcy and was also MP for Thirsk and for Hedon
- Henry Frankland of Sowerby (d. 1736)
- Rev. John Frankland, Dean of Ely and Vice Chancellor of Cambridge University
- Anne, who married Leonard Smelt of Kirkby Fletham, mother of Leonard Smelt

Parliament of England
Preceded by Sir Thomas Ingram; Walter Strickland	Member of Parliament for Thirsk; 1671–1685; With: Sir Thomas Ingram 1671–1673; Sir William Wentworth 1673–1679; Nicholas Saunderson 1679–1681; Sir William Ayscough 1681–1685	Succeeded by Thomas Frankland; Sir Hugh Cholmeley
Baronetage of England
New creation	Baronet (of Thirkelby); 1660–1697	Succeeded by Thomas Frankland
