= Sir Hugh Cholmeley, 4th Baronet =

English politician and baronet

Sir Hugh Cholmeley, 4th Baronet (21 July 1632 – 9 January 1689) was an English politician and baronet.

Born at Fyling Hall, near Whitby in Yorkshire, he was the second son of Sir Hugh Cholmeley, 1st Baronet and his wife Elizabeth Twysden, daughter of Sir William Twysden, 1st Baronet and Anne Finch. Cholmeley succeeded his nephew as baronet in 1665. and was afterwards appointed Governor of Tangier in Morocco by King Charles II of England. From February to August 1679, he was a Member of Parliament (MP) for Northampton, and from 1685 to 1687 for Thirsk.

On 19 February 1665, Cholmeley married Lady Anne Compton, oldest daughter of Spencer Compton, 2nd Earl of Northampton and Mary Beaumont at Hamerton in Huntingdonshire. They had a daughter, but no son, so with his death the baronetcy became extinct.

Cholmeley was described by Samuel Pepys, as a 'fine, worthy and well-disposed gentleman' with a seeming frustration for the Monarchy. In 1663, in partnership with John Lawson and the Earl of Teviot, then governor of Tangier, he set about the building of a mole harbour, of which he became ultimately the sole contractor. He based the construction in Tangier, on his experiences with the pier at Whitby.

Parliament of England
Preceded by Ralph Montagu; Sir William Fermor	Member of Parliament for Northampton; February 1679 – August 1679; With: Sir William Fermor	Succeeded by Ralph Montagu; William Langham
Preceded by Sir William Frankland; Sir William Ayscough	Member of Parliament for Thirsk; 1685 – 1687; With: Thomas Frankland	Succeeded by Thomas Frankland; Richard Staines
Baronetage of England
Preceded by Hugh Cholmeley	Baronet (of Whitby); 1665 – 1689	Extinct
Military offices
Preceded by John Middleton, Earl of Middleton	Governor of Tangier; 1670–1672	Succeeded by John Middleton, Earl of Middleton
