= Sir Godfrey Copley, 2nd Baronet =

English landowner, art-collector and Tory politician

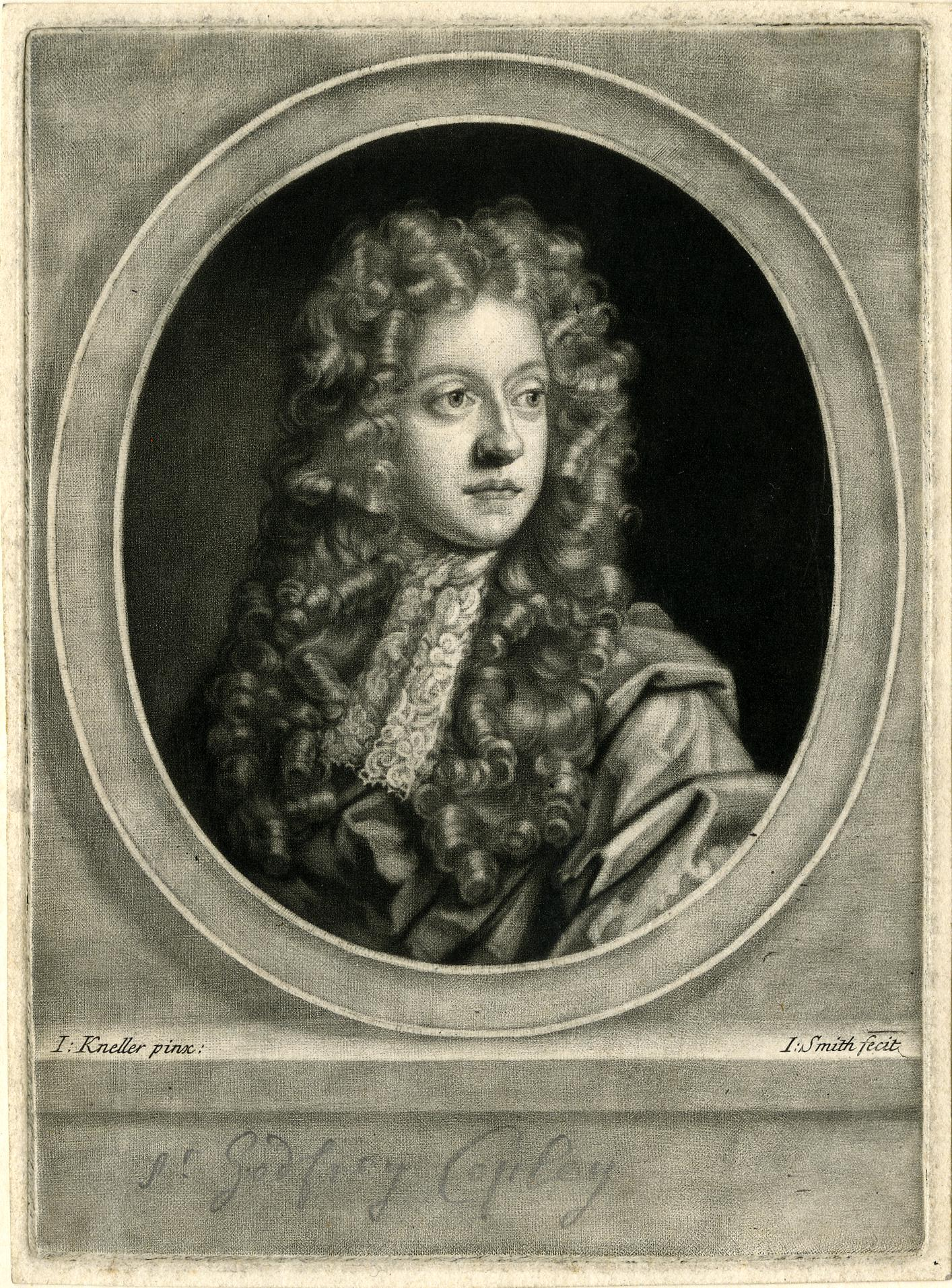
- Born: c. 1653
- Died: 9 April 1709
- Occupation: Politician
- Spouse(s): Catherine Purcell, Gertrude Carew
- Children: Catherine Copley
- Parents: Sir Godfrey Copley, 1st Baronet (father); Eleanor Walmesley (mother)
- Awards: Fellow of the Royal Society

Sir Godfrey Copley, 2nd Baronet FRS (/ˈkɒpli/; c. 1653 – 9 April 1709) of Sprotbrough House, near Doncaster, West Riding of Yorkshire, was an English landowner, art-collector and Tory politician who sat in the English and British House of Commons between 1679 and 1709.

== Early life ==
Copley was the son of Sir Godfrey Copley (1623–1677), who was created baronet by King Charles II in 1661, and his first wife Eleanor Walmesley, daughter of Sir Thomas Walmesley, MP, of Dunkenhalgh, Lancashire. He was admitted at Lincoln's Inn on 18 November 1674. He succeeded to his father's baronetcy and estates in February 1678 and continued his father's term in office as High Sheriff of Yorkshire from February to November 1678. He became a major landowner in Nottinghamshire and South Yorkshire, holding lands in Sprotbrough, Newton, Cusworth, Cadeby, Wildthorpe, Loversall, Doncaster, Bentley and Warmsworth, among other places.

== Career ==
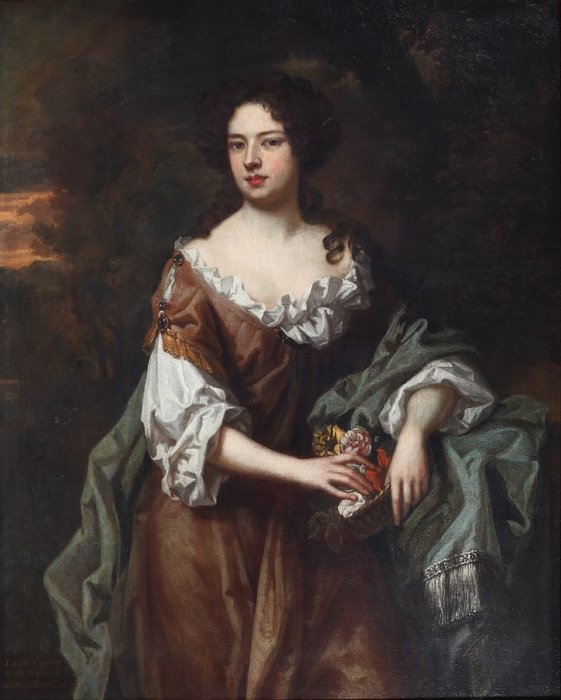
Catherine Purcell, attributed to Willem Wissing

Copley was returned as Member of Parliament for Aldborough in 1679 and sat to 1685. He was admitted at Inner Temple in 1681. He married Catherine, daughter of John Purcell of Nantcribba, Montgomeryshire by licence dated 15 October 1681. He was elected a member of the Royal Society in 1691. and regularly met with literary and political figures in London taverns, developing a wide range of interests in political matters. Following Catherine's death, he married again with a settlement dated 31 May 1700, Gertrude Carew, daughter of Sir John Carew, 3rd Baronet of Anthony, Cornwall.

Copley was returned as MP for Thirsk at the 1695 English general election and took an interest in matters of money and coinage. He was appointed commissioner for taking subscriptions to the land bank in 1696. He opposed the attainer against Sir John Fenwick. He turned his attention to local matters and was given leave to bring in a bill for making the River Don navigable on 30 December 1697, but the bill was disrupted and thrown out. He was returned again as MP for Thirsk at the 1698 English general election and was immediately involved in issues relating to the army and the disbanding of soldiers. He was appointed a commissioner for the Aire and Calder navigation in 1699.

Copley was returned to Parliament again at the two general elections of 1701 and was among those who supported the motion of 26 February 1702 which vindicated the proceedings of the Commons on the impeachments of the king's ministers in the previous Parliament. His long term interest in public finance came to fruition when he was elected as commissioner of public accounts in 1702. He was returned again at the 1702 English general election and was appointed controller of the accounts of the army from April 1704. At the 1705 English general election, he was returned for Thirsk again and voted for the Court candidate for Speaker on 25 October 1705. He was returned again for Thirsk at the 1708 British general election and was appointed to draft the bill to standardize the treason laws within the Union in January 1709, and to prohibit the importation of French wine and other goods more effectively in March 1709.

== Death and legacy ==
Moyle's Name Act 1767
- Act of Parliament
- Parliament of Great Britain
- Long title: An Act to enable Joseph Copley Esquire (lately called Joseph Moyle) and his Issue to take, use, and bear, the Surname and Arms of Copley, pursuant to the Will of Lionel Copley Esquire, deceased.
- Citation: 7 Geo. 3. c. 114 Pr.
- Territorial extent: Great Britain

Dates
- Royal assent: 29 June 1767
- Commencement: 11 November 1766 (Note: Start of session.)

Status: Current legislation

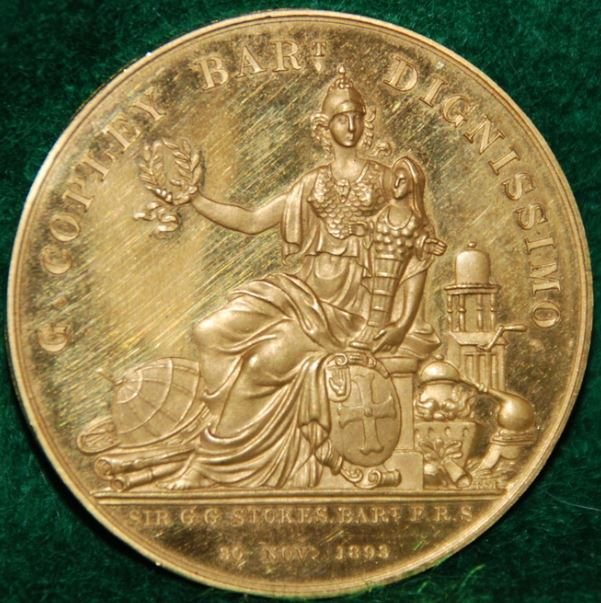
Copley Medal

Copley died at his house in Westminster on 9 April 1709 after a few days' sickness, and was buried at Sprotbrough. He had one surviving daughter Catherine by his first wife, but with no male heir the baronetcy became extinct. The estates were left to a distant cousin Lionel Copley after whom they passed in 1766 to Copley's grandson Joseph Moyle, son of his daughter Catherine and her husband Joseph Moyle of Beke, Cornwall. Moyle junior, who was Clerk of the Signet, changed his surname to Copley by a private act of Parliament, Moyle's Name Act 1767 (7 Geo. 3. c. 114 Pr.), on inheriting the Sprotbrough estate and was created a baronet in 1778.

Copley is noted for making a bequest of £100 to the Royal Society in London in 1709, which provided the funding for an annual award, the Copley Medal, the Society's premier award for scientific achievement. It is Britain's oldest scientific honour, a prestigious forerunner of the Nobel Prize, "in trust for the Royal Society of London for improving natural knowledge."

== Notes ==
Parliament of England
Preceded by Sir John Reresby, Bt; Henry Arthington	Member of Parliament for Aldborough; 1679–1685; With: Henry Arthington 1679; Sir Brian Stapylton, Bt 1679–1681< Sir John Reresby, Bt 1681–1685	Succeeded by Sir Michael Wentworth; Sir Roger Strickland
Preceded by Thomas Frankland; Richard Staines	Member of Parliament for Thirsk; 1695–1707; With: Richard Staines 1695–1698; Sir Thomas Frankland, Bt from 1698	Succeeded by Parliament of Great Britain
Parliament of Great Britain
Preceded by Parliament of England	Member of Parliament for Thirsk; 1707–1709; With: Sir Thomas Frankland, Bt	Succeeded by Sir Thomas Frankland, Bt; Leonard Smelt
Baronetage of England
Preceded by Godfrey Copley	Baronet (of Sprotborough); 1678–1709	Extinct
