= Sir Thomas Frankland, 6th Baronet =

English country landowner and politician

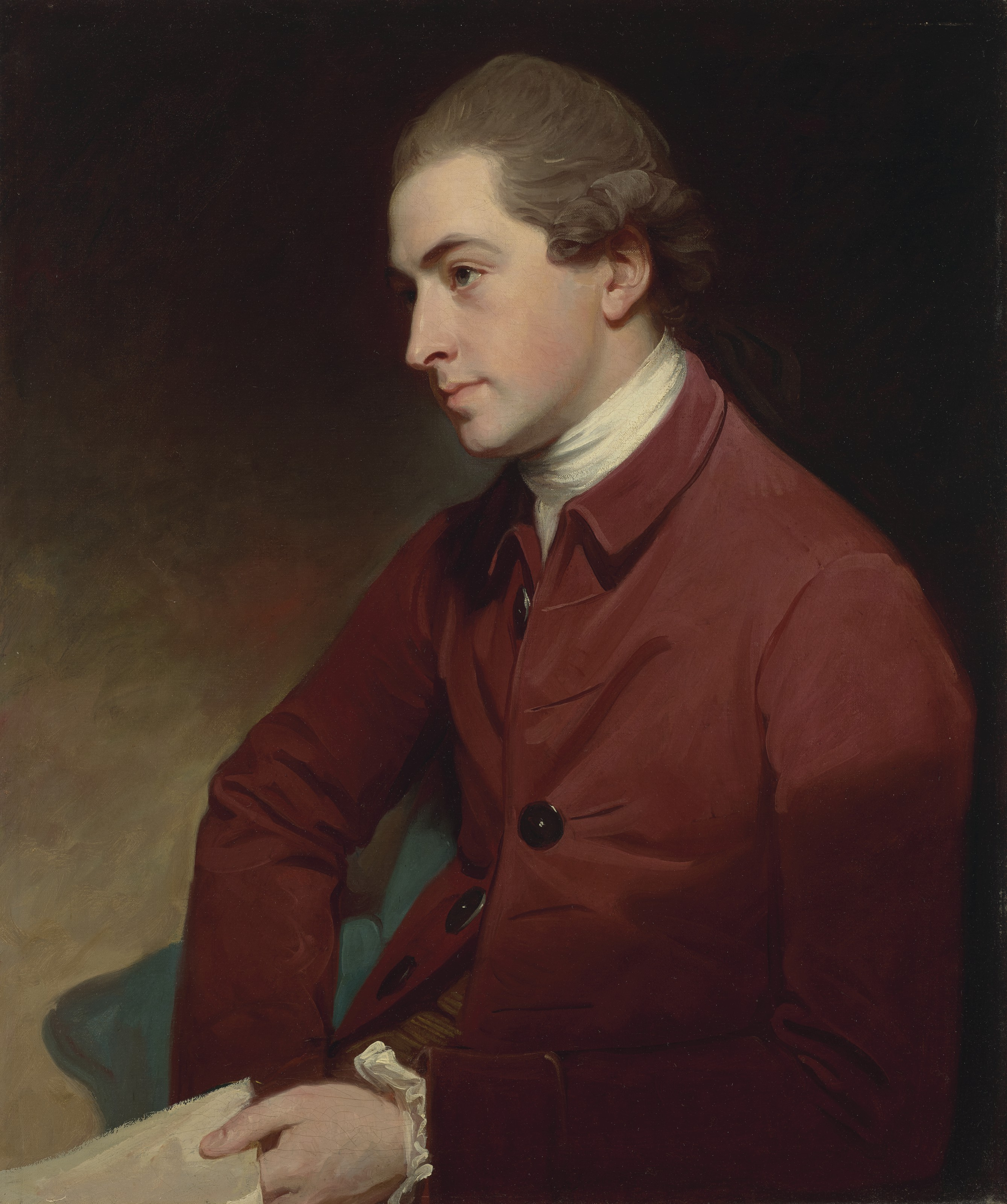
Portrait of Sir Thomas Frankland, 6th Baronet, 1777, by George Romney

Sir Thomas Frankland, 6th Baronet (September 1750 – 4 January 1831) was an English country landowner of Thirkleby, Yorkshire and politician who sat in the House of Commons in two sessions between 1774 and 1801. He was an eminent botanist from whom the genus Franklandia is named. Frankland was born in London, the eldest surviving son of Admiral Sir Thomas Frankland, 5th Baronet and his wife Sarah Rhett. He was educated at Eton College from 1761 to 1767 and matriculated at Merton College, Oxford in June 1768, becoming MA 4 on July 1771. In 1772 he entered Lincoln's Inn. He was an excellent naturalist being a botanist and florist, and was selected a Fellow of the Royal Society in 1773. He was also an authority on British sport. He married his cousin Dorothy Smelt, daughter of William Smelt of Bedale, Yorkshire on 7 March 1775.

Frankland was returned unopposed as Member of Parliament for Thirsk together with his father at the 1774 general election but did not stand in 1780. He does not appear to have spoken in his first term.

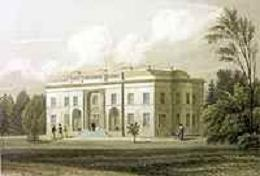
Thirkleby Hall circa 1800

Frankland succeeded to the baronetcy and Thirkleby Hall near Thirsk on the death of his father in 1784. He was left little fortune, but inherited the nomination of two seats in Parliament for Thirsk which were said to be worth between £8,000 and £10,000. In 1790 he commissioned James Wyatt to rebuild the Thirkleby Hall. He served as High Sheriff of Yorkshire for 1792–1793. In 1796, William Pitt the younger offered him a peerage in return for his two parliamentary seats at Thirsk. Frankland turned down the offer and returned himself as MP for Thirsk at the 1796 general election. He held the seat until 1801 when he brought in his brother William.

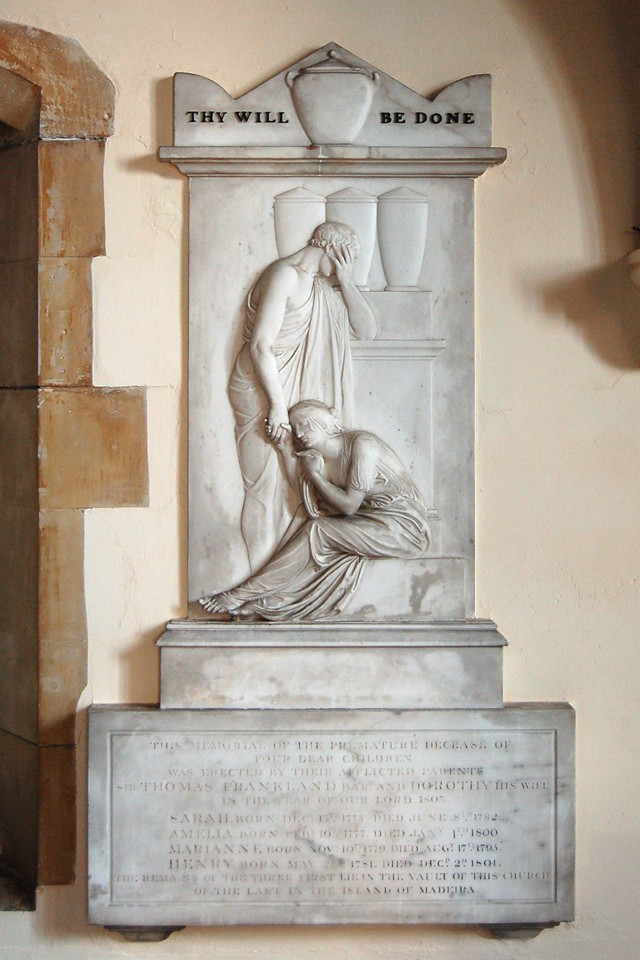
Frankland memorial by John Flaxman R.A.

Frankland died at Thirkleby Hall in 1831. He and his wife Dorothy had five children of whom only his heir, Sir Robert Frankland, 7th Baronet, survived. There is a memorial by sculptor John Flaxman R.A. to four of their children in All Saints Church, Great Thirkleby. Thirkleby estate was auctioned after the First World War but the hall was not sold; it was dismantled in 1927. Frankland wrote one of the first manuals on safe gun handling called Cautions to Young Sportsmen, first published in 1800.

Parliament of Great Britain
Preceded by William Frankland; Thomas Frankland	Member of Parliament for Thirsk; 1774–1780; With: Sir Thomas Frankland, Bt	Succeeded by Sir Thomas Gascoigne, Bt; Beilby Thompson
Preceded by Robert Vyner; Sir Gregory Page-Turner, Bt	Member of Parliament for Thirsk; 1796–1801; With: Sir Gregory Page-Turner, Bt	Succeeded by William Frankland; Sir Gregory Page-Turner, Bt
Honorary titles
Preceded by Sir George Armytage, Bt	High Sheriff of Yorkshire; 1792–1793	Succeeded by Richard Henry Beaumont
Baronetage of Great Britain
Preceded by Thomas Frankland	Baronet (of Thirkleby); 1784–1831	Succeeded by Robert Frankland
