= Robert Greenhill-Russell =

British politician

Escutcheon of the Greenhill-Russell baronets

Sir Robert Greenhill-Russell, 1st Baronet (1763 – 12 December 1836), born Robert Greenhill, was a British politician.

He was born in 1763 to the Rev. John Russell Greenhill and Elizabeth Noble. He was the grandson of Elizabeth Russell, who belonged to the Russell of Chequers Court family descended from Oliver Cromwell. He changed his last name to Greenhill-Russell upon inheriting Chequers from his father in 1815.

Between 1806 and 1832 he served as Member of Parliament for Thirsk. He was granted the title Baronet Greenhill-Russell of Chequers Court on 15 September 1831.

Greenhill-Russell died in 1836 and the baronetcy became extinct. Chequers passed into the hands of his kinsman Sir Robert Frankland-Russell, 7th Baronet. He was buried at Ellesborough, Bucks.

== Footnotes ==
Parliament of the United Kingdom
Preceded by William Frankland; Richard Griffin	Member of Parliament for Thirsk; 1806–1832; With: James Topping 1806–1807; William Frankland 1807–1815; Robert Frankland 1815–1832	Succeeded by Sir Robert Frankland, Bt
Baronetage of the United Kingdom
New creation	Baronet (of Chequers Court); 1831–1836	Extinct
Preceded by Key baronets	Greenhill-Russell baronets of Chequers Court; 15 September 1831	Succeeded by Anson baronets
