= Thomas Ingram (Royalist) =

English politician

Sir Thomas Ingram (1614 – 13 February 1672) was an English politician who sat in the House of Commons in two periods between 1640 and 1672. He supported the Royalist cause in the English Civil War.

== Biography ==
Ingram was the son of Sir Arthur Ingram of Temple Newsam, Yorkshire and his second wife Alice, daughter of William Ferrers (or Ferrars), mercer of London, and widow of John Holliday (1582–1610), son of Sir Leonard Holliday, former Lord Mayor of London. He was baptised on 23 June 1614 at Stratford Bow. The christening was attended by the Earl of Suffolk, the Earl of Somerset, and the Countess of Nottingham. King James came to the banquet.

Ingram was knighted at Newmarket on 16 October 1636. In 1640, he was elected Member of Parliament for Thirsk in the Long Parliament. He was commissioner of array for the King in Yorkshire in 1642 and was disabled from sitting in parliament on 2 September 1642. He compounded at £2,933 with the Parliamentary authorities for his estates in 1649.

Ingram sent £1,000 to the exiled court in June 1659, and took part in negotiations with the leading Presbyterians just before the Restoration. In June 1660 he was appointed a gentleman of the privy chamber and in July became a J.P. for Middlesex. In August 1660 he became Deputy Lieutenant for the North Riding of Yorkshire until 1661 and a commissioner for assessment for Middlesex. He was commissioner for trade from November 1660 to 1668. In 1661 he was re-elected MP for Thirsk in the Cavalier Parliament. He was commissioner for assessment for the North Riding from 1661 to 1669, Deputy Lieutenant for Middlesex from 1662, commissioner for corporations in Yorkshire from 1662 to 1663, commissioner for loyal and indigent officers for Middlesex, London, Westminster and Yorkshire in 1662 and commissioner for highways and sewers in London and Westminster in 1662. From 1663 to 1664 he was commissioner for assessment for Westminster and for the Duchy of Lancaster. In 1664 he became Chancellor of the Duchy of Lancaster and a Privy Councilor until his death. In 1665 he was commissioner for oyer and terminer in London and in 1666 became Deputy Lieutenant of Yorkshire.

Ingram died at the age of 58 and was buried in Westminster Abbey.

Ingram married Frances Belasyse, daughter of Thomas Belasyse, 1st Viscount Fauconberg in 1637, and had a daughter.

Parliament of England
| Preceded by John Belasyse; William Frankland | Member of Parliament for Thirsk; 1640–1642; With: John Belasyse | Succeeded by William Ayscough; Francis Lascelles |
