= Leonard Smelt (politician) =

English Whig politician

Leonard Smelt (c. 1683 – 30 May 1740) of Kirkby Fleetham, North Riding of Yorkshire, was an English Whig politician who sat in the House of Commons between 1709 and 1740.

== Early life ==
Smelt was the eldest son of Leonard Smelt of Kirkby Fleetham and his wife Grace Frankland, daughter of Sir William Frankland, 1st Baronet. He was admitted at Jesus College, Cambridge in 1700. His brother was William Smelt. He married Elizabeth Whitaker.

== Career ==
In 1709, in an unopposed by-election on 6 May for Thirsk, Smelt became the first person in his family to be an MP. This was thanks to an agreement between Ralph Bell and Smelt's mother's brother Thomas Frankland, the two main interests in the constituency, whereby Bell agreed to support Smelt in return for Frankland supporting Bell's nominee at the next election.

In 1710 Smelt succeeded his father to Kirkby Fleetham. In Parliament, he voted in favour of the impeachment of Henry Sacheverell. He stood down from Thirsk at the 1710 British general election as per the Frankland-Bell agreement but was returned for Northallerton at the 1713 British general election. He voted against the expulsion of Richard Steel.

Smelt was returned unopposed as MP for Northallerton at the 1715 British general election, after the House of Hanover took the British throne. He supported the Whig government and was appointed commissioner for army debts in 1715. He was returned unopposed again at the 1722 British general election and was appointed clerk of deliveries at the Board of Ordnance in 1722. At the 1727 British general election he was returned unopposed for Northallerton again. He was promoted to clerk at the Board of Ordnance in 1733. He was returned again for Northallerton at the 1734 British general election.

== Later life and legacy ==
Smelt paid for Northallerton to have a public clock and like his father was a trustee of Kettlewell's charity, which provided the town's poor with education, clothes, medicine and Bibles.

Smelt died without issue on 30 May 1740. The manor of Kirkby Fleetham passed to the Aislabie family.

Parliament of Great Britain
Preceded by Sir Godfrey Copley; Sir Thomas Frankland	Member of Parliament for Thirsk; 1709–1710; With: Sir Thomas Frankland	Succeeded by Ralph Bell; Sir Thomas Frankland
Preceded by Robert Raikes; Roger Gale	Member of Parliament for Northallerton; 1713–1740; With: Henry Peirse (1713–15); Cholmley Turner (1715–22); Henry Peirse (1722–40)	Succeeded by William Smelt; Henry Peirse
