= Thirsk (constituency) =

Parliamentary constituency in the United Kingdom, 1832–1885

- Former borough constituency for the House of Commons

1547–1885
- Seats: Two (until 1832); One (1832–1885)
- Replaced by: Thirsk and Malton

Thirsk was a parliamentary borough in Yorkshire, represented in the English and later British House of Commons in 1295, and again from 1547. It was represented by two Members of Parliament until 1832, and by one member from 1832 to 1885, when the constituency was abolished and absorbed into the new Thirsk and Malton division of the North Riding of Yorkshire.

The borough consisted of originally of the town of Old Thirsk, and included a population of only 1,378 at the 1831 census. The right to vote was restricted to the holders of burgage tenements, of which there were 50 in 1831. The Frankland family were the local landowners (in 1816 Sir Thomas owned 49 of the 50 burgage tenements), and in effect could nominate whoever they wanted as Members of Parliament; there was no contested election in Thirsk between 1715 and 1832.

The Great Reform Act 1832 expanded the boundaries to include the townships of Thirsk, Sowerby, Carlton Miniott, Sandhutton, Bagby and South Kilvington, increasing the population to 4,672 and encompassing 1,064 houses, which was considered big enough for the borough to retain one of its two members.

== History ==
The borough of Thirsk was held of the lords of the manor of Thirsk, and was governed by a bailiff and two constables who were elected annually by the burgesses (those owning designated burgage tenements). The bailiff, who was also the returning officer of the constituency, was sworn into office by the lord’s steward at the manorial court leet. When Thirsk became a parliamentary constituency in 1547, the lord of the manor was Edward Stanley, 3rd Earl of Derby. Despite this, the constituency appears to have been under the influence of the Council of the North, with at least 6 of the first 10 MPs apparently being nominated by the council. For example, Thomas Eynns was secretary of the Council and Reginald Beseley was a known supporter of the president of the council, the Earl of Shrewsbury.

The Stanley family did not notably exert their influence until the 1597 election of George Leycester, an associate of the 6th Earl, William Stanley. Through the early 17th century, Stanley’s influence declined as he faced a dispute with Alice Stanley (the widow of his brother Ferdinando Stanley, 5th Earl of Derby) over the stewardship of the manor, which was resolved only shortly before Charles I dissolved parliament in 1629 and began the Personal Rule. Instead, the Council of the North retained their large influence over the constituency in the early Stuart period, alongside members of the local gentry. This included the prominent Belasyse family, who secured a parliamentary seat in almost every election between 1586 and 1640. In the elections of 1624, 1625, and 1626, both members for Thirsk were related to the Belasyse family. In the Long Parliament of November 1640, Thirsk was represented by John Belasyse and his brother-in-law Thomas Ingram.

== Members of Parliament ==
- Constituency re-created (1547)

=== Parliament of England (1547–1707) ===
Parliament	Election	First member	Second member
1st of Edward VI	1547	Sir William Cavendish	Robert Flint
2nd of Edward VI	1553 (Mar)	Thomas Lee	Reginald Beseley
1st of Mary I	1553 (Oct)	Thomas Eynns	John Gascoigne
2nd of Mary I	1554 (Apr)	Thomas Waterton	Reginald Beseley
3rd of Mary I	1554 (Nov)	Christopher Lascelles	Edward Beseley
4th of Mary I	1555	Christopher Lascelles	Robert Roos
5th of Mary I	1558	Christopher Lascelles	Thomas Eynns
1st of Elizabeth I	1558/9	Thomas Eynns	Francis Wilstrop
2nd of Elizabeth I	1562/3	Thomas Eynns	Christopher Lascelles
3rd of Elizabeth I	1571	John Dawney	Thomas Layton
4th of Elizabeth I	1572	John Dawney	Edward Gates
5th of Elizabeth I	1584	John Dawney	Robert Bowes
6th of Elizabeth I	1586	John Dawney	Henry Bellasis
7th of Elizabeth I	1588/9	John Dawney	Henry Bellasis
8th of Elizabeth I	1593	John Dawney	Henry Bellasis
9th of Elizabeth I	1597	George Leycester	Thomas Belasyse
10th of Elizabeth I	1601	Henry Bellasis	John Mallory
1st of James I	1604	Sir Edward Swift	Timothy Whittingham
2nd of James I	1614	Sir Thomas Belasyse	Sir Robert Yaxley
3rd of James I	1620	Sir Thomas Belasyse	Sir John Gibson
4th of James I	1624	Sir Thomas Belasyse	William Sheffield
1st of Charles I	1625	Henry Belasyse	Henry Stanley
2nd of Charles I	1626	Henry Belasyse	William Cholmley
3rd of Charles I	1628	Christopher Wandesford	William Frankland I
No parliaments summoned between 1629 and 1640
4th of Charles I	1640 (Apr)	William Frankland I	John Belasyse
Long Parliament	1640 (Nov)	Sir Thomas Ingram	John Belasyse
Ingram and Belasyse both disabled from sitting in September 1642
Long Parliament	1645	William Ayscough	Francis Lascelles
Rump Parliament	1648	excluded in Pride's Purge	Francis Lascelles
Barebone's Parliament	1653	Thirsk excluded as a borough	
1st Protectorate	1654	Thirsk excluded as a borough	
2nd Protectorate	1656	Thirsk excluded as a borough	
3rd Protectorate	1659 (Jan)	Col. Thomas Talbot	Sir John Goodricke
Rump Parliament and Long Parliament restored in 1659, but Thirsk was not represented
1st of Charles II	1660	Barrington Bourchier	William Stanley
1st of Charles II	1660 (by-election)	Barrington Bourchier	Charles Kerr, Earl of Ancram
2nd of Charles II	1661	Sir Thomas Ingram	Walter Strickland
2nd of Charles II	1671 (by-election)	Sir Thomas Ingram	Sir William Frankland II
2nd of Charles II	1673 (by-election)	Sir William Wentworth	Sir William Frankland II
3rd of Charles II	1679 (Mar)	Nicholas Saunderson	Sir William Frankland II
4th of Charles II	1679 (Oct)	Nicholas Saunderson	Sir William Frankland II
5th of Charles II	1681	Sir William Ayscough	Sir William Frankland II
1st of James II	1685	Sir Thomas Frankland I	Sir Hugh Cholmeley
1st of William III & Mary II	1689	Sir Thomas Frankland I	Richard Staines
2nd of William III & Mary II	1690	Sir Thomas Frankland I	Richard Staines
3rd of William III	1695	Sir Godfrey Copley	Richard Staines
4th of William III	1698	Sir Godfrey Copley	Sir Thomas Frankland I
5th of William III	1701 (Feb)	Sir Godfrey Copley	Sir Thomas Frankland I
6th of William III	1701 (Dec)	Sir Godfrey Copley	Sir Thomas Frankland I
1st of Anne	1702	Sir Godfrey Copley	Sir Thomas Frankland I
2nd of Anne	1705	Sir Godfrey Copley	Sir Thomas Frankland I

=== Parliament of Great Britain (1707–1800) ===
Monarch	Parl.	Start date	First member	Second member
Anne	1st	1707	Sir Thomas Frankland I	Sir Godfrey Copley
Anne	2nd	1708	Sir Thomas Frankland I	Sir Godfrey Copley
Anne	2nd	1709 (by-election)	Sir Thomas Frankland I	Leonard Smelt
Anne	3rd	1710	Sir Thomas Frankland I	Ralph Bell
Anne	3rd	1711 (by-election)	Thomas Worsley	Ralph Bell
Anne	4th	1713	Sir Thomas Frankland II	Ralph Bell
George I	5th	1715	Sir Thomas Frankland II	Ralph Bell
George I	5th	1717 (by-election)	Sir Thomas Frankland II	Thomas Pitt
George I	6th	1722	Sir Thomas Frankland II	William St Quintin
George II	7th	1727	Sir Thomas Frankland II	Thomas Robinson
George II	8th	1734	Sir Thomas Frankland II	Frederick Meinhardt Frankland
George II	9th	1741	Sir Thomas Frankland II	Frederick Meinhardt Frankland
George II	9th	1747 (by-election)	Sir Thomas Frankland III	Frederick Meinhardt Frankland
George II	10th	1747	Sir Thomas Frankland III	Frederick Meinhardt Frankland
George II	10th	1749 (by-election)	Sir Thomas Frankland III	William Monckton
George II	11th	1754	Sir Thomas Frankland III	Roger Talbot
George III	12th	1761	Sir Thomas Frankland III	Henry Grenville
George III	12th	1765 (by-election)	Sir Thomas Frankland III	James Grenville
George III	13th	1768	Sir Thomas Frankland III	William Frankland III
George III	14th	1774	Sir Thomas Frankland III	Thomas Frankland IV
George III	15th	1780	Sir Thomas Gascoigne	Beilby Thompson
George III	16th	1784	Sir Thomas Frankland III	Sir Gregory Page-Turner
George III	16th	1785 (by-election)	Robert Vyner	Sir Gregory Page-Turner
George III	17th	1790	Robert Vyner	Sir Gregory Page-Turner
George III	18th	1796	Sir Thomas Frankland IV	Sir Gregory Page-Turner

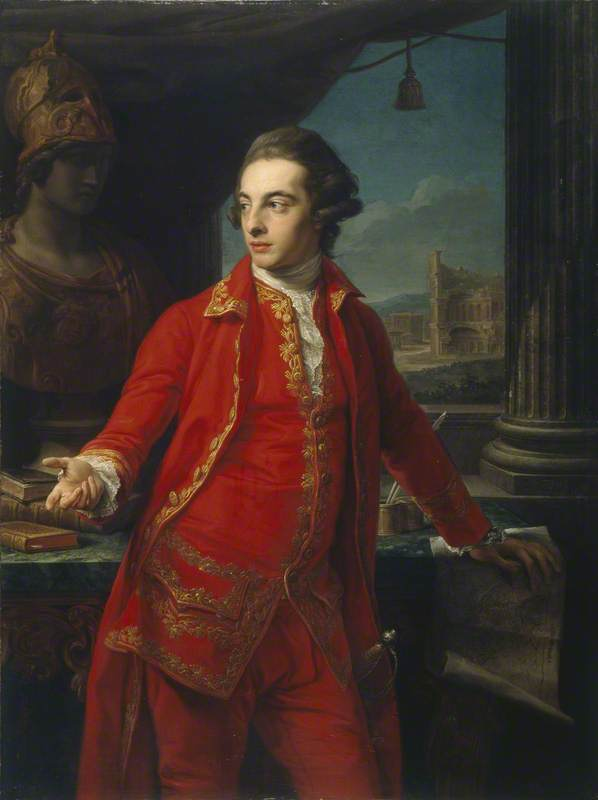
Portrait of Sir Gregory Page-Turner by Pompeo Batoni, 1768

=== Parliament of the United Kingdom (1801–1885) ===
==== Before the Reform Act 1832 ====
Year	First member	First party	Second member	Second party
1801	Sir Thomas Frankland IV		Sir Gregory Page-Turner	
1802	William Frankland		Sir Gregory Page-Turner	
1805	William Frankland		Hon. Richard Griffin	
1806	James Topping		Robert Greenhill-Russell	Whig
1807	William Frankland	Whig	Robert Greenhill-Russell	Whig
1815	Robert Frankland	Whig	Robert Greenhill-Russell	Whig
1832	Representation reduced to one member			

==== After the Reform Act 1832 ====
Election	Member	Party
1832	Sir Robert Frankland	Whig
1834 by-election	Samuel Crompton	Whig
1841	John Bell	Whig
March 1851 by-election	Sir William Payne-Gallwey	Conservative
1880	Hon. Lewis Payn Dawnay	Conservative
1885	constituency abolished	

== Election results ==
=== Contested elections (1832) ===
General election 1868: Thirsk
Party	Candidate	Votes	%	±%
Conservative	William Payne-Gallwey	416	51.6	N/A
Liberal	Harcourt Vanden-Bempde-Johnstone	390	48.4	New
Majority		26	3.2	N/A
Turnout		806	89.4	N/A
Registered electors		902		
Conservative hold		Swing	N/A	

General election 1874: Thirsk
Party	Candidate	Votes	%	±%
Conservative	William Payne-Gallwey	410	50.1	−1.5
Liberal	Henry Miles Stapylton	409	49.9	+1.5
Majority		1	0.2	−3.0
Turnout		819	87.6	−1.8
Registered electors		935		
Conservative hold		Swing	−1.5	

General election 1880: Thirsk
Party	Candidate	Votes	%	±%
Conservative	Lewis Payn Dawnay	485	52.9	+2.8
Liberal	Henry Miles Stapylton	422	46.0	−3.9
Conservative	Sir William Frankland, 9th Baronet	10	1.1	N/A
Majority		63	6.9	+6.7
Turnout		917	90.4	+2.8
Registered electors		1,014		
Conservative hold		Swing	+3.4	
