= Henry Belasyse (1604–1647) =

Royalist soldier and politician (1604–1647)

Henry Belasyse JP
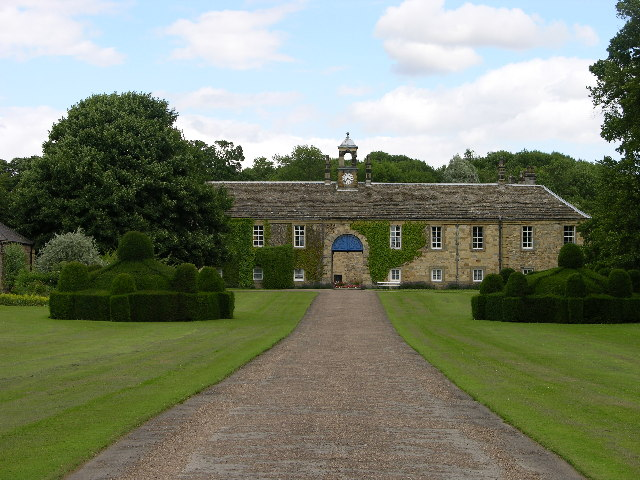
- Family home at Newburgh Priory, extensively rebuilt in the early 18th century

Deputy Lieutenant of the North Riding of Yorkshire
- In office January 1642 – September 1642

Member of Parliament for Yorkshire 1628
- In office November 1640 – September 1642 (excluded)

Member of Parliament for Thirsk 1625
- In office February 1626 – June 1626

Personal details
- Born: 20 May 1604 Newburgh Priory, Yorkshire
- Died: 20 May 1647 (aged 43) Newburgh Priory, Yorkshire
- Resting place: St. Michael's Church, Coxwold
- Party: Royalist
- Spouse: Grace Barton (1622-his death)
- Children: Thomas (1627-1701); Henry (?); Rowland (1632-1699); Charles (1643-1673); Grace (1635-1667); Frances (1636-after 1667); Arabella (1638-1687); Barbara (ca 1642-1708)
- Education: Trinity College, Cambridge
- Occupation: Landowner and politician

The Honourable Henry Belasyse, or Bellasis, May 1604 to May 1647, was an English politician from Yorkshire who sat in the House of Commons of England variously between 1625 and 1642.

A reluctant Royalist during the First English Civil War, his eldest son Thomas married the daughter of Oliver Cromwell. He predeceased his father in May 1647.

== Biography ==
Belasyse was the son of Thomas Belasyse, 1st Viscount Fauconberg and his wife Barbara Cholmeley. He matriculated at Trinity College, Cambridge in 1615, and was admitted to Lincoln's Inn in 1619.

In 1625 Belasyse was elected Member of Parliament for Thirsk until 1626. In 1628 he was elected MP for Yorkshire and sat until 1629 when King Charles decided to rule without parliament. In April 1640, he was re-elected for Yorkshire in the Short Parliament, and was elected for Yorkshire again in November 1640 for the Long Parliament. He supported the King and was disabled from sitting in parliament in 1642.

Belasyse died at the age of 43, predeceasing his father.

== Family ==
Belasyse married Grace Barton, daughter of Sir Thomas Barton. They had the following children:

- Thomas, who inherited the title Viscount Fauconberg from his grandfather in 1652, was created Earl of Fauconberg, and was ambassador to the Princes of Italy.
- Henry, predeceased his father.
- Roland, who was made a Knight of the Bath.
- John, who died young.
- Grace, who married George Saunderson, 5th Viscount Castleton.
- Frances, who married Sir Henry Jones of Oxford.
- Arabella, who married Sir William Frankland, 1st Baronet of Thirkley.
- Barbara, who married Sir Walter Strickland.

== Notes ==
Parliament of England
Preceded by Sir Thomas Belasyse; Sir William Sheffield	Member of Parliament for Thirsk; 1625–1626; With: Henry Stanley 1625; William Cholmeley 1626	Succeeded by Christopher Wandesford; William Frankland
Preceded by John Savile; Sir William Constable, Bt	Member of Parliament for Yorkshire; 1628–1629; With: Sir Thomas Wentworth 1628; Sir Henry Savile, Bt 1629	Parliament suspended until 1640
Vacant Parliament suspended since 1629	Member of Parliament for Yorkshire; 1640–1642; With: Sir William Savile, 3rd Baronet; Ferdinando, Lord Fairfax	Not represented in Rump Parliament
