= Sir Thomas Frankland, 5th Baronet =

Royal Navy Admiral, politician and slave trader (1718–1784)

Admiral Sir Thomas Frankland Bt
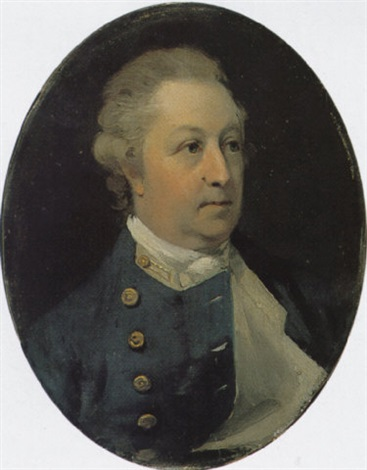
- Portrait by Henry Walton
- Born: 26 June 1718; India
- Died: 21 November 1784 (aged 66); Bath, Somerset
- Military career
- Allegiance: Kingdom of Great Britain
- Branch: Royal Navy
- Service years: 1731–1784
- Rank: Admiral
- Commands: HMS Rose; HMS Dragon; Leeward Islands Station
- Conflicts: War of the Austrian Succession; Seven Years' War

Admiral Sir Thomas Frankland, 5th Baronet (26 June 1718 – 21 November 1784) was a Royal Navy officer, politician and slave trader. He was the second son of Henry Frankland and Mary Cross. Frankland was born in the East Indies (probably India), his father being a member of the East India Company and briefly Governor of Bengal.

== Naval career ==
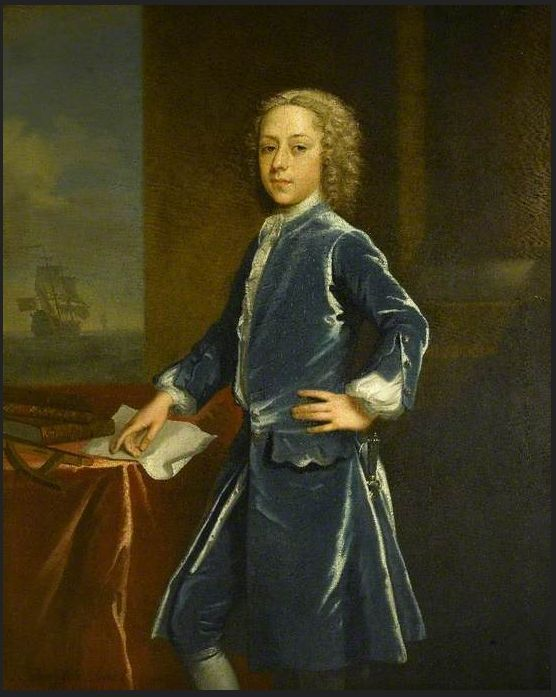
Midshipman Thomas Frankland

He entered the navy in 1731, serving in HMS York under Capt. Philip Vanbrugh, HMS Scarborough, and HMS Oxford before becoming a lieutenant in 1737. On 23 February 1738, he was sent to HMS Chatham, again under Capt. Vanbrugh, where he served for two years. He was briefly transferred to HMS Cumberland in March 1740 before promotion to captain on 15 July 1740 aboard HMS Rose.

He was promptly assigned to carry the newly appointed Governor of the Bahamas, John Tinker, to the islands, and remained in the Bahamas until 1746, fighting Spanish privateers and taking a number of prizes. He then returned home and was given command of HMS Dragon and sent to the West Indies. On 31 July 1755, he was given command of the Leeward Islands Station as a commodore, arriving aboard HMS Winchester in October. Able but stubborn and of a difficult temper, he was involved in quarrels with his predecessor, Thomas Pye, and the local authorities in Antigua. He was promoted rear admiral while there, but refusing to accede to the Admiralty's wish to control some of the patronage at his disposal (declaring in a letter to the secretary "I have friends of my own to provide for") fell into immediate disfavour with his superiors. On 5 May 1757, he was replaced by Commodore John Moore, and returned to England in October, never to return to active duty. His promotions, however, continued in the usual manner as he gained seniority, culminating in the rank of Admiral of the White. During his stay in the West Indies he was actively involved in the Atlantic slave trade.

He had entered Parliament for the family's borough of Thirsk in 1747, and held the seat until 1780, when he sought the governorship of Greenwich Hospital. Unsuccessful, he returned as member for Thirsk in April 1784, but died in November of that year. He had inherited the baronetcy from his older brother in 1768.

A monument to his memory was erected in Chichester Cathedral sculpted by John Flaxman.

The Frankland Islands off Queensland were named after him.

== Family ==
He married Sarah Rhett (of South Carolina, d. 1808) in May 1743 and had a large number of children, of whom nine survived him:

- Sir Thomas Frankland, 6th Baronet (1750–1831)
- Roger Frankland (d. 1826), canon of Wells, married in 1792 Catherine Colville, daughter of John Colville, 8th Lord Colville of Culross and had issue
- Mary Frankland, married Sir Boyle Roche, 1st Baronet
- Anne Frankland (d. 1842), married first John Lewis (by whom she bore Thomas Frankland Lewis), second Rev. Robert Hare
- Dinah Frankland, married William Bowles, by whom she had issue Admiral of the Fleet Sir William Bowles
- Catharine Frankland, married Thomas Whinyates, once captain of HMS Frolic
- Charlotte Frankland, married Robert Nicholas M.P.
- Grace Frankland (d. 1801), married Matthew Gosset (d. 6 Sept 1842)
- William Frankland (d. 10 June 1816), no issue

== Other sources ==
- A. W. H. Pearsall, 'Frankland, Sir Thomas, fifth baronet (1718–1784)’, Oxford Dictionary of National Biography, Oxford University Press, 2004 accessed 16 Sept 2006

Military offices
Preceded by Thomas Pye	Commander-in-Chief, Leeward Islands Station; 1756–1758	Succeeded by John Moore
Parliament of Great Britain
Preceded by Sir Thomas Frankland, Bt; Frederick Meinhardt Frankland	Member of Parliament for Thirsk; 1747 – 1780; With: Frederick Meinhardt Frankland 1747–1749; William Monckton 1749–1754; Roger Talbot 1754–1761; Henry Grenville 1761–1765; James Grenville 1765–1768; William Frankland 1768–1774; Thomas Frankland 1774–1780	Succeeded by Sir Thomas Gascoigne, Bt; Beilby Thompson
Preceded by Sir Thomas Gascoigne, Bt; Beilby Thompson	Member of Parliament for Thirsk; Apr. 1784 – Nov. 1784; With: Sir Geoffrey Page-Turner, Bt	Succeeded by Sir Geoffrey Page-Turner, Bt; Robert Vyner
Baronetage of England
Preceded by Charles Henry Frankland	Baronet (of Thirkleby); 1768–1784	Succeeded by Thomas Frankland
