= Thirkleby High and Low with Osgodby =

Civil parish in North Yorkshire, England

Coordinates: 54.203°N 1.271°W

Thirkleby
- Civil parish
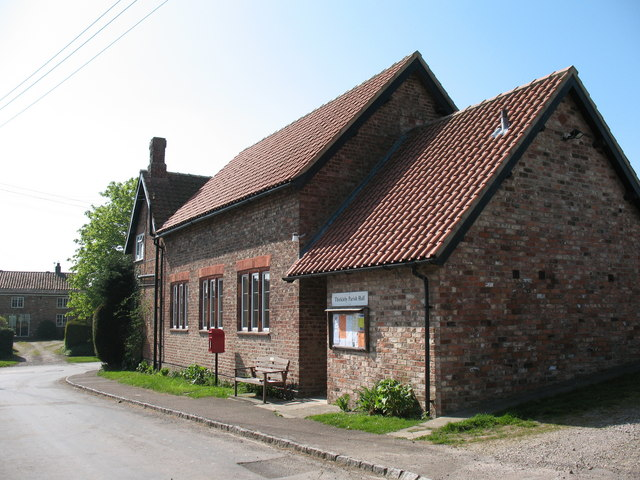
- Village Hall, Great Thirkleby

- Location within North Yorkshire
- Population: 266 (2011 census)
- OS grid reference: SE476788
- Civil parish: Thirkleby High and Low with Osgodby
- Unitary authority: North Yorkshire
- Ceremonial county: North Yorkshire
- Region: Yorkshire and the Humber
- Country: England
- Sovereign state: United Kingdom
- Post town: THIRSK
- Postcode district: YO7
- Police: North Yorkshire
- Fire: North Yorkshire
- Ambulance: Yorkshire
- UK Parliament: Thirsk and Malton

Thirkleby High and Low with Osgodby is a civil parish in North Yorkshire, England. The parish includes the villages of Great Thirkleby and Little Thirkleby and the scattered hamlet of Osgodby. The similarly named medieval settlement of Thirkleby Manor is around 30 miles north, in the parish of Kirby Grindalythe. The population of the civil parish taken at the 2011 Census was 266.

== History ==
The Domesday Book mentions the village of Thirkleby as "Turchilebi" in the wapentake of Yarlestre and belonging to the Coxwold manor. There were 54 villagers, and the land consisted of ploughed fields and woodland. At the time of the Norman invasion, the lands belonged to Kofse, but soon afterwards they were granted to Hugh, son of Baldric. Soon afterwards, the manor was in the hands of the Mowbray family, and it followed the descent of the manor of Thirsk until the 16th century. A mesne lordship was held in the parish by Robert de Buscy in the 12th century, with some land granted to Byland Abbey. The Buscy family held this land until at least 1348. Other landowners in the 12th century in the manor were the Meynell family. Some of their land seems to have been granted by marriage to the de Burton family, who also held lands in West Harlsey.

The greater manor passed from the Buscy family to the Crown following their involvement in the 1322 uprisings. They were acquired by Sir Thomas Ughtred in 1361. The manor was sold to Sir Roger Fulthorpe in 1383 and remained in the family until the late 16th century, when it was seized by the Crown. It was subsequently sold to the Earl of Warwick, who sold it in turn to William Frankland. It remained in the Frankland family, though not always in the direct line of succession, until the late 19th century.

The lesser manor passed from the de Burton family to Marmaduke Darell in 1363 and thereafter followed the inheritance of the manor of Sessay. The lands that make up Osgodby were those that were granted to the church.

The toponymy is derived from the Danish personal name of Thorkel or Thirkel, suffixed with by to give the meaning of Thorkel's farm.

Thirkleby Hall used to stand to the west of Great Thirkleby. It was built between 1780 and 1785 for Sir Thomas Frankland, 6th Baronet and was situated in around 200 acres (81 ha) of grounds. At the end of the First World War, the estate was without any heir and was auctioned off, except for the hall which did not find a buyer until 1927 when it was dismantled entirely. The grounds are now used for holiday accommodation in the form of cottages and static caravans.

Prisoner of war camp number 108 was built at Sandhill (on Low Road at the southern edge of Little Thirkleby) as a working camp for German prisoners during the Second World War. It has been used as a pig farm for many years, but the water tower and many of the buildings have survived.

A Roman fort was discovered at Thirkleby in 2018, through the study of aerial photography. The fort is considered to date to the Flavian period on the basis of its layout.

== Governance ==
The village lies within the Thirsk and Malton UK Parliament constituency. From 1974 to 2023 it was part of the Hambleton District. It is now administered by the unitary North Yorkshire Council.

== Geography ==
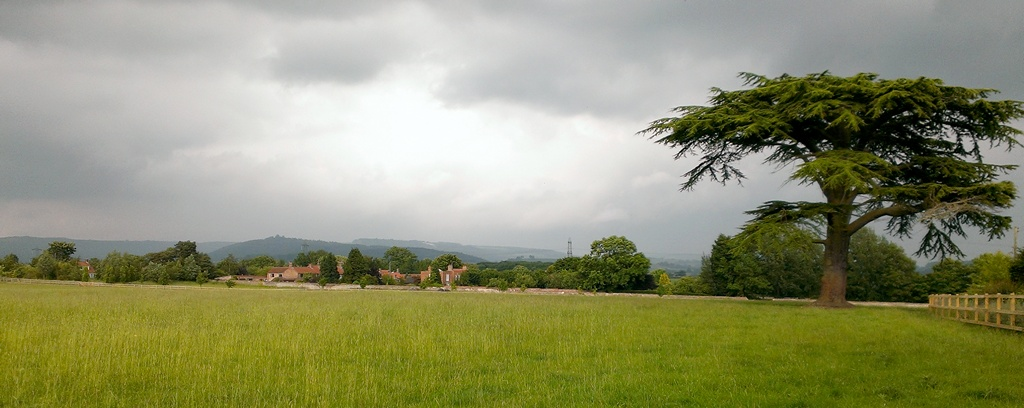
View of Great Thirkleby towards The White Horse at Kilburn

The parish is 2,592 acres (1,049 ha) in size. The parish consists of the villages of Great (or High) Thirkleby and Little (or Low) Thirkleby, and the scattered hamlet of Osgodby. Thirkleby Beck divides Great and Little Thirkleby and runs south as part of the tributary system of the River Swale. The A19 road passes north-westward through the southern part of the parish. The two villages are linked by Arden Bridge, which is a Grade II listed structure probably built by John Carr in the 18th century.

The nearest settlements to the centre point of the two villages are Bagby 1.3 miles (2.1 km) to the north-west, Kilburn 2.3 miles (3.7 km) to the east, Carlton Husthwaite 1.8 miles (2.9 km) to the south-east and Hutton Sessay 1.5 miles (2.4 km) to the south.

== Demography ==
In 1881, the UK Census recorded the population as 261. In 2001 the UK Census recorded a population of 224, of whom 47.8% were male and 52.2% were female, and 191 were over the age of sixteen years. The 2011 UK Census recorded a population of 266, of which 47.4% were male and 52.6% were female and 232 were over the age of sixteen years. Population density was recorded as 0.2 per hectare.

== Religion ==
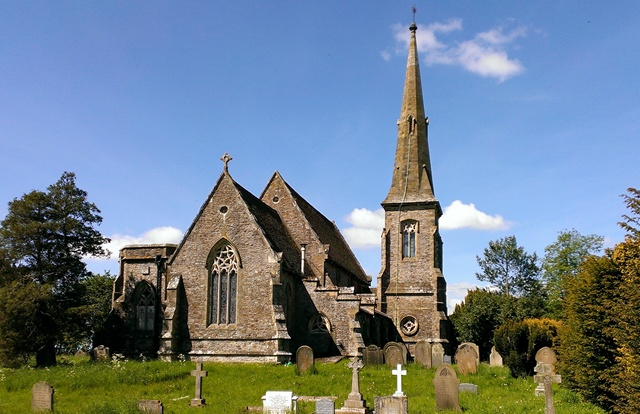
All Saints, Great Thirkleby, Thirsk, North Yorkshire

All Saints' Church, Thirkleby is a Grade II* listed building. It was designed by Victorian architect Edward Buckton Lamb and built in 1851 for Lady Frankland-Russell of Thirkleby Park, in memory of her husband Robert. The burial vault of the earlier church was retained but the fine pews were moved to the church of St Andrew's at Blubberhouses (another Frankland-Russell estate church also designed by E. B. Lamb). All Saints has several Frankland memorials and other monumental inscriptions, including a fine piece by the sculptor John Flaxman.

== Notable residents ==
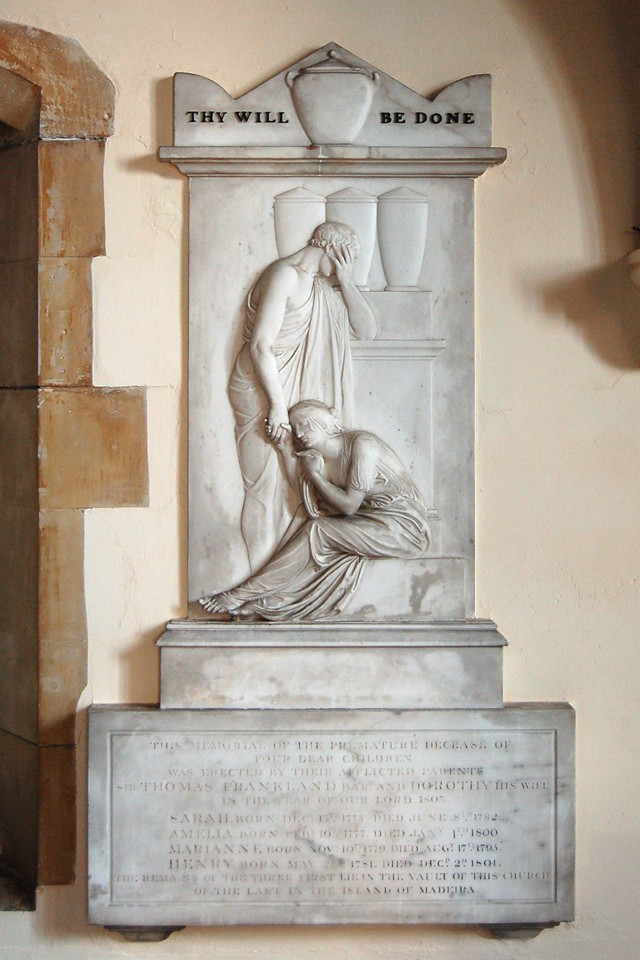
Memorial to Sir Thomas Frankland's children by John Flaxman R.A.

- Sir Thomas Frankland – Admiral of the White, Governor of Bengal, MP for Thirsk (1747–1780 and 1784). The Frankland Islands off the Queensland coast are named after him.

== See also ==
- Listed buildings in Thirkleby High and Low with Osgodby
