= Russell baronets of Chippenham (1629) =

Escutcheon of the Russell Baronets of Chippenham

The Russell baronetcy, of Chippenham, Cambridgeshire, was created in the Baronetage of England on 19 January 1629 for William Russell. He represented Windsor in Parliament. The 2nd Baronet sat as Member of Parliament for Cambridgeshire under the Commonwealth. The title is presumed to have become extinct on the death of the 10th Baronet in 1804.

== Russell baronets, of Chippenham (1629) ==
- Sir William Russell, 1st Baronet (died 1654)
- Sir Francis Russell, 2nd Baronet (c. 1616–1664)
- Sir John Russell, 3rd Baronet (1640–1669)
- Sir William Russell, 4th Baronet (died 1707)
- Sir William Russell, 5th Baronet (died 1738)
- Sir Francis Russell, 6th Baronet (died c. 1750)
- Sir William Russell, 7th Baronet (died 1757)
- Sir John Russell, 8th Baronet (1741–1783)
- Sir John Russell, 9th Baronet (1777–1802)
- Sir George Russell, 10th Baronet (1780–1804). He died without heir.
