= Sir Francis Russell, 2nd Baronet =

Sir Francis Russell, 2nd Baronet may refer to:

- Sir Francis Russell, 2nd Baronet, of Chippenham (c. 1616–1664), Member of Parliament for Cambridgeshire and a soldier for the parliamentary cause during the English Civil War
- Sir Francis Russell, 2nd Baronet, of Wytley (1637–1706), Member of Parliament for Tewkesbury 1673–1690

== See also ==
- Russell baronets
