= John Russell (colonial administrator) =

British colonial administrator (1670–1735)

- Born: 14 October 1670
- Died: 5 December 1735 (aged 65)
- Occupation: Colonial administrator
- Known for: President of Bengal
- Spouse: Mary Eyre
- Children: 4
- Parent(s): Sir John Russell, 3rd Baronet; Frances Cromwell

John Russell (14 October 1670 – 5 December 1735) was an administrator of the English East India Company.

== Life ==
The posthumous third son of Sir John Russell, 3rd Baronet and Frances Cromwell, he was on his mother's side a grandson of Oliver Cromwell. He was elected a factor of the East India Company in 1693, and went to Bengal in 1694.

Russell served as President of Bengal, succeeding Anthony Weltden in the post in 1711.

== Family ==
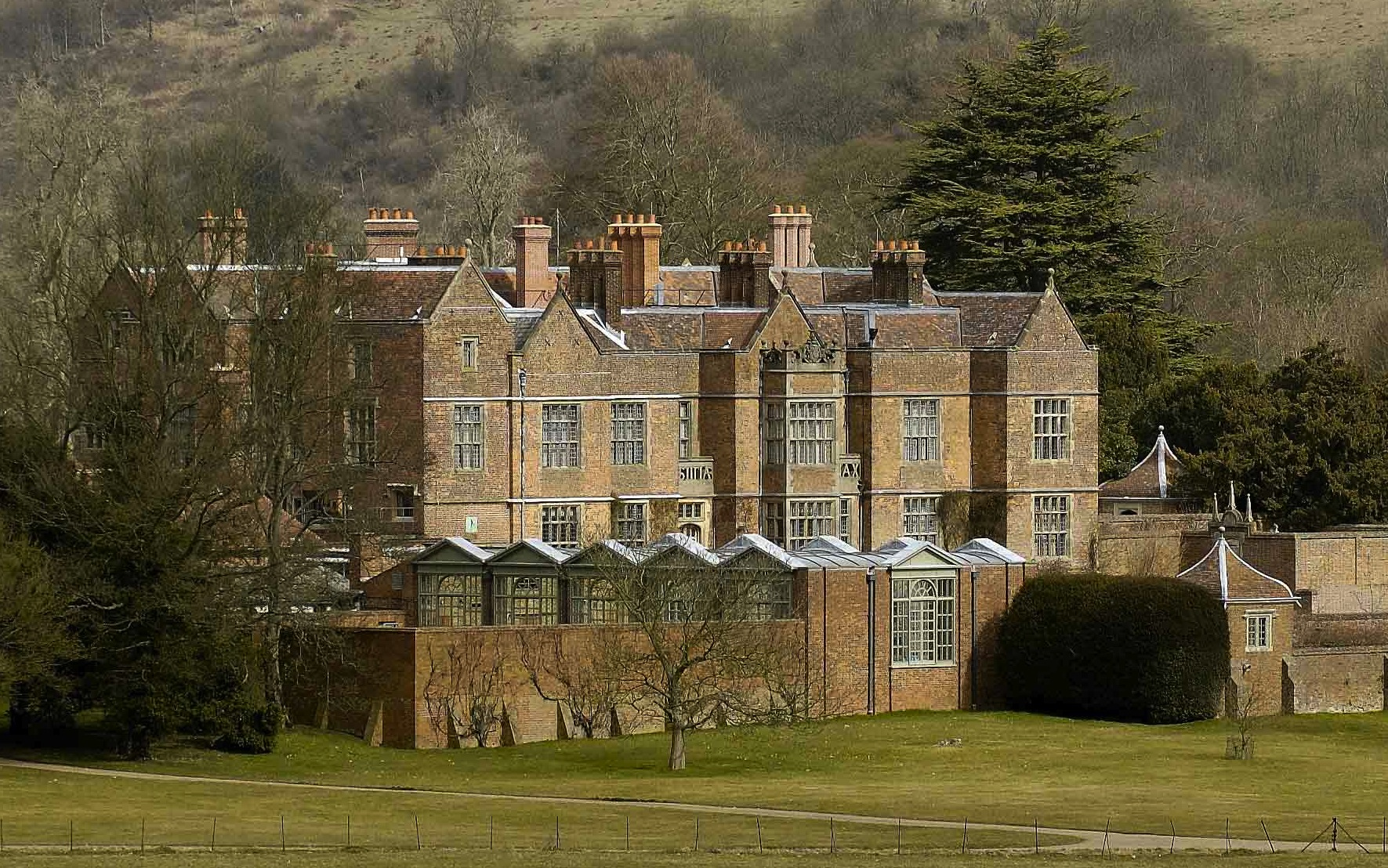
Chequers

On 17 December 1697, Russell married Mary Eyre, sister of Sir Charles Eyre. They had one son and three daughters:

- Col. Charles Russell (1700–1754), colonel of the 34th Regiment of Foot, married Mary Johanna Cutts Revett, daughter of Col. Edmund Revett, and had issue, including Sir John Russell, 8th Baronet
- Frances Russell, married John Revett, son of Col. Edmund Revett, became bedchamber woman to Princess Amelia of Great Britain
- Mary Russell, married Josiah Holmes, without issue
- Elizabeth Russell, married Samuel Greenhill, mother of John Russell Greenhill

On 7 September 1715, after returning from India, he married Joanna, the daughter and heiress of John Thurbane, of Chequers, and widow of Col. Edmund Revett, who had inherited Chequers, now the British Prime Minister's country residence, from her father. They had one daughter, Anne, who died an infant. Chequers passed to his eldest son Charles.

Political offices
Preceded by Anthony Weltden	President of Bengal; 4 March 1711 – 3 December 1713	Succeeded by Robert Hedges
