= Sir William Russell, 1st Baronet, of Chippenham =

English politician (died 1654)

Sir William Russell, 1st Baronet, of Chippenham (before 1585 – 1654), was an English politician who sat as MP for New Windsor. He was a prominent member of several of the great trading companies. He was Treasurer of the Navy from 1618 until c. 1627, and was reappointed in 1630. He was created Baronet of Chippenham in 1630.

== Biography ==
William was the son of William Russell of Egham, Surrey and Joan Sanders. He travelled to Russia before attending Gray's Inn in 1631.

Williams was sworn a free brother of the East India Company on 20 October 1609, "having formerly bought Sir Francis Cherry's adventure", and became a director on 5 July 1615. He was appointed a director of the North-West Passage Company in July 1612. For many years he traded as an adventurer in the Muscovy Company, but, dissatisfied with the management, withdrew his capital. He afterwards became involved in legal proceedings with the company.

In May 1618 he bought the treasurership of the navy from Sir Robert Mansell. He held this office until about 1627, when Sir Sackville Crowe succeeded him. But the latter appears to have been so incompetent that Russell was reappointed in January 1630 and created a baronet. In 1632 he was appointed a commissioner to inquire into frauds on the customs; on 11 January 1639 Sir Henry Vane was associated with him in the treasurership of the navy. A man of considerable wealth, Russell frequently lent money to the government of Charles I. He was one of the promoters of the Persian Company, to which he subscribed £3,000, and took part in numerous projects for draining the Fens. In his last years he was much troubled by ill health, especially gout, and by his daughter Anne's marital difficulties. He died in 1654, and was buried (3 February) at Chippenham, Cambridgeshire.

== Family ==
Russell married three times. His first wife was Elizabeth, daughter of Sir Francis Cherry.

His second wife (also named Elizabeth) was the daughter of Thomas Gerard of Burwell, Cambridgeshire, by whom he had seven sons and three daughters. Of these:

- Francis, the eldest, succeeded as second baronet, and his daughter Elizabeth married Henry Cromwell (son of Oliver);
- William, the second son, was knighted and called "Black" Sir William
- Gerard, the third son, was the father of William Russell of Fordham (died 1701), who married Elizabeth, daughter of Henry Cromwell.
- Anne, married John Bodvel in 1638.
- Sarah married Thomas Chicheley in 1635.
- Elizabeth (died 1671) married firstly Edward Lewkenor of Denham in Suffolk, and secondly John Gauden, Bishop of Worcester, who died in 1662. Samuel Pepys admired her for her charm and good conversation.

Russell's third wife, again named Elizabeth, was the daughter and co-heiress of Michael Smallpage of Chichester, and widow of John Wheatley of Catsfield, Sussex, by whom he had two sons. Of these:

- William, was knighted and called "White" Sir William, and was created a baronet on 8 November 1660; the dignity became extinct on his death without male issue.

== Notes ==
Parliament of England
Preceded by Edmund Sawyer; William Hewett	Member of Parliament for New Windsor; 1625–1626; With: Humphrey Newbury	Succeeded by William Beecher; Thomas Hewett
Political offices
Preceded by Sir Robert Mansell	Treasurer of the Navy; 1618–1627	Succeeded by Sackville Crowe
Preceded by Sir Sackville Crowe	Treasurer of the Navy; 1630–1654; With: Henry Vane 1639–1642; Sir John Penington 1642–1646	Succeeded by Sir Henry Vane
Baronetage of England
New creation	Baronet (of Chippenham); 1629–1654	Succeeded by Francis Russell
