= Sir John Russell, 3rd Baronet =

British Baronet

Sir John Russell, 3rd Baronet (1632? – 1669), first a Royalist, but afterwards a colonel of foot for Parliament and distinguished himself at the Battle of Marston Moor, and in the Protectorate's wars in Ireland and Flanders.

Russell was the first son of Sir Francis Russell, 2nd Baronet. He was originally a Royalist, but later a colonel of foot under the Parliamentary general the Earl of Manchester, and distinguished himself both at the Battle of Marston Moor, and in the protector's wars in Ireland and Flanders. He enjoyed the office of chamberlain of Chester during these times, and probably many others of consequence.

Sir John died in 1669, and was buried in Chippenham, on 24 March of the same year.

Russell married Frances Cromwell, youngest daughter of the Protector Oliver Cromwell, and widow of Lord Robert Rich, predeceased son of Robert Rich, 3rd Earl of Warwick. She long survived Sir John, spending the latter part of her life with her sister Lady Fauconberg, though she had so great a jointure from her first husband, that she was a great misfortune to the Russell family, having dissipated the greatest part of the very fine estate at Chippenham. Sir John and Lady Frances had three sons and two daughters:

1. Sir William Russell, 4th Baronet (c. 1660–1725)
2. Christian Russell (d. 1669), died young
3. Elizabeth Russell (1664–1733), married Sir Thomas Frankland, 2nd Baronet of Thirkelby.
4. Maj.-Gen. Rich Russell (c. 1667–1735)
5. John Russell (1670–1735), President of Bengal

== Notes ==
Baronetage of England
Preceded by Francis Russell	Baronet (of Chippenham); 1664–1669	Succeeded by William Russell
