= Sir Francis Russell, 2nd Baronet, of Chippenham =

Sir Francis Russell, 2nd Baronet (c. 1616 – 1664) was a Member of Parliament and a soldier for the parliamentary cause during the English Civil War. During the Interregnum he held several positions including membership in Cromwell's House of Lords.

== Biography ==
Francis Russell, the son and heir of Sir William Russell, 1st Baronet, was returned as a member for Cambridgeshire in the Long Parliament. He sided with Parliament in its dispute with Charles I. For his activity in the services of the former, he was appointed by them on 20 August 1642, deputy-lieutenant of the county of Cambridge, at which time an indemnity was ordered to be carried from the Commons to the Lords for him (jointly with Oliver Cromwell, and Valentine Walton) for preventing the removal of silver plate from Cambridge to York, and to which the Lords assented.

The Parliament gave Russell a colonel's commission upon the breaking out of the wars; they appointed him governor of the isle of Ely, (if not of Crowland also) governor of the city of Lichfield; which, in 1643, he was obliged to surrender to Prince Rupert, and afterwards he had the government of the isles of Jersey and Guernsey given him.

During the protectorate Oliver Cromwell entrusted Russell, now related to him through the marriage of Henry Cromwell to Russell's daughter Elizabeth, with many employments, Russell returned a member of Parliament for Cambridgeshire in 1654 and 1656; and was chosen by Cromwell to be a member of Cromwell's House of Lords.

Sir Francis succeeded his father in his baronetcy in 1654, survived the restoration of the monarchy, and was buried at Chippenham, Cambridgeshire, on 30 April 1664.

== Family ==
Sir Francis married Catherine, (daughter and sole heir of John Wheatley, esq. and Elizabeth Smallpage), in Chippenham on 19 December 1631. They had seven sons and seven daughters:

1. Sir John Russell, 3rd Baronet
2. William Russell, baptized at Chippenham, 9 March 1635; probably he died young.
3. Robert Russell, born at Chippenham, 21 October 1644; he resided at Feckenham, and at Mildenhall, in Suffolk. He married a widow, who was the daughter and co-heir of Thomas Soame, of Thurlow, in Suffolk, a captain of foot in the service of King Charles I.
4. Gerard Russell, born at Chippenham, 2 January 1646; he was a Hamburg merchant and married the daughter of — Yonker, a merchant of that city.
5. Killephet Russell, born at Chippenham, 21 April 1647 and buried at the same place on 16 April 1650.
6. Killephet Russell, esq. born at Chippenham, 11 March 1652. He resided at Mildenhall, in Suffolk, and married; his son Francis died an infant, and was buried 1 October 1680, at Isleham, in Cambridgeshire.
7. Edward Ruflell, baptized at Chippenham, 12 October 1653.
8. Elizabeth, who married Henry Cromwell, lord-lieutenant of Ireland, second son of Oliver Cromwell.
9. Sarah, baptized at Chippenham 14 May 1636 died while an infant.
10. Sarah, baptized at Chippenham 3 May 1637, died while an infant.
11. Sarah, baptized at Chippenham, 24 August 1638. This lady first married John Reynolds, of Cambridgeshire, esq. a famous officer in the service of the Parliament, the Commonwealth, and of the Protectorate. Left a wealthy widow with no children, she remarried Henry, Earl of Thomond and had several children with him.
12. Frances, baptized at Chippenham, 18 November 1648, she became the wife of John Hagar, of Bourn, in the county of Cambridge.
13. Ann, baptized at Chippenham, 14 July 1650, was married to Hugh Underwood, of Whittlesey, in the isle of Ely and who was one of the deputy-lieutenants of that isle; she was his second wife.
14. Catherine, baptized at Chippenham, 23 December 1651, it is supposed she became the wife of — Sheers, of Hertfordshire.

== Notes ==
Parliament of England
Preceded by Sir Dudley North; Thomas Chicheley	Member of Parliament for Cambridgeshire; 1645–1653; With: Sir Dudley North 1645–1648	Succeeded by John Sadler; Thomas French; Robert Castle; Samuel Warner
Preceded by John Sadler; Thomas French; Robert Castle; Samuel Warner	Member of Parliament for Cambridgeshire; 1654–1658; With: John Delbrow 1654–1656; Henry Pickering 1654–1658; Robert Castle 1654–1658; Robert West 1656–1658	Succeeded by Sir Thomas Willys, Bt; Sir Henry Pickering
Baronetage of England
Preceded by William Russell	Baronet (of Chippenham); 1654–1664	Succeeded by John Russell
