= Frances Cromwell =

Daughter of Oliver Cromwell (1638–1720)

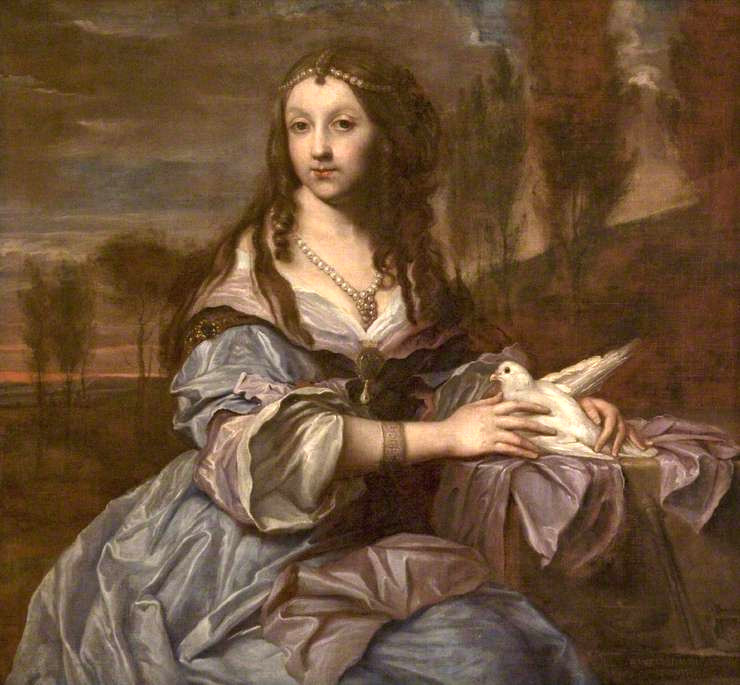
- by John Michael Wright
- Born: Frances Cromwell; 6 December 1638; Ely, Cambridgeshire, England
- Died: 27 January 1720 (aged 81); London, England
- Spouses: Robert Rich (m. 1657; died 1658) Sir John Russell, 3rd Baronet (m. 1663; died 1669)
- Children: 5, including John
- Parent(s): Oliver Cromwell; Elizabeth Bourchier
- Relatives: Cromwell family

Frances Cromwell, Lady Russell (c. 6 December 1638 – 27 January 1720) was the ninth child and youngest daughter of Oliver Cromwell, Lord Protector of the Commonwealth of England, Scotland and Ireland, and his wife, Elizabeth Cromwell. She was baptized at St Mary's Church, Ely on 6 December 1638.

== Family and marriage ==
After growing up in the Cromwell family home, Frances moved to both Whitehall and Hampton Court when her parents became the protector and protectress of England. Historians have linked her to several suitors, amongst them Charles II, but she did not marry until 11 November 1657 when she wed Robert Rich (1634–1658), grandson of Robert Rich, second earl of Warwick (1587–1658), and only son and heir of Robert Rich, Lord Rich (1611–1659). After a difficult courtship and days of celebration the marriage was short-lived: Rich, who had been ill at the time of the marriage, died 16 February 1658 at Whitehall.

Five years later, on 7 May 1663 Frances married Sir John Russell. Russell died in March 1669. Frances raised their five children, before spending the latter part of her life with her sister Mary and her husband Thomas.

== Children ==
Sir John and Lady Russell had three sons and two daughters:

- Sir William Russell, 4th Baronet (c. 1660–1725)
- Christina Russell (d. 1669)
- Frances Elizabeth Russell (1664–1733), ancestor of Katharine, Duchess of Kent.
- Maj.-Gen. Rich Russell (c. 1667–1735)
- John Russell (1670–1735), President of Bengal
