= Henry Vane the Younger =

English politician and colonial administrator (1613–1662)

Sir Henry Vane the Younger
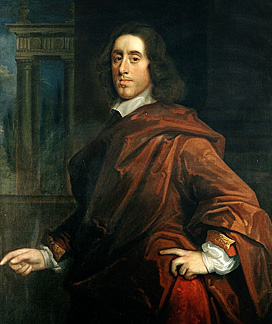

5th Governor of the Massachusetts Bay Colony
- In office 25 May 1636 – 17 May 1637
- Preceded by: John Haynes
- Succeeded by: John Winthrop

Joint Treasurer of the Navy
- In office 1639–1642
- Preceded by: Sir William Russell
- Succeeded by: Sir John Penington

Joint Treasurer of the Navy
- In office 1645–1650
- Preceded by: Sir William Russell
- Succeeded by: Richard Hutchinson

Member of the English Parliament for Kingston upon Hull (UK Parliament constituency)
- In office April 1640 – November 1650 Serving with Sir John Lister (died 1640) followed by Peregine Pelham
- Preceded by: No Parliaments convened 1629-1640
- Succeeded by: Not represented in the Barebones' Parliament

Member of the English Council of State
- In office 17 Feb 1649 – 20 Apr 1653

Lord President of the English Council of State
- In office 17 May 1652 – 14 June 1652
- Preceded by: Henry Rolle
- Succeeded by: The Earl of Pembroke

Member of the English Council of State
- In office 19 May 1659 – 25 Oct 1659

Member of the English Committee of Safety
- In office 26 Oct 1659 – 25 Dec 1659

Member of the English Parliament for Whitchurch (UK Parliament constituency)
- In office January 1659 – May 1659 Serving with none (Second seat was vacant)
- Preceded by: Not represented in the Barebones' nor First and Second Protectorates Parliament
- Succeeded by: Not represented in the restored Rump Parliament

Member of the English Parliament for Kingston upon Hull (UK Parliament constituency)
- In office May 1659 – January 1660 Serving with none (Second seat was vacant)
- Preceded by: John Ramsden
- Succeeded by: John Ramsden

Personal details
- Born: baptised 26 March 1613 Debden, Essex, England
- Died: 14 June 1662 (aged 49) Tower Hill, London
- Children: 10, including Christopher

Arms of Vane: Azure, three gauntlets (appaumée) These are a difference of the arms of the Fane family, Earls of Westmorland from 1624, which show: three dexter clenched gauntlets back affrontée, with identical tinctures

Sir Henry Vane (1613 – 14 June 1662), often referred to as Harry Vane and Henry Vane the Younger to distinguish him from his father, was an English politician and colonial administrator. He was briefly present in North America, serving one term as the governor of the Massachusetts Bay Colony (1636-37), and supported the creation of Roger Williams' Rhode Island Colony and Harvard College. A proponent of religious tolerance, as governor, he defended Anne Hutchinson and her right to teach religious topics in her home; this put him in direct conflict with the Puritan leaders in the Massachusetts Colony. He returned to England after losing re-election and eventually, Hutchinson was banned from the colony.

He was a leading Parliamentarian during the English Civil War and worked closely with Oliver Cromwell. He played no part in the execution of King Charles I in 1649. He left Parliament in disgust at Pride's Purge in December 1648 and did not return until weeks after the King's execution. He refused to take an oath approving the King's execution. Vane served on the Council of State that functioned as the government executive during the Interregnum, but split with Cromwell over issues of governance and removed himself from power when Cromwell dissolved Parliament in 1653. He returned to power during the short-lived Commonwealth period from 1659–1660, following the death of Oliver Cromwell in 1658 and the failure of the rule of his son and successor Richard Cromwell. His fight for government reform, a constitution, and civil and religious liberties made him a man "too dangerous to let live" in King Charles II's view. He was arrested under orders from Charles II following his restoration to the throne in 1660. After a long debate, Vane was exempted from the Indemnity and Oblivion Act, and he was denied the amnesty granted to most men for their roles in the Civil War and Interregnum.

Although he was formally granted clemency by Charles II, he was indicted for high treason by a Middlesex grand jury after charges were presented by the king's attorney general, Sir Geoffrey Palmer, in 1662. In a court proceeding in which he was denied counsel and the opportunity to properly prepare a defence, he was convicted by a Royalist jury. Charles withdrew his earlier clemency, and Vane was beheaded on Tower Hill on 14 June 1662.

Vane was recognised by his political peers as a competent administrator and persuasive negotiator and politician. His politics were driven by a desire for religious tolerance in an era when governments were used to establish official churches and suppress dissenting views. Although his views were in a small minority, he was able to successfully build coalitions to advance his agenda. His actions contributed to both the rise and downfall of the English Commonwealth. His books and pamphlets written on political and religious subjects are still analyzed today. His writing A Healing Question advocated for a civilian government based on popular consent and a written constitution. Vane argued against military rule, proposing that legal authority should be derived from the people's representatives. This pamphlet laid the framework which would be implemented in the American constitution. It also proposed a constitutional convention, pre-dating the American Constitutional Convention by over a century. Vane is remembered in Massachusetts and Rhode Island as an early champion of liberty.

The New England Historical and Genealogical Society wrote of him in 1848:

Those who have been accustomed to view Roger Williams in his true character, – a great and wonderful man, a pioneer in establishing religious and consequently political liberty, – must accord the same virtues to Sir Henry Vane. It is true, the latter did not lay down his life here in our land, nor was he compelled to fly to the wilderness to enjoy his opinions; but he did die for them, when and where the greatest good would accrue to the world. If Roger Williams deserves all the praise and admiration from posterity which he now has, and which are sure to increase in all future time, Sir Henry Vane certainly deserves no less.

== Early life ==
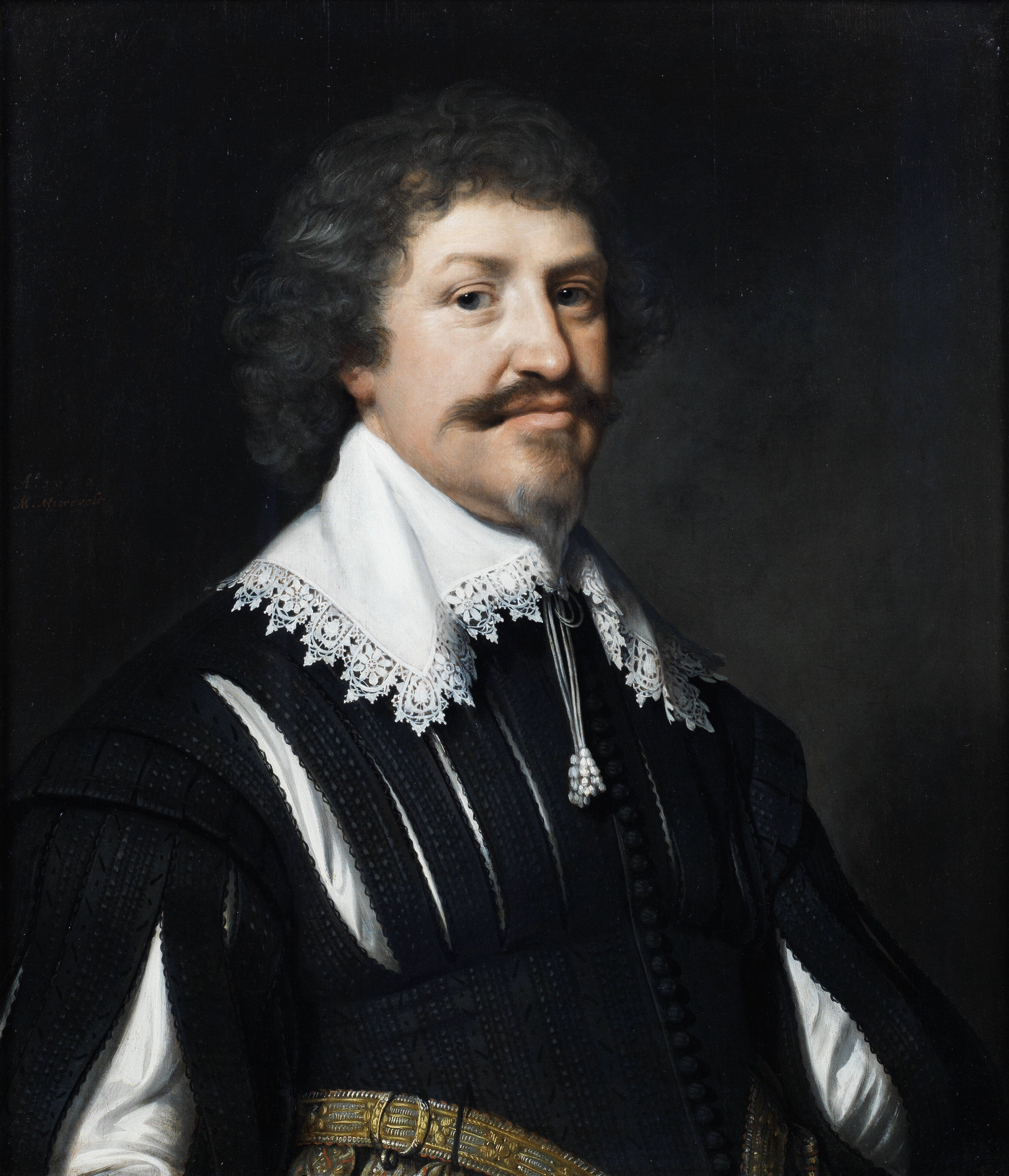
Sir Henry Vane the Elder, portrait by Michiel Janszoon van Mierevelt

Henry Vane was baptised on 26 May 1613 at Debden, Essex. He was the eldest child of Sir Henry Vane the Elder, who came from the landed gentry, and Frances Darcy, who came from minor nobility. The elder Vane used the family's money to purchase positions at court, rising by 1629 to be Comptroller of the Household. Vane was educated at Westminster School, where his classmates included Arthur Heselrige and Thomas Scot, two other men who would figure prominently in English politics. Vane's friend and biographer, George Sikes, wrote that Vane was "[ignorant] of God" and of a temperament that made him "acceptable to those they call good fellows", but that he had a religious awakening at 14 or 15, after which he "and his former jolly company came to a parting blow." Vane then enrolled at Magdalen Hall, Oxford, where he studied in spite of his refusal to take the necessary matriculation oaths. He then travelled to Europe, where he was reported to be studying at Leiden and possibly in France and at Geneva.

Vane's father had been upset by his open adoption of Puritan views, fearing this would hamper his opportunities for advancement at court. In 1631 he sent the young Vane to Vienna as an assistant to Robert Anstruther, the English ambassador. This was apparently a quite privileged role, for Vane's writings of the time include messages written in French and in cipher.

During this trip the elder Vane was sent to negotiate with Swedish king Gustavus for an alliance; King Charles' unwillingness to act in the matter meant the effort was in vain. He was introduced to the king after returning to England, and encouraged by his father to seek a position in the privy chamber. His father engaged in numerous attempts to get him to give up his nonconformist views, without success. In order to worship as he chose, Vane then decided to go the New World, joining the Puritan migration.

== New England ==
Vane left for the Massachusetts Bay Colony, arriving in Boston in October 1635 on a ship also carrying John Winthrop the Younger and Hugh Peter. The elder John Winthrop described Vane as "a young gentleman of excellent parts", and by the following month he had already been admitted as a freeman in the colony. He began playing a role in its judicial administration, deciding whether legal disputes had sufficient merit to be heard by a full court. Vane was instrumental in brokering the resolution to a dispute between the elder Winthrop and Thomas Dudley concerning matters of judicial conduct. In May 1636 Vane was elected governor of the colony, succeeding John Haynes. The situation he faced was complex, with issues on religious, political and military fronts and as a young man of twenty-three years, he was ill-prepared.

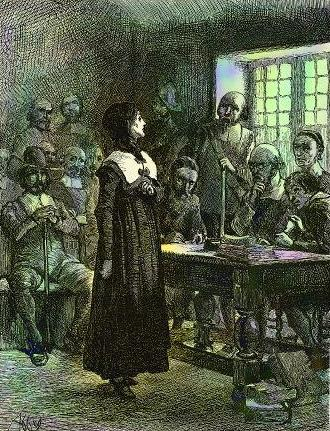
A 1901 artist’s impression of the trial of Anne Hutchinson.

The colony was split over the actions and beliefs of Anne Hutchinson. She had come with her husband and children to the colony in 1634. During Vane's time as governor, she began holding Bible sessions at home, gaining a wide audience and sharing her opinions that the colonial leaders labelled as Antinomianism, the view that existing laws and practices were not necessary for salvation. Most of the older colonial leadership, including Dudley and Winthrop, espoused a more legalistic view. Vane was a supporter of Hutchinson and attended her Bible studies, as was at first the influential pastor John Cotton. Vane, however, immediately alienated some of the colonists by insisting on flying the English flag over Boston's fort. The flag had recently been the subject of controversy, since its depiction of the Cross of St George was seen by many colonists as a symbol of papacy, and John Endecott had notoriously cut the cross out of the Salem militia's flag. Vane's popularity declined further when he learnt in December 1636 that there were issues in England requiring his presence, and he attempted to resign. Although the court of assistants accepted his resignation, he withdrew it upon the request of the congregation of the Boston church.

During Vane's tenure a dispute with the Pequot tribe of present-day southeastern Connecticut boiled over into war. In 1636 the boat of a Massachusetts trader named John Oldham was found near Block Island, overrun by Indians. Further examination by the discoverers (after the Indians fled in canoes) uncovered Oldham's body on board. The attackers were at the time believed to be from tribes affiliated with the Narragansetts, but Narragansett leaders claimed that those responsible had fled to the protection of the Pequots. The Pequots were aggressively expansionist in their dealings with the surrounding native tribes (including the Narragansett), but had until then generally kept the peace with the nearby colonists. Massachusetts authorities were already angry that the Pequots had failed to turn over men implicated in the killing of another trader on the Connecticut River; the slaying of Oldham led to calls for action.

Despite the fact that Roger Williams had warned him that the Narragansetts were more likely responsible for Oldham's slaying, Governor Vane in August 1636 placed John Endecott at the head of a 90-man force to extract justice from the Pequots. Endecott's heavy-handed expedition did little more than destroy Pequot settlements, and sparked a military backlash. The Pequots struck back at settlements recently established on the Connecticut River by colonists from Massachusetts, and at the Saybrook Colony of the younger John Winthrop. In April 1637, Vane called a session of the general court that authorised the colonial militia to assist the other New England colonies in continuing the war.

Vane lost his position to the elder John Winthrop in the 1637 election. The contentious election was marked by a sharp disagreement over the treatment of John Wheelwright, another Hutchinson supporter. Winthrop won in part because the location of the vote was moved to Cambridge, reducing the power of Vane's Boston support. In the aftermath of the election Anne Hutchinson was put on trial and eventually banished from the colony. Many of her followers seriously considered leaving after the election. At the urging of Roger Williams, some of these people, including Hutchinson, founded the settlement of Portsmouth on Aquidneck Island in the Narragansett Bay (later named Rhode Island and joined to Providence to form the Colony of Rhode Island and Providence Plantations). Vane decided to return to England. Biographer Henry Ireland argued in 1905, "Had he remained in New England, his enlightened mind and humane spirit would have held the Puritans back from the executions of witches and persecutions of other heretics which have added a dark chapter the early history of the States." Before his departure, he published A Brief Answer to a Certain Declaration, a response to Winthrop's defence of the Act of Exclusion; this act was passed after the election to restrict the immigration of people with views not conforming to the colony's religious orthodoxy.

Despite their political differences, Vane and Winthrop developed an epistolary relationship in the following years. Vane's legacy from his time in the New World includes the colonial legislation appropriating £400 for the establishment of an institute of higher learning now known as Harvard University, and his support of Roger Williams in the acquisition of Aquidneck Island from the local Indians that resulted in the formal beginnings of Rhode Island. The surviving accounts do not say that Vane provide the funds for the acquisition; Williams credits Vane as being "an instrument in the hand of God for procuring this island".

According to historian Michael Winship, Vane's experiences in Massachusetts significantly radicalized his religious views, in which he came to believe that clergy of all types, including Puritan ministers, "were the second beast of Revelations 13:11", "pretending to visible Saintship". This conviction drove his political activities in England, where he sought to minimise the power and influence of all types of clergy. Biographer Violet Rowe writes that "Vane's guiding principles in religious policy seem to have been two: a rooted distrust of clerical power, whether of bishops or presbyters, and a belief that the State should abstain from interference in church matters altogether."

Vane's stance can be seen in the way the first Rhode Island patent was drafted in 1643, when he sat on the Parliamentary committee charged with colonial affairs. Unique among all of the early English colonial charters, it contains provisions guaranteeing freedom of religion. (Vane assisted Roger Williams again in 1652, when the latter sought a confirmation of the Rhode Island charter and the revocation of a conflicting charter that had been issued to William Coddington.)

== Return to England ==
On his return to England, he procured, with the assistance of the Earl of Northumberland and his father, a position as Treasurer of the Royal Navy in 1639. In this position he had the personally distasteful yet highly profitable task of collecting the hated ship money (a tax to support the Navy imposed by Charles I without Parliamentary approval). In June 1640 he was awarded a knighthood by King Charles. He married Frances Wray, daughter of Sir Christopher Wray, on 1 July 1640, after which his father settled upon him most of the family's holdings. These included Fairlawn in Kent, and Raby Castle, where Vane would make his home. According to his biographers, the relationship with Frances was anchored by shared spiritual goals and intimacy, and was happy and fulfilling.

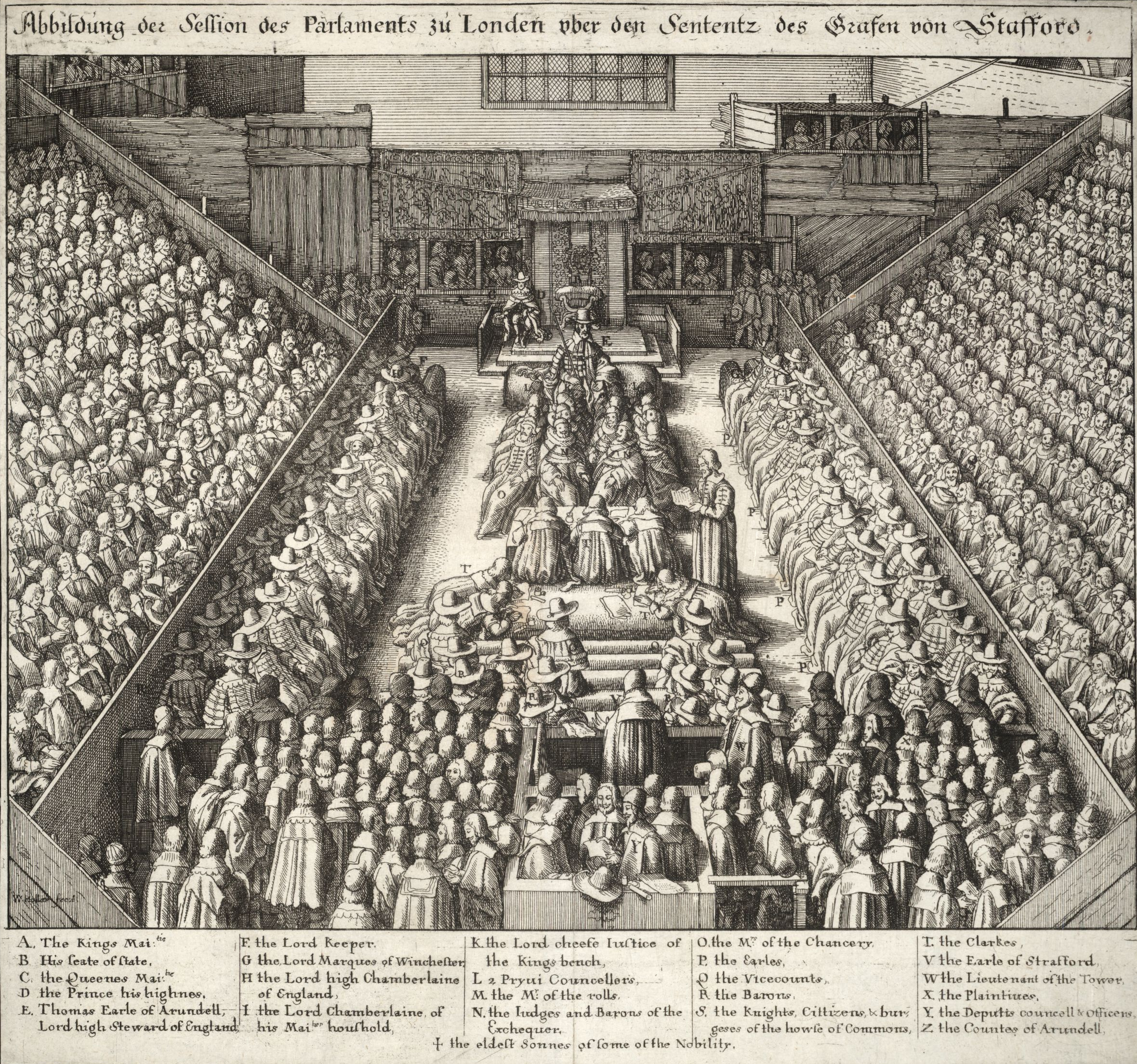
Engraving by Wenceslas Hollar depicting the trial of the Earl of Strafford

The connection with the admiralty secured for him election to the Short and Long Parliaments representing Hull. Vane had already formed or renewed associations with prominent opponents of Charles' policies, including John Pym and John Hampden. In the Short Parliament he was noted to be "capable of managing great affairs", with a "penetrating judgment" and an "easy and graceful manner of speaking." With others like Nathaniel Fiennes, he represented a younger generation of Puritans in the leadership of the Long Parliament that effectively managed affairs: as identified by Clarendon in his history, these included Hampden, Pym, and Oliver St John in the Commons, and Earl of Bedford and Viscount Saye and Sele in the Lords.

Vane was instrumental in the 1641 impeachment and execution of the Earl of Strafford, a member of the Privy Council. Vane discovered some confidential notes his father had made of a council meeting, and passed them to John Pym. The wording in those notes could be interpreted to mean that Strafford had proposed that Charles use the Irish Army to subjugate England. The evidence against Strafford was weak, and the impeachment failed. Pym consequently orchestrated the passage of a bill of attainder against Strafford, who was then executed in May 1641. The illicit means by which Pym acquired the notes caused a rift between the Vanes that healed only when the elder Vane eventually came to oppose the king.

In the Root and Branch petition debate in the Commons, from December 1640 and into 1641, Vane supported, as did Nathaniel Fiennes, the call for radical reforms in the Church of England, a position that put Vane in opposition to his father. Amid a sea of complaints about church governance, he and Fiennes in February 1641 were added to a committee that had been established the previous November to draft a report on the state of the kingdom. Their efforts led Vane to introduce the Root and Branch Bill in May 1641. The debate on the bill was acrimonious, and resulted in a clear indication of parliamentary support for church reform. In its wake mobs invaded churches, removing "scandalous images" and other signs of "popery". Vane made an impassioned speech that brought him to the front of his faction, claiming episcopacy (the governing structure of the Church of England) was a corrupt doctrine "hastening us back again to Rome." The bill died without a vote in August, when more critical matters arose to occupy Parliament. When Charles went to Scotland to rally Scottish forces to the royalist cause, the Commons began drafting what became known as the Grand Remonstrance. Many historians have claimed Vane had a role in drafting some of its language; this matter is disputed, but either way Vane did not participate in the debate. Narrowly passed by the Commons in November 1641, the document catalogued many grievances against the king and church, and served to further polarize political affairs. The king refused to enact any of the requested reforms. Upon his return from Scotland, the king also deprived both Vanes, father and son, of their administrative posts, in revenge for their roles in the execution of Strafford.

== Civil War ==
=== Early years ===
In the first six months of 1642, relations between the king and Parliament broke down completely, and factions supporting both sides took up arms. Parliament returned Vane to his post as Treasurer of the Navy, where he used connections to bring significant naval support to the Parliamentary side after Charles attempted to arrest five MPs on charges of high treason in December 1641. In June 1642, Charles rejected the Nineteen Propositions, the last substantive set of demands made by Parliament prior to the outbreak of the First English Civil War. After hostilities began that June with the siege of Hull, Vane was given a seat on the Committee of Safety, which oversaw Parliamentary military activities.

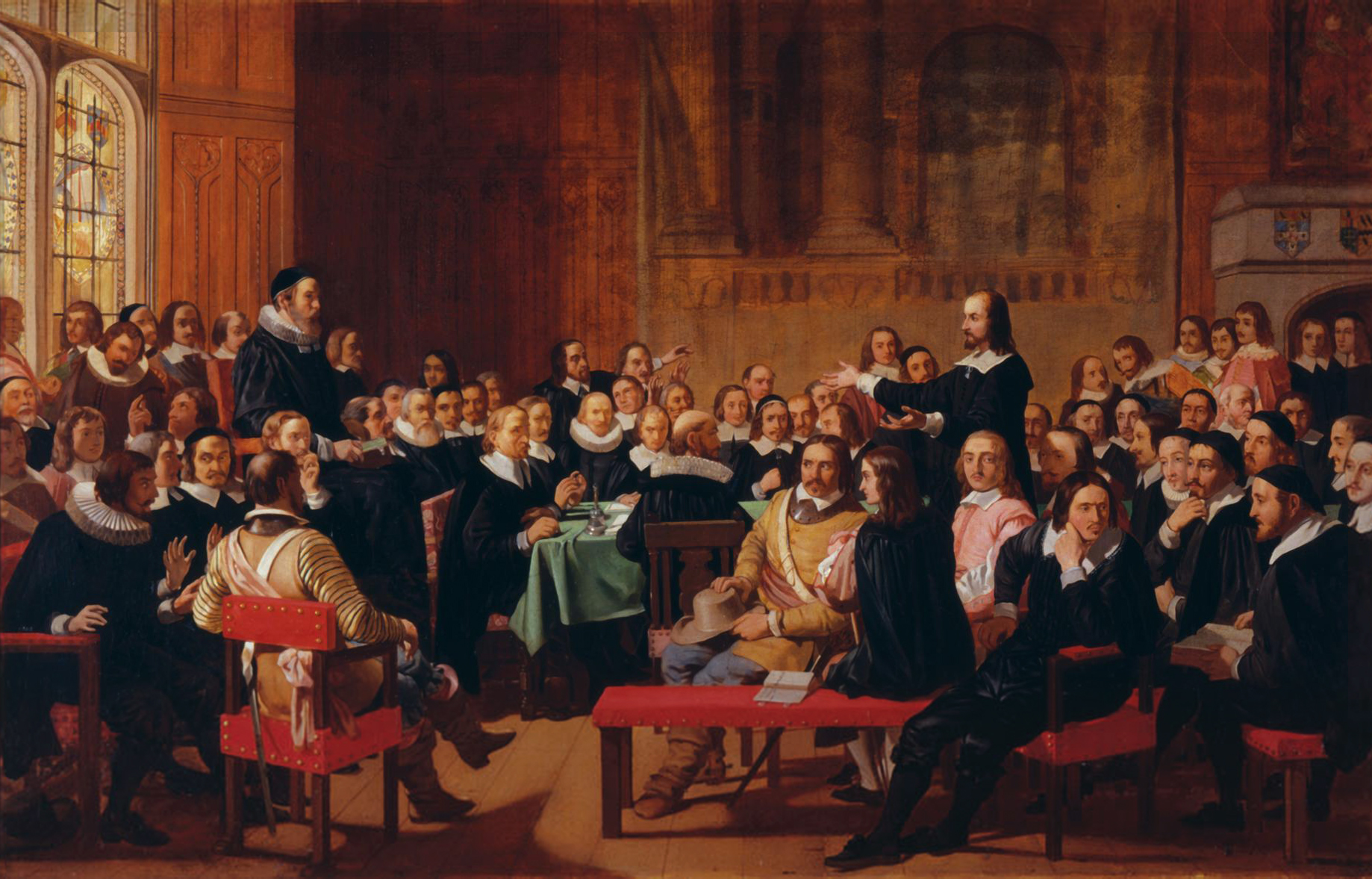
19th century depiction of the Westminster Assembly of Divines

After the failure of the Root and Branch Bill, Parliament in 1643 called together the Westminster Assembly of Divines, a body of lay politicians, lords, and clergy whose purpose was to reform church governance. Vane sat on this body, which met periodically until 1648, as one of the lay representatives of the Independent faction. Not long after its first meeting in July, Vane was sent at the head of a Parliamentary commission seeking military assistance from the Scots. The Scots, who had been opposed to Charles in the Bishop's Wars (1639–40) over religious issues, were willing to assist the English Parliament if the latter were willing to allow the extension of the Presbyterian system of church polity to England. Vane was opposed to both Presbyterianism and Episcopalianism, but found a way to finesse an agreement. He proposed that the agreement, which covered a combination of religious and political topics, be called the Solemn League and Covenant, and he introduced slippery language into the agreement concerning "the example of the best Reformed churches". This language permitted the Scots to believe that their ideas would be adopted, while the English could interpret it to mean that English (i.e. Independent) practices could be adopted. The league and covenant were eventually approved by authorities in Scotland, England, and Ireland, and paved the way for Scottish entry into the war.

Following Vane's success in negotiating the Scottish agreement, the death of John Pym at the end of 1643 propelled Vane into the leadership of Parliament, along with Oliver St John, Henry Marten, and Arthur Heselrige. He promoted, and became a chief member of, the Committee of Both Kingdoms, established in February 1644 as a point were English and Scottish authorities could coordinate war activities. Vane was then sent to York in June 1644, then besieged by three Parliament armies, to urge Sir Thomas Fairfax and the Earl of Manchester to divert some of those forces to face Prince Rupert of the Rhine, who had recently taken Liverpool and was pillaging properties of Parliamentary supporters in Lancashire. While there he also proposed to the generals the establishment of a government which would depose Charles I and crown the Prince to make him King. This idea was roundly rejected by the old guard generals who believed Charles could still be accommodated, but found support with the rising star of Oliver Cromwell.

On 13 September 1644 Vane acted with St John and Cromwell in the Commons to set up a "Grand Committee for the Accommodation", designed to find a compromise on religious issues dividing the Westminster Assembly. He sought in its debate to identify loopholes for religious tolerance on behalf of the Independents. This exposed Vane's opposition to Presbyterianism, and created a rift between the pro-war Independents, led by Vane and Cromwell, and the pro-peace Scots and other supporters of Presbyterianism. The latter included the Earl of Essex, whose failures in the west of England reduced popular support for his cause, even as the military success of Cromwell at Marston Moor raised his profile.

Robert Baillie, on the realisation that the Parliamentary Independents, despite previous claims of support by Vane, were not on the side of the Scots, wrote "Sir Henry Vane and The Solicitor [St John]... without any regard for us, who have saved their nation and brought their two persons to the height of power now they enjoy and use to our prejudice".

=== Parliamentary victory ===
Overtures for peace talks were begun in November 1644 between king and Parliament. Vane was one of many negotiators sent to Uxbridge in a failed attempt to negotiate peace. Vane and the Independents were seen by some as a principal reason for the failure of these talks, because the Scots and Charles were prepared to agree on issues of church polity and doctrine and the Independents were not. The talks, which lasted from late January through most of February 1645, were overshadowed by the execution after impeachment by attainder of Archbishop Laud. Parliament began discussing a reorganisation of its military as early as November 1644, in part to remove some poorly-performing commanders, and to eliminate the regional character of the existing forces. In debate that principally divided the Commons from the Lords, Vane and Cromwell supported passage of the Self-denying Ordinance, forbidding military officers from serving in Parliament, and the establishment of the New Model Army, which would be capable of fighting anywhere in the country. The provisions of the Self-denying Ordinance also extended to individuals (like Vane) who held civil service posts, but included exceptions for those (like Vane) who had been turned out office by Charles and restored by Parliament.

Following the decisive Parliamentary victory at Naseby in June 1645, the first phase of the civil war was effectively over, but it dragged on for another year, before Charles surrendered to Scottish army commanders.

In January 1646, amid ongoing peace negotiations, Charles attempted to separate the Independents from other factions by proposing in letters to Vane an alliance with his faction against the Presbyterians. Vane was not amused by this, and responded by pointing out that he preferred the rights of "tender consciences" to be granted by Parliament rather than by the duplicitous king (papers exposing the king's negotiating positions as facades had been captured at Naseby, and had largely silenced the Royalist elements in Parliament).

Beginning in the summer of 1645, Raby Castle was ravaged by Scots royalists. In September 1645, the Vanes succeeded in getting Parliamentary approval to fortify Raby. During the war, Vane's father reported that Raby Castle had been "visited four times", suffering damages of £16,000. Vane withheld the return of treasury fees beginning in 1645 for two and half years until the same £16,000 suffered at Raby accumulated.

=== Interwar politics ===
Vane supported Oliver Cromwell during the Civil War, but fell out with him later.

By the end of the war the Presbyterian group in the Commons, led by Denzil Holles, William Strode, and Sir Philip Stapleton, was slightly stronger than the Independents. They proceeded to introduce legislation hostile to the views on religious tolerance held by Vane and Independents in the army. Vane apparently came to realise that the Presbyterian actions posed a threat equal to that of the Episcopalians, and that military action, having sidelined the latter, might also work against the former. The Independents attempted to negotiate terms favourable to them with Charles, but these were unsuccessful.

In 1647 Vane and Oliver Cromwell, the leader of the army's Independents, came to work closely together. The Presbyterian majority sought to disband the army to reduce the threat of those Independents, but issues over pay (which was in arrears), widows' pensions, and other grievances, prompted the Presbyterians to enter into negotiations with the army. Cromwell was eventually able to appease the army, but a Parliamentary purge of Independent officers followed, and the army was ordered to disband. Some Parliamentary leaders also began negotiating with the Scots for the return of their army, this time to oppose the English army.

The Parliament army mutinied, and under Cromwell's orders (possibly prompted by a warning from Vane) a detachment of troops seized Charles, who had been placed under a comfortable house arrest at Holmby. This forced the Presbyterian leadership to meet the army's demands for pay. They also established a commission to treat with the army, on which they placed Vane, presumably because of his influence with the military.

The negotiations between the army and Parliament were acrimonious. Mobs in Presbyterian-dominated London threatened Vane and other Independents. More than 50 Independent MPs, Vane among them, fled the city on 2 August for the protection of the army. The army then marched on London, with Vane and others at its head, and the Independents were again seated in Parliament. The Parliament then debated the army's Heads of Proposals for fixing the term and powers of Parliament and church governance. Key among its terms of interest to Vane was one that effectively stripped the church, either Episcopal or Presbyterian, of any coercive powers. The Heads of Proposals was also sent to Charles, who indicated agreement to some of its terms and opposition to others, and proposed further negotiations.

The king's proposal split the Independents between those, such as Vane and Cromwell, who were willing to negotiate with the king, and those who were not. Reverend Hugh Peter spoke out in favour of the "non-addresses" (i.e. no longer negotiating with the king). In November 1647, while the debate continued, Charles escaped his confinement at Hampton Court and made his way to the Isle of Wight. There he was recaptured and imprisoned in Carisbrook Castle. Offered proposals by the Scots and the Independents, he chose alliance with the Scots. Sectional violence between royalists, Presbyterians, and Independents, spread throughout the country, although the army maintained a tenuous peace in London.

=== War renewed ===
Violence flared throughout the country as the various factions armed and organised. A mutiny in the Royal Navy in May thrust Vane into attempts to prevent it from spreading, and to regain the support of the mutineers, who had declared for Charles. By mid-July, the army had regained control of most of England, and Cromwell defeated the Scottish army in August at the Battle of Preston. In the tumult, Vane appeared at times to be in opposition to some of the Independent factions, even having a falling out (quickly healed) with Cromwell, and many factions came to distrust him. Despite this he was one of the Parliamentary representatives for negotiations with Charles at Newport in September 1648. He was widely blamed for the failure of those negotiations over his insistence on "an unbounded liberty of conscience".

VANE, young in years, but in sage counsel old,
Than whom a better senator ne’er held
The helm of Rome, when gowns, not arms, repelled
The fierce Epirot and the African bold,
Whether to settle peace, or to unfold
The drift of hollow states hard to be spelled;
Then to advise how war may best, upheld,
Move by her two main nerves, iron and gold,
In all her equipage; besides, to know;
Both spiritual power and civil, what each means,
What severs each, thou hast learned, which few have done.
The bounds of either sword to thee we owe:
Therefore on thy firm hand Religion leans
In peace, and reckons thee her eldest son.

— John Milton

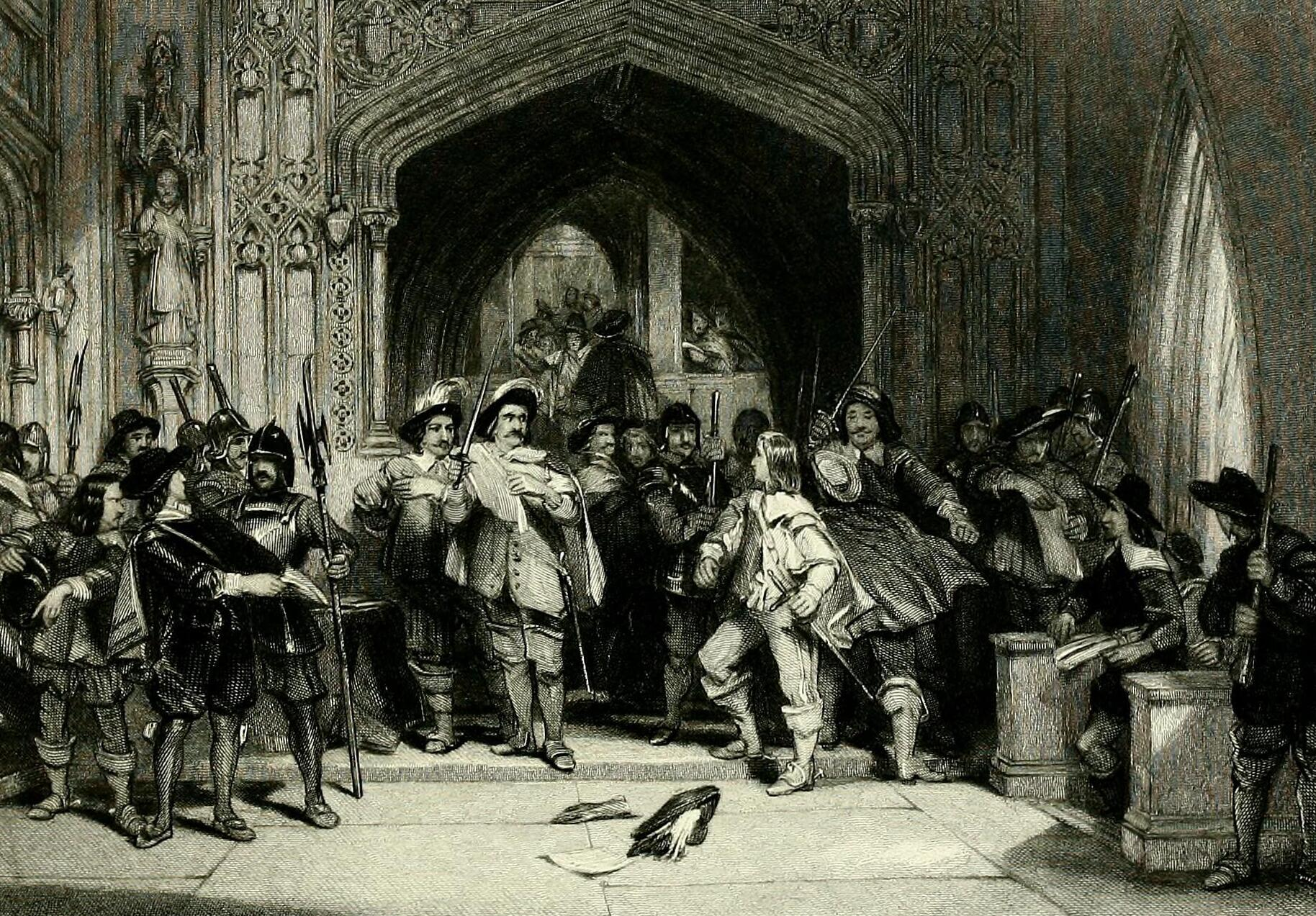
Colonel Pride refusing admission to the Presbyterian members of the Long Parliament

In the debates of late 1648 concerning the king's fate, Vane argued that the Parliament should constitute a government without the king "to make themselves the happiest nation and people in the world." His forceful speech on 2 December suggesting that the king would need to be eliminated as a political force was opposed by others, including Nathaniel Fiennes, who claimed that the concessions the king had made to date were sufficient that an agreement might be reached. Others suggested that rather than dividing the house by opposition to the king, it be divided by separating those who had gained in the war from those who had not, and that financial contributions be made from one group to the other. After an impassioned conciliatory speech by William Prynne, Parliament finally voted on 5 December that the king's concessions were sufficient.

On 6 December, the military stepped in to take control of matters. Troops led by Thomas Pride surrounded the Houses of Parliament, and systematically arrested arriving MPs who had been supportive of negotiation with the king. Vane did not appear that day; either he was aware of what was going to happen, or he may have stayed away because his side had lost the vote. This action, known as "Pride's Purge", resulted in the exclusion of more than 140 MPs.

The Parliament that sat became known as the Rump Parliament, and its first main order of business was the trial and execution of King Charles. During this process Vane refused to attend Parliament, although he was present as a spectator when the trial began on 20 January 1649. He later claimed to oppose putting the king on trial because of "tenderness of blood", and continued to fulfil the duties of his government posts, signing admiralty papers on the day Charles was executed.

== The Commonwealth and Oliver Cromwell ==
After the execution of Charles, the House of Commons voted to abolish both the crown and the House of Lords. To replace the executive functions of the crown, it established a Council of State to which Vane was appointed. He refused to be seated until he could do so without taking any oath, in particular the first one, which required an expression of approval for the regicide. Vane served on many of the council's committees. On 1 August 1650 he was named president of the first Commission of Trade established by an Act of Parliament. The commission's instructions were to consider, both domestic and foreign trade, the trading companies, manufactures, free ports, customs, excise, statistics, coinage and exchange, and fisheries, but also the plantations and the best means of promoting their welfare and rendering them useful to England. This act's statesmanlike and comprehensive instructions, along with an October act prohibiting trade with pro-royalist colonies and the first Navigation Act of the following year, formed the first definitive expression of England's commercial policy.

In his role on committees overseeing the military he directed the provisioning of supplies for Cromwell's conquest of Ireland. As a leading member of the committee overseeing the navy (where he was joined by schoolmate Thomas Scot), he directed affairs in the naval First Anglo-Dutch War (1652–1654). Milton addressed an admiring sonnet to him in summer 1652. After the navy's disastrous performance against the Dutch in 1652, Vane headed the committee that reformed the navy, drafting new Articles of War and formally codifying naval law. Vane's reforms were instrumental in the navy's successes later in the war. He was also involved in foreign diplomacy, going on a mission to France (whose purpose is unknown) in 1652 to meet with Cardinal de Retz, and travelling again to Scotland to organise the government there after Cromwell's victories in the Third English Civil War.

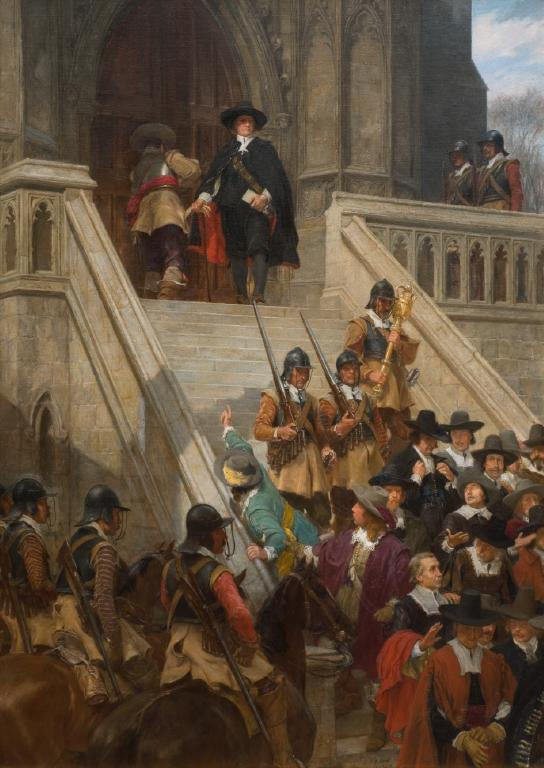
Cromwell dissolving Parliament on 20 April 1653

Vane was also active in domestic affairs. He sat on a committee that disposed of Charles I's art collection, and made many enemies in his role on the committees for Compounding and Sequestration. These committees, on which Vane had also sat in the 1640s, were responsible for the distribution of assets seized from royalists and other government opponents, and for negotiating with those who had failed to pay taxes and other government charges. Some of the enemies he made while engaged in this work would one day sit in judgment against him.

The process by which the Parliament carried out the duties of the executive was cumbersome, and this became an issue with Cromwell and the army, who sought the ability to act more decisively. This attitude drove a wedge between Cromwell and Vane. Under pressure from Cromwell for new elections, the Parliament began to consider proposals for electoral reform. In January 1653 a committee headed by Vane made one such proposal. It called for suffrage to be allowed on the basis of property ownership, and it sought specifically to eliminate some so-called "rotten boroughs", which had small numbers of voters and were controlled by wealthy patrons. The proposal also called for some of the current members, whose republican credentials were deemed suitable, to retain their seats, so that the fledgling commonwealth might, as Harry Marten put it, be shepherded by "the mother that brought it forth". This latter clause was proposed specifically at the urging of the army by Vane, who realised that those who were charged with its implementation would be able to retain power. However, Cromwell, seeking a general election, was opposed to this scheme, and the two sides were unable to reconcile.

Although Parliamentary leaders, Vane among them, had promised Cromwell on 19 April 1653 to delay action on the election bill, Vane was likely one of the ringleaders who sought to have the bill enacted the next day before Cromwell could react. Cromwell was however alerted by a supporter, and interrupted the proceedings that would otherwise have passed the bill. Bringing troops into the chamber, he put an end to the debate, saying "You are no Parliament. I say you are no Parliament. I will put an end to your sitting." Vane protested, "This is not honest; yea, it is against morality and common honesty", to which Cromwell shouted in response, "O Sir Henry Vane, Sir Henry Vane; the Lord deliver me from Sir Henry Vane!" This ended the commonwealth, and Cromwell began to rule as Lord Protector. Vane, "daily missed and courted for his assistance", was invited to sit on Cromwell's council, but refused.

Effectively in retirement, Vane wrote the Retired Man's Meditations, published in 1655, this work, a jargon-laden religious treatise in which Vane wanders between literal and symbolic interpretation of Biblical scriptures, was treated by contemporaries and later analysts, including David Hume, as "absolutely unintelligible" and "cloudily formed". The same year, after Cromwell called for a fast day to consider methods by which his government might be improved, Vane wrote A Healing Question. In this more carefully structured political work, he proposed a new form of government based on a constitution decided by men attending a constitutional convention. He was encouraged to publish it by Charles Fleetwood, who had shown it to Cromwell. In a postscript to the work Vane wrote the words "the good old cause", a coinage that became a rallying cry in the next few years for Vane's group of republicans.

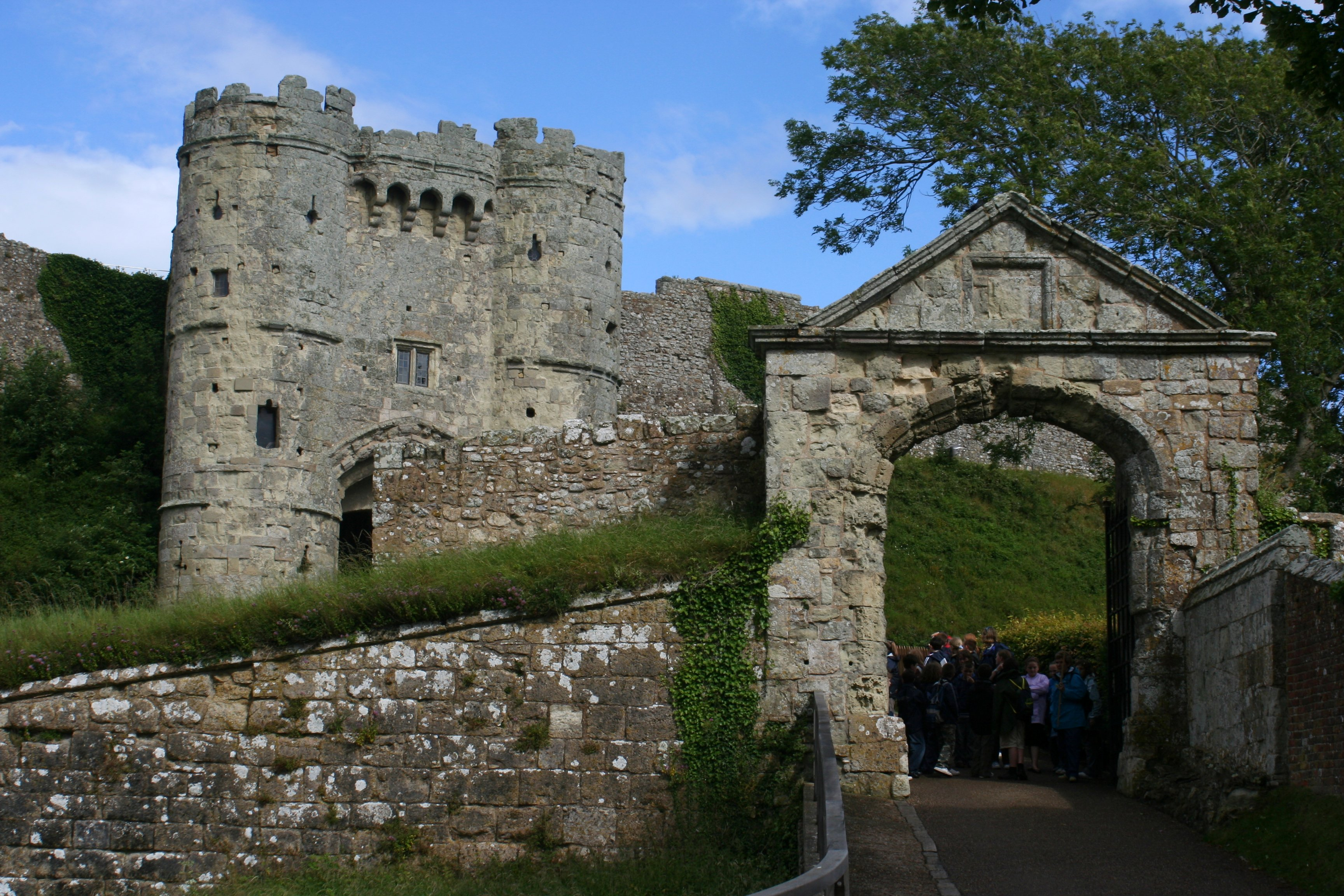
The gate to Carisbrook Castle, where Vane was imprisoned in 1656

A Healing Question was seen by John Thurloe, Cromwell's Secretary of State, as a thinly veiled attack on Cromwell, and its publication prompted a number of opposition political groups to step up their activities. Rumours circulated that protests raised by fringe religious groups like the Anabaptists and Quakers were due to Vane's involvement, prompting Cromwell's council to issue an order on 29 July 1656, summoning Vane to appear. Vane was ordered to post a bond of £5,000 "to do nothing to the prejudice of the present government and the peace of the Commonwealth", but refused. He was arrested shortly afterward and imprisoned in Carisbrooke Castle. While there he addressed a letter to Cromwell in which he repudiated the extra-parliamentary authority Cromwell had assumed. Vane was released, still unrepentant, on 31 December 1656.

During Vane's retirement he established a religious teaching group, which resulted in a group of admirers known as "Vanists". He also cultivated pamphleteers and other surrogates to promote his political views. Henry Stubbe, introduced to Vane by Westminster head Richard Busby, became a supporter, and defended him in his Essay in Defence of the Good Old Cause, and in Malice Rebuked (1659).

== Richard Cromwell and after ==
Following Oliver Cromwell's death in September 1658, his son Richard succeeded him as Lord Protector. The younger Cromwell lacked the political and military skills of his father, and the political factionalism of the earlier Commonwealth began to resurface. When elections were called for a new parliament in December 1658, Cromwell attempted to prevent the election of both royalists and republicans. Vane, as a leader of the republican faction, was specifically targeted, but managed to win election representing Whitchurch. In the parliament's session, the republicans questioned Cromwell's claim to power, argued in favour of limiting it, and spoke against the veto power of the Cromwellian House of Lords, which was packed with supporters of the protector. The republicans were unsuccessful in enacting any substantive changes.

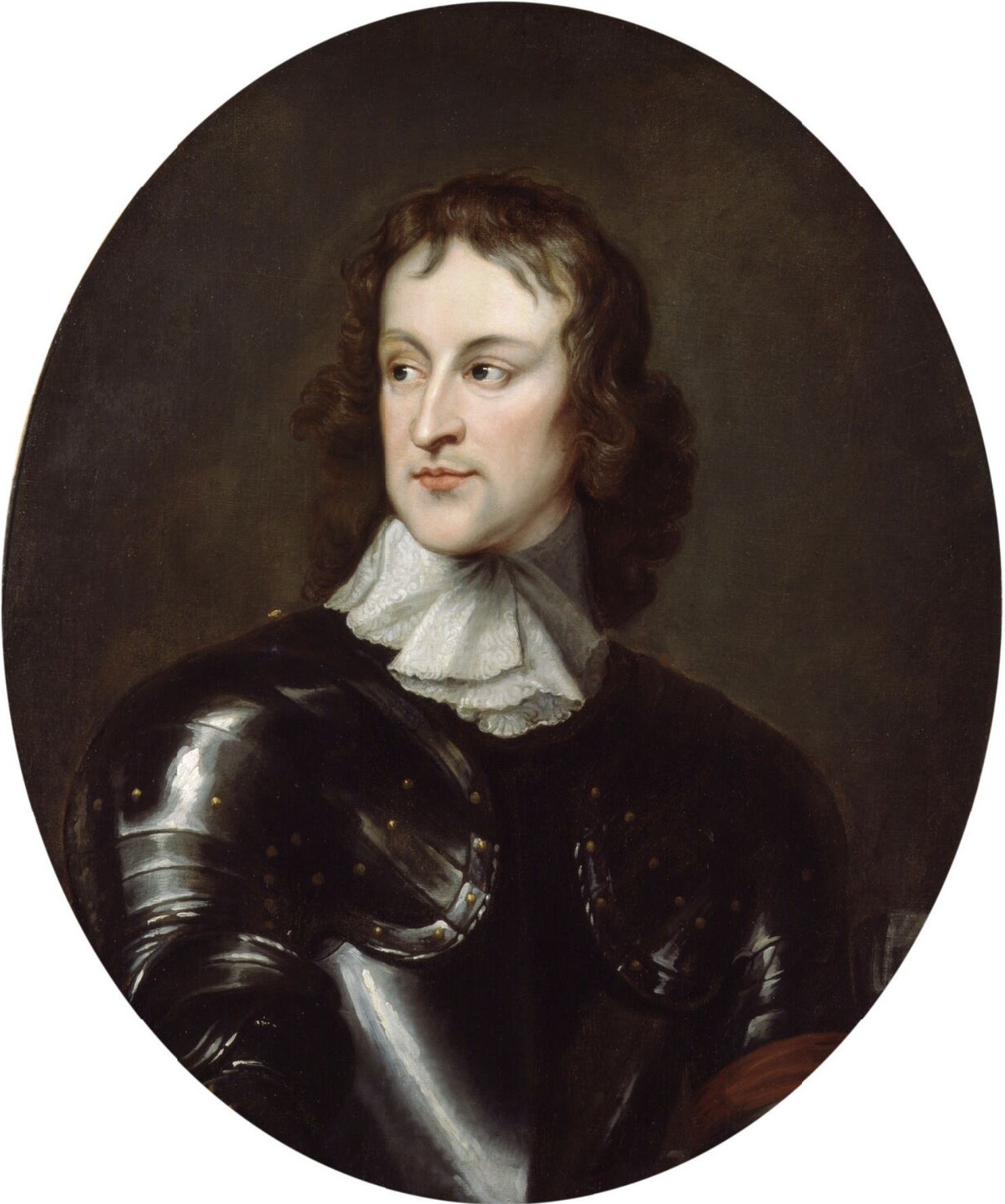
General John Lambert

Vane formed an alliance with a group of republican military officers known as the Wallingford House party, who met secretly in violation of laws enacted to limit military participation in political matters. The Cromwellian factions in the parliament overreached in their attempts to control republican sentiment in the military, and Cromwell was forced to dissolve the parliament in April 1659. Cromwell, with little support in the military, abdicated several days later. Following a purge of pro-Cromwell supporters from the military and a widespread pamphleteering campaign, Cromwell's council recalled the Rump Parliament in May.

In the reconstituted Rump Parliament, Vane was appointed to the new council of state. He also served as commissioner for the appointment of army officers, managed foreign affairs, and examined the state of the government's finances, which were found to be in dismal condition. Through his work General John Lambert was sent to quell Booth's Rebellion, a royalist uprising in August 1659. Lambert's support of non-mainstream religious views like Quakerism, however, ensured his political downfall. After he and other officers were stripped of their command by Parliament in October, they rallied their troops and marched on Parliament, forcibly dissolving it. A committee of safety was formed, composed of the army grandees, and including Vane and Sir Bulstrode Whitelocke. He agreed to serve in part because he feared the republican cause was destined to fail without army support. This committee served only until December, but Vane played a vital role in trying to stop Vice Admiral Lawson from blockading London with some twenty-two ships. He negotiated with Lawson and when he couldn't stop the planned blockade, he informed the Committee of Safety. When the advance of General George Monck's army from Scotland led to the melting away of Lambert's military support, General Charles Fleetwood was forced to turn over the keys to Parliament House to the Speaker which led to the restoration of the full Long Parliament. For taking part in the committee of safety, Vane was expelled (over vocal objections from allies like Heselrige) from the Commons, and ordered into house arrest at Raby Castle. He went to Raby in February 1660, but stayed there only briefly and eventually returned to his house at Hampstead.

That knave in grain
Sir Harry Vane
His case than most men's is sadder
There is little hope
He can [e]scape the rope
For the Rump turned him o'er the ladder.

— Anonymous pamphleteer

During the tumultuous year of the late 1650s proposals for how the government should be structured and how powers should be balanced were widely debated, in private, in public debates in Parliament, and through the publication of pamphlets. Vane used all of these methods to promote his ideas. In 1660 he published A Needful Corrective or Balance in Popular Government. This open letter was essentially a response to James Harrington's The Commonwealth of Oceana, a 1656 treatise describing Harrington's view of a utopian government, which included limitations on property ownership and a legislature with an elected upper chamber. Harrington's thesis was that power arose from property ownership, and concentrated land ownership led to oligarchic and monarchic forms of government. Vane disagreed with this, arguing instead that power came from godliness, and presented a somewhat apocalyptic argument in support of his idea. Vane supporter Henry Stubbe stated openly in October 1659 that permanent Senators would be required. These proposals caused a terminal split in Vane's alliance with Heselrige, whose followers mostly deserted Vane.

== The Restoration ==
In March 1660 the Long Parliament finally dissolved itself, and elections were held for the Convention Parliament, which sat in May. This body, dominated by royalists and Presbyterians, formally proclaimed Charles II as king, and he was restored to the throne on 29 May 1660. In order to minimise acts of reprisal and vengeance for acts taken during the Interregnum, the parliament passed the Indemnity and Oblivion Act, under whose terms most actions were forgiven. Specific exceptions were made for those directly involved in the regicide. Although Vane did not support the regicide and would not take an oath of support for it afterwards, he was also, after long debate, named as an exception. The act was not passed until August 1660, and Vane was arrested on 1 July 1660 on the orders of the king and imprisoned in the Tower of London. The parliament, after passing the Indemnity Act, petitioned Charles to grant clemency to Vane and others, asking that his life might be spared. This petition was granted.

Despite the clemency, Vane remained in the Tower, and the income from his estates was seized. He suffered the privations of the prison, and was unable to discharge debts that ran to £10,000. He was transferred to the Isles of Scilly in October 1661 in order to limit access to him by potential conspirators who might be scheming to free him. He continued to write, principally on religious themes, seeking to come to terms with the political state of affairs and his condition. According to The People's Case Stated, written by Vane in this time, power originated with God, but resided primarily with the people: "The power which is directive, and states and ascertains the morality of the rule of obedience, is in the hand of God; but the original, from whence all just power arises, which is magistratical and co-ercitive, is from the will or free gift of the people, who may either keep the power in themselves or give up their subjection and will in the hand of another." King and people were bound by "the fundamental constitution or compact", which if the king violated, the people might return to their original right and freedom.

Following Vane's move to Scilly, the Cavalier Parliament passed a resolution in November 1661 demanding his return to the Tower for trial. Charles temporized, and in January 1662 the Parliament renewed the demand. Vane was moved back to the Tower in April 1662, and on 2 June 1662 he was arraigned on charges of high treason against Charles II. The trial began on 6 June before the Court of King's Bench, with four judges headed by Lord Chief Justice Robert Foster presiding, and with the king's attorney general Sir Geoffrey Palmer prosecuting. As was typical of those accused of treason, Vane was denied legal representation. He defended himself against charges of making war against the king during the civil war by asserting the sovereign power of parliament. Accused of imagining the death of the king in 1659, he argued that it was not possible to commit treason against a king not in possession of the crown. When the prosecution argued that the king was always in de jure possession, Vane pointed out that this rendered invalid the charges that he conspired to keep Charles II from exercising his power. The judges stepped in to point out this was irrelevant. The jury, which was packed with royalists, convicted him after thirty minutes of debate.

Vane attempted to appeal his conviction, and tried to get the magistrates to sign a Bill of Exclusion in which Vane catalogued all the problems he saw with his trial. However, the magistrates refused. Informed of Vane's conduct before and during the trial, Charles II now felt that Vane was too dangerous a man to be left alive, and retracted his clemency. (Unlike Vane, John Lambert at his trial had thrown himself to the mercy of the court, and was consequently exiled to Guernsey after his conviction.) Although Vane had been sentenced to the commoner's death of being hanged and then drawn and quartered, Charles was persuaded to grant him the gentleman's death of beheading. On 14 June 1662 Vane was taken to Tower Hill and beheaded. Noted diarist Samuel Pepys was there and recorded the event:

He made a long speech, many times interrupted by the Sheriff and others there; and they would have taken his paper out of his hand, but he would not let it go. But they caused all the books of those that writ after him to be given the Sheriff; and the trumpets were brought under the scaffold that he might not be heard. Then he prayed, and so fitted himself, and received the blow; but the scaffold was so crowded that we could not see it done....He had a blister, or issue, upon his neck, which he desired them not hurt: he changed not his colour or speech to the last, but died justifying himself and the cause he had stood for; and spoke very confidently of his being presently at the right hand of Christ; and in all things appeared the most resolved man that ever died in that manner, and showed more of heat than cowardize, but yet with all humility and gravity. One asked him why he did not pray for the King. He answered, "Nay," says he, "you shall see I can pray for the King: I pray God bless him!"

In his final days Vane had made his peace with God, and had also carefully prepared the speech he intended to make at the execution. In order to preserve the speech, he gave copies to close friends who visited him in those days, which were later printed. Many viewed him as a martyr for continuing to espouse his cause, and some thought the king had lost more than he gained by having him executed. His body was returned to his family, who interred him in the church at Shipbourne, near the family estate of Fairlawn in Kent.

== Family ==
Vane and his wife Frances had ten children. Of their five sons, only the last, Christopher, had children, and succeeded to his father's estates. He was created Baron Barnard by William III.

== Works ==
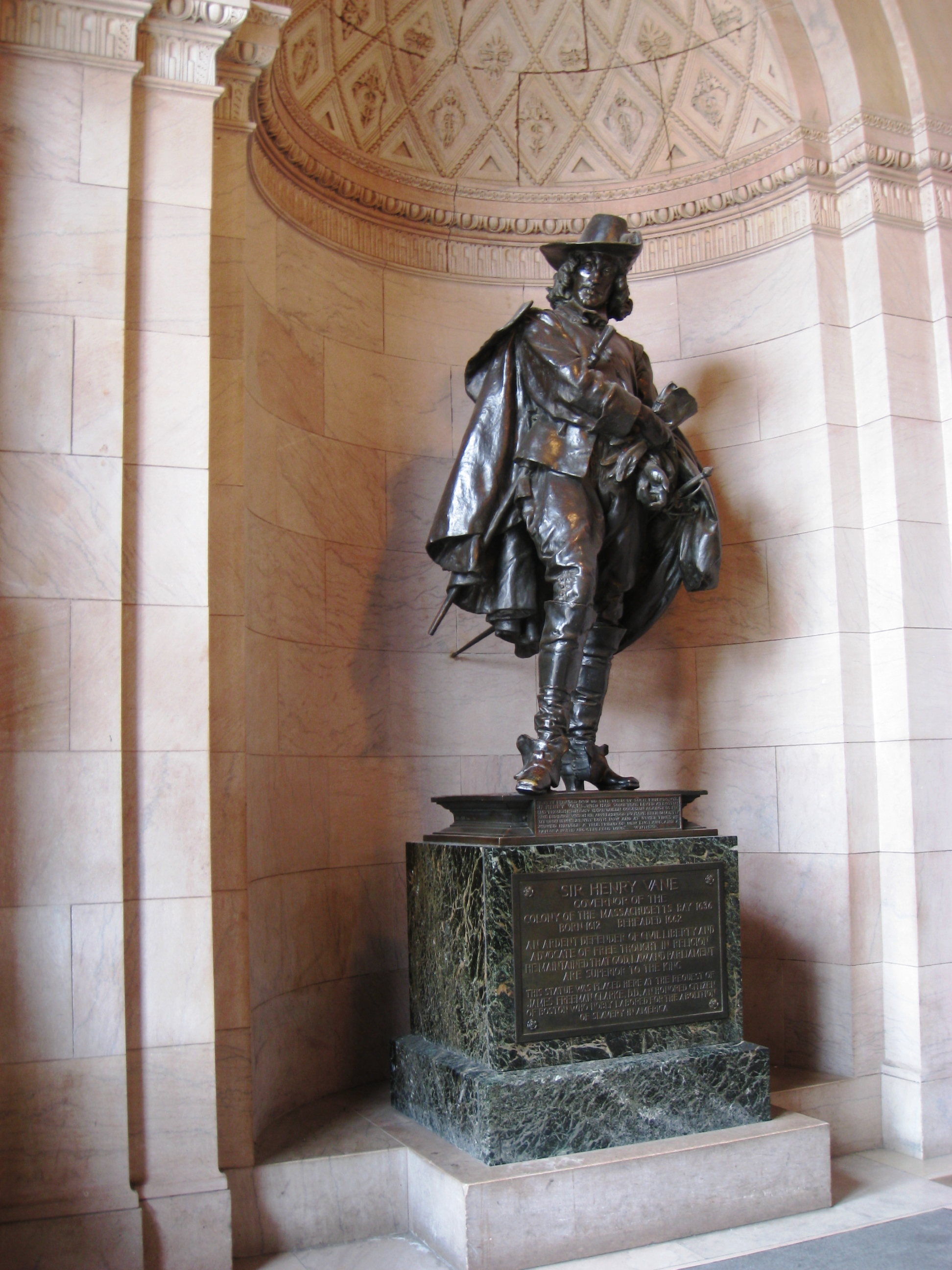
Statue in Boston Public Library

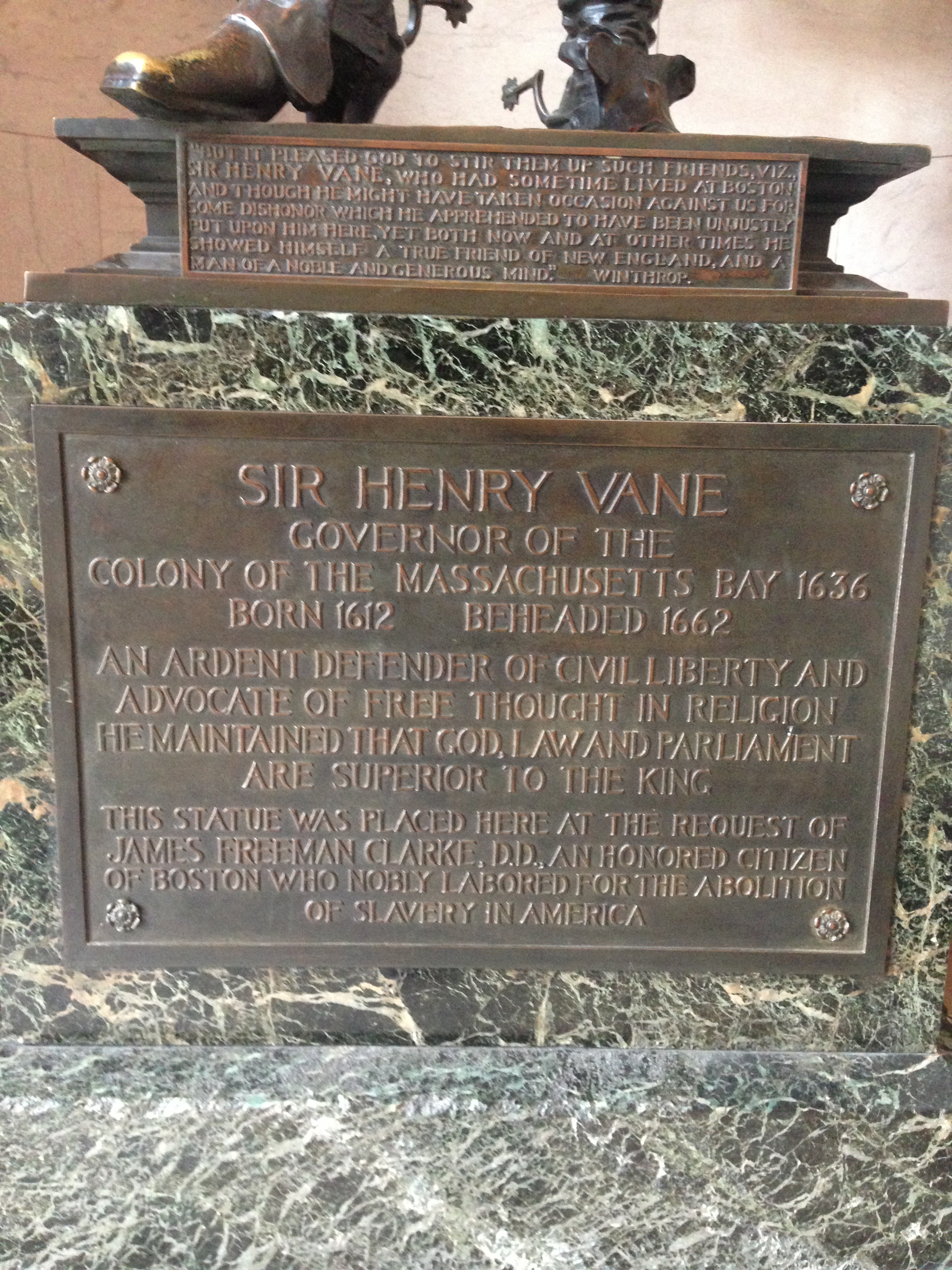
Marker under the statue

A number of Vane's speeches to Parliament and other bodies were printed during his lifetime or shortly after, including The Speech Intended to Have been Spoken on the Scaffold, published in 1662.

Vane's other printed works include:

- A Brief Answer to a Certain Declaration, 1637
- The Retired Man's Meditations, 1655
- A Healing Question Propounded, 1656
- Of Love of God and Union with God, 1657?
- The Proceeds of the Protector ... Against Sir Henry Vane, Knight, 1658
- A Needful Corrective or Balance in Popular Government, 1659
- Two Treatises: "Epistle General to the Mystical Body of Christ" and "The Face of the Times", 1662
- The Cause of the People of England Stated, 1689 (written 1660–1662; the title may have been intended to be "Case" instead of "Cause")
- A Pilgrimage into the Land of Promise, 1664
- The Trial of Sir Henry Vane, Knight, 1662

The last work contains, in addition to his last speech and details relating to the trial, The People's Case Stated, The Valley of Jehoshaphat, and Meditations concerning Man's Life.

Some contemporary works were incorrectly attributed to him. Clarendon, in his History of the Rebellion, assigns to Vane credit for one speech in support of the Self-Denying Ordinance; later historians find this attribution spurious. The Speech against Richard Cromwell is probably the composition of a later writer, while The Light Shining out of Darkness may have been written by Henry Stubbe.

== Reputation ==
Vane was widely recognized by contemporary chroniclers as a gifted administrator and a forceful orator. Even the royalist Clarendon had good words for him, and wrote of him as follows: "He had an unusual aspect, which ... made men think there was something in him of the extraordinary; and his whole life made good that imagination." Also, Clarendon credited Vane with having possessed "extraordinary parts, a pleasant wit, a great understanding, a temper not to be moved", and in debate "a quick conception and a very sharp and weighty expression". The 1662 biography The Life and Death of Sir Henry Vane the Younger by Vane's chaplain George Sikes included John Milton's "Sonnet 17", written in 1652 in praise of Vane, and presented to Vane that year.

He championed the cause of separation of church and state working with Governor Roger Williams of Rhode Island. He ensured the passage of Rhode Island's patent as a powerful MP in a Parliament committee overseeing the colonies. Rhode Island was the first American colony to guarantee freedom of religion based on separation of church and state in this first governing document.

Although his personal religious beliefs as noted in a few of his writings from prison were sometimes baffling, by readers as varied as Richard Baxter, Clarendon, Gilbert Burnet and David Hume. Biographer David Parnham writes "He presented himself as a 'witness' of light, as a spiritualist, as one dispensing advanced wisdoms in the epistemological setting of an imminent and apocalyptic age of the Spirit". Nevertheless, his religious beliefs weren't why he fought in Parliament nor why the King had him executed. He fought as an Independent in Parliament not aligned to any religious sect.

Vane's reputation was at its height in the nineteenth century, especially in the United States. English historian John Andrew Doyle wrote of Vane that he had acquired "a more dazzling reputation than has been granted to the lofty public spirit and statesmanlike foresight of Winthrop." William Wordsworth referenced Vane in his sonnet Great Men Have Been Among Us (1802). Charles Dickens included the exchange between Vane and Cromwell at the end of the Rump Parliament in his A Child's History of England, part-published in the early 1850s. In English Traits (1856), Ralph Waldo Emerson placed Vane on a list of historical English greats.

In April 1889, the Atlantic magazine published an article which stated. "WITH the single exception of Cromwell, the greatest statesman of the heroic age of Puritanism was unquestionably the younger Henry Vane. He did as much as any one to compass the downfall of Strafford; he brought the military strength of Scotland to the aid of the hard-pressed Parliament; he administered the navy with which Blake won his astonishing victories; he dared even withstand Cromwell at the height of his power, when his measures savored too much of violence...Yet before the beginning of his brilliant career in England, this young man had written his name indelibly upon one of the earliest pages in the history of the American people. It is pleasant to remember that this admirable man was once the chief magistrate of an American commonwealth. Thorough republican and enthusiastic lover of liberty, he was spiritually akin to Jefferson and to Samuel Adams...In his mind were the rudiments of the idea of a written constitution, upon which a new government for England might be built, with powers neatly defined and limited. One fancies that in some respects he would have felt himself more at home if he could have been suddenly translated from the Rump Parliament of 1653 to the Federal Convention of 1787, in which immortal assembly there sat perhaps no man of loftier spirit than his...He died on Tower Hill, with all the fearlessness and sweetness that had always marked his life. His memory is a precious possession for all coming generations."

In 1897 the Royal Society of the Arts marked Vane's demolished Hampstead house on Rosslyn Hill, Vane House, with a blue plaque.

A statue to honour Vane by Frederick William MacMonnies was erected in the Boston Public Library. The plaque underneath states, "This statue was placed here at the request of James Freeman Clarke, D.D. an honoured citizen of Boston who nobly labored for the abolition of slavery in America. Vane was "An Ardent Defender of Civil Liberty and Free Thought in Religion. He maintained that God and Parliament were superior to the King."

James Kendall Hosmer, editing Winthrop's Journal in 1908, wrote of Vane:

... his heroic life and death, his services to Anglo-Saxon freedom, which make him a significant figure even to the present moment, may well be regarded as the most illustrious character who touches early New England history. While his personal contact with America was only for a brief space, his life became a strenuous upholding of American ideas: if government of, by, and for the people is the principle which English-speaking men feel especially bound to maintain, the life and death of Vane contributed powerfully to cause this idea to prevail.

Wendell Phillips, a prominent American abolitionist, friend of Frederick Douglas, and advocate for Native Americans, said, "Sir Harry Vane, in my judgment the noblest human being who ever walked the streets of yonder city,--I do not forget Franklin or Sam Adams, Washington or Fayette, Garrison or John Brown, -but Vane dwells an arrow's flight above them all, and his touch consecrated the continent to measureless toleration of opinion and entire equality of rights. We are told we can find in Plato “all the intellectual life of Europe for two thousand years;” so you can find in Vane the pure gold of two hundred and fifty years of American civilization, with no particle of its dross. Plato would have welcomed him to the Academy, and Fenelon kneeled with him at the altar. He made Somers and John Marshall possible; like Carnot, he organized victory; and Milton pales before him in the stainlessness of his record. He stands among English statesmen preeminently the representative, in practice and in theory, of serene faith in the safety of trusting truth wholly to her own defence. For other men we walk backward, and throw over their memories the mantle of charity and excuse, saying reverently, “Remember the temptation and the age.” But Vane's ermine has no stain; no act of his needs explanation or apology; and in thought he stands abreast of our age,--like pure intellect, belongs to all time."
