= Sir William Russell, 4th Baronet =

Anglo-Irish politician (c. 1654–1709)

Sir William Russell, 4th Baronet (c.1654 – September 1709) was an Anglo-Irish politician.

Russell was the son of Sir John Russell, 3rd Baronet and Frances Cromwell, the youngest daughter of Oliver Cromwell. Between 1692 and 1693, he was a Member of Parliament for Carlow in the Irish House of Commons. In March 1669, he succeeded to his father's baronetcy.

He married Catherine Gore, and upon his death, Russell was succeeded by their eldest son, William.

Parliament of Ireland
Preceded by Mark Baggot; John Warren	Member of Parliament for Carlow; 1692–1693; With: Walter Weldon	Succeeded by Edmond Jones; Robert Curtis
Baronetage of England
Preceded by John Russell	Baronet (of Chippenham); 1669–1709	Succeeded by William Russell
