= John Gauden =

17th-century English Anglican cleric (died 1662)

- Bishop of Worcester
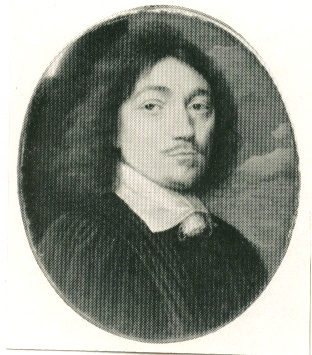
- Miniature of Gauden by John Hoskins, 1655
- Diocese: Diocese of Worcester
- In office: 10 June – 20 September 1662 (d.)
- Predecessor: George Morley
- Successor: John Earle
- Other post: Bishop of Exeter (1660–1662)

Orders
- Consecration: 2 December 1660 by Accepted Frewen

Personal details
- Born: Mayland, Essex, England
- Died: 20 September 1662
- Denomination: Anglican
- Education: St John's College, Cambridge

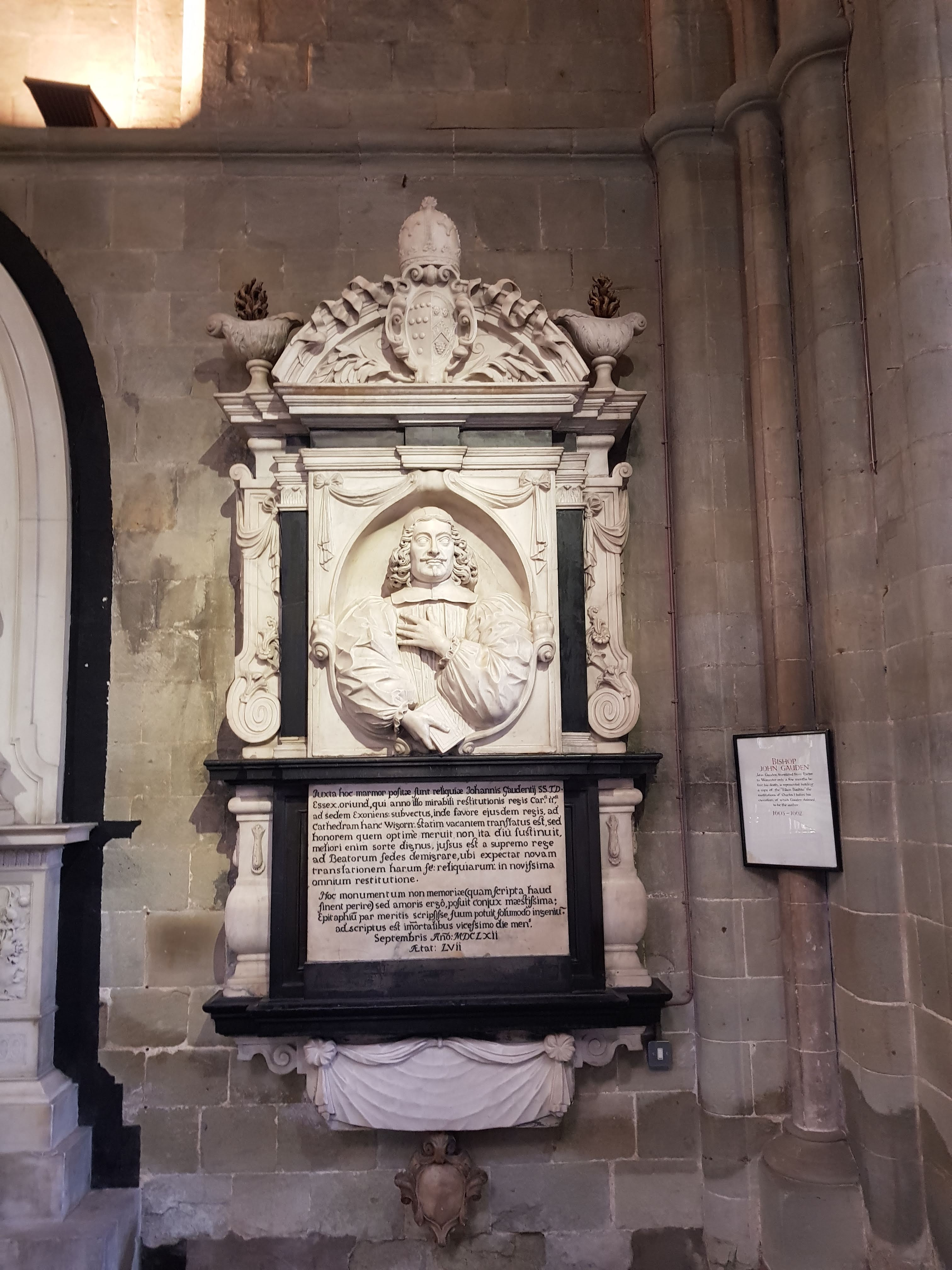
Monument to John Gauden, Worcester Cathedral

John Gauden (died 20 September 1662) was an English cleric. He was Bishop of Exeter then Bishop of Worcester. He was also a writer, and the reputed author of the important Royalist work Eikon Basilike.

== Life ==
He was born at Mayland, Essex, where his father, also named John Gauden, was vicar of the parish, and educated at Bury St Edmunds school and at St John's College, Cambridge, where he graduated Bachelor of Arts in 1623 and Master of Arts in 1626. By his matriculation at Michaelmas 1619, the Oxford Dictionary of National Biography gives him a birth year 1599/1600; whereas A Cambridge Alumni Database gives 1605. He then moved to Wadham College, Oxford, where he graduated Bachelor of Divinity in 1635 and Doctor of Divinity in 1641.

He married Elizabeth, daughter of William Russell of Chippenham, Cambridgeshire, Treasurer of the Navy and his second wife Elizabeth Gerard, and widow of Edward Lewkenor of Denham in Suffolk, and was tutor at Oxford to two of his wife's brothers. They had five children, four sons and a daughter. He seems to have remained at Oxford until 1630, when he became vicar of Chippenham. His sympathies were at first with the parliamentary party. He was chaplain to Robert Rich, 2nd Earl of Warwick, and preached before the House of Commons in 1640.

In 1641 he was appointed to the rural deanery of Bocking. Apparently, his views changed as the revolutionary tendency of the Presbyterian party became more pronounced, for in 1649 he addressed to Lord Fairfax A Religious and Loyal Protestation... against the proceedings of the parliament. Under the Commonwealth he faced both ways, keeping his ecclesiastical preferment, but publishing from time to time pamphlets on behalf of the Church of England. While in Bocking he met William Juniper, the "Gosfield Seer" whom he first dismissed as a harmless fool. However, he was later impressed by prophecies made by Juniper, first that the King would be overthrown, and then that the monarchy would be restored.

At the Restoration he was made Bishop of Exeter; he was elected to the See on 3 November 1660, confirmed 17 November, and consecrated a bishop on 2 December 1660. He immediately began to complain to Edward Hyde, 1st Earl of Clarendon, of the poverty of the See, and based claims for a better benefice on a certain secret service, which he explained in January 1661 to be the sole invention of the Eikon Basilike, The Pourtraicture of his sacred Majestie in his Solitudes and Sufferings, put forth within a few hours after the execution of Charles I as written by the king himself. To which Clarendon replied that he had been before acquainted with the secret and had often wished he had remained ignorant of it. Gauden was advanced in 1662, not as he had wished to the See of Winchester, but to Worcester. He was duly elected to the See of Worcester on 23 May and that election was confirmed on 10 June 1662. He died on 20 September the same year: his enemies said that he had died of chagrin at not getting the see of Winchester. His widow died in 1671: Samuel Pepys, a close friend of John's brother Sir Denis Gauden, the Navy Victualler and Sheriff of the City of London, praised her charm and conversational skills.

== Authorship question ==
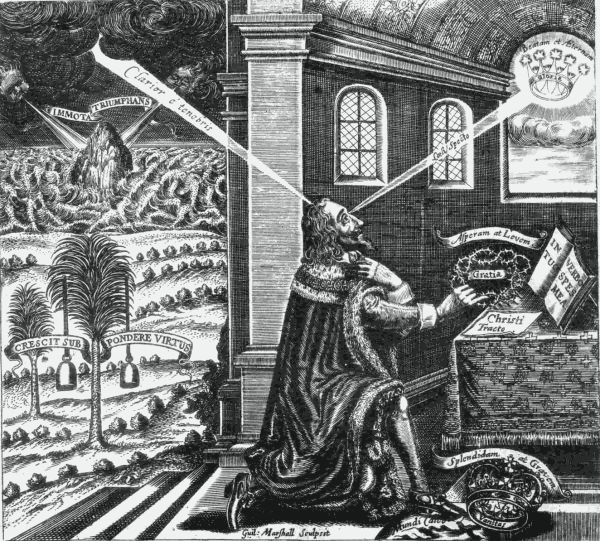
The famous frontispiece of the Eikon Basilike.

The evidence in favour of Gauden's authorship rests chiefly on his own assertions and those of his wife (who after his death sent to her son John a narrative of the claim), and on the fact that it was admitted by Clarendon, who should have had means of being acquainted with the truth. Gauden's letters on the subject are printed in the appendix to vol. iii. of the Clarendon Papers.

The argument is that Gauden had prepared the book to inspire sympathy with the king through a representation of his pious and forgiving disposition, and so to rouse public opinion against his execution. In 1693 further correspondence between Gauden, Clarendon, the Duke of York (later James II & VII), and Sir Edward Nicholas was published by Arthur North, who had found them among the papers of his sister-in-law, a daughter-in-law of Bishop Gauden; but doubt has been thrown on the authenticity of these papers. Gauden stated that he had begun the book in 1647 and was entirely responsible for it. But it is contended that the work was in existence at the Battle of Naseby, and testimony to Charles's authorship is brought forward from various witnesses who had seen Charles himself occupied with it at various times during his imprisonment.

It is stated that the MS. was delivered by one of the king's agents to Edward Symmons, rector of Raine, near Bocking, and that it was in the handwriting of Oudart, Sir Edward Nicholas's secretary. The internal evidence has, as is usual in such cases, been brought forward as a conclusive argument in favour of both contentions.

Doubt was thrown on Charles's authorship in John Milton's Eikonoklastes (1649), which was followed almost immediately by a royalist answer, The Princely Pelican. Royall Resolves Extracted from his Majestys Divine Meditations, with satisfactory reasons that his Sacred Person was the only Author of them (1649). The history of the whole controversy, which has been several times renewed, was dealt with in Christopher Wordsworth's tracts in a most exhaustive way. He eloquently advocated Charles's authorship. Since he wrote in 1829, some further evidence has been forthcoming in favour of the Naseby copy.

A correspondence relating to the French translation of the work has also come to light among the papers of Sir Edward Nicholas. None of the letters show any doubt that King Charles was the author. S. R. Gardiner (Hist. of the Great Civil War, iv, 325) regards Charles Doble's articles as finally disposing of Charles's claim to the authorship, but this is by no means the attitude of other writers.

If Gauden was the author, he may have incorporated papers, &c., by Charles, who may have corrected the work and thus been joint-author. This theory would reconcile the conflicting evidence, that of those who saw Charles writing parts and read the MS. before publication, and the deliberate statements of Gauden.

== Notes ==
Church of England titles
| Preceded by Ralph Brownrigg | Bishop of Exeter; 1660–1662 | Succeeded by Seth Ward |
| Preceded by George Morley | Bishop of Worcester; 1662 | Succeeded by John Earle |
