= Mark Baggot =

Irish Jacobite politician and soldier

Mark Baggot (died 1718) was an Irish Jacobite politician and soldier.

On 28 January 1684, Baggot was one of the founding members of the Dublin Philosophical Society. In 1689, he was elected as a Member of Parliament for Carlow in the short-lived Patriot Parliament summoned by James II of England. James II also appointed Baggot as High Sheriff of Carlow. During the Williamite War in Ireland, he served as a captain in Colonel John Grace's Regiment of Infantry.

He appears to not have been targeted in the Williamite reprisals of the 1690s, possibly owing to his membership of the Dublin Philosophical Society and friendship with Bishop William King. However, on 16 April 1701, a group of Protestant gentry from County Meath submitted a petition to the Dublin Castle administration requesting that Baggot be deprived of his estates, describing Baggot as a "violent papist". His estates were subsequently seized and granted to Philip Savage in 1702.

Parliament of Ireland
Preceded by Sir John Temple; Thomas Burdett	Member of Parliament for Carlow; 1689; With: John Warren	Succeeded by Sir William Russell, Bt; Walter Weldon
