= Russell baronets of Langherne (1660) =

Escutcheon of the Russell baronets of Langherne

The Russell baronetcy, of Langherne (Laugharne) in the County of Carmarthen, was created in the Baronetage of England on 8 November 1660 for William Russell, a younger son of Sir William Russell of Chippenham. The title became extinct on his death in about 1714.

== Russell baronets, of Langherne (1660) ==
- Sir William Russell, 1st Baronet (died c. 1714). He married Hester Rouse, daughter of Thomas Rouse, in 1641. He died without male heir.
