= Russell baronets of Wytley (1627) =

British baronet

Escutcheon of the Russell baronets of Wytley and Strensham

The Russell baronetcy, of Wytley in the County of Worcester (i.e. Witley Court, Great Witley), was created in the Baronetage of England on 12 March 1627 for William Russell. He represented Worcestershire in the House of Commons. The second Baronet sat as Member of Parliament for Tewkesbury. The title became extinct on his death in 1705.

== Russell baronets, of Wytley (1627) ==
- Sir William Russell, 1st Baronet (c. 1602–1669)
- Sir Francis Russell, 2nd Baronet (c. 1638–1706)
