= Russell baronets =

Set index for Russell baronets

There have been seven baronetcies created for persons with the surname Russell, three in the Baronetage of England and four in the Baronetage of the United Kingdom.

- Russell baronets of Wytley (1627)
- Russell baronets of Chippenham (1629)
- Russell baronets of Langherne (1660)
- Russell baronets of Swallowfield (1812)
- Russell baronets of Charlton Park (1832)
- Russell baronets of Littleworth Corner (1916)
- Russell baronets of Olney (1917): see Sir Thomas Russell, 1st Baronet
