= Chippenham, Cambridgeshire =

Village and civil parish in England

Coordinates: 52.30°N 0.43°E

Chippenham
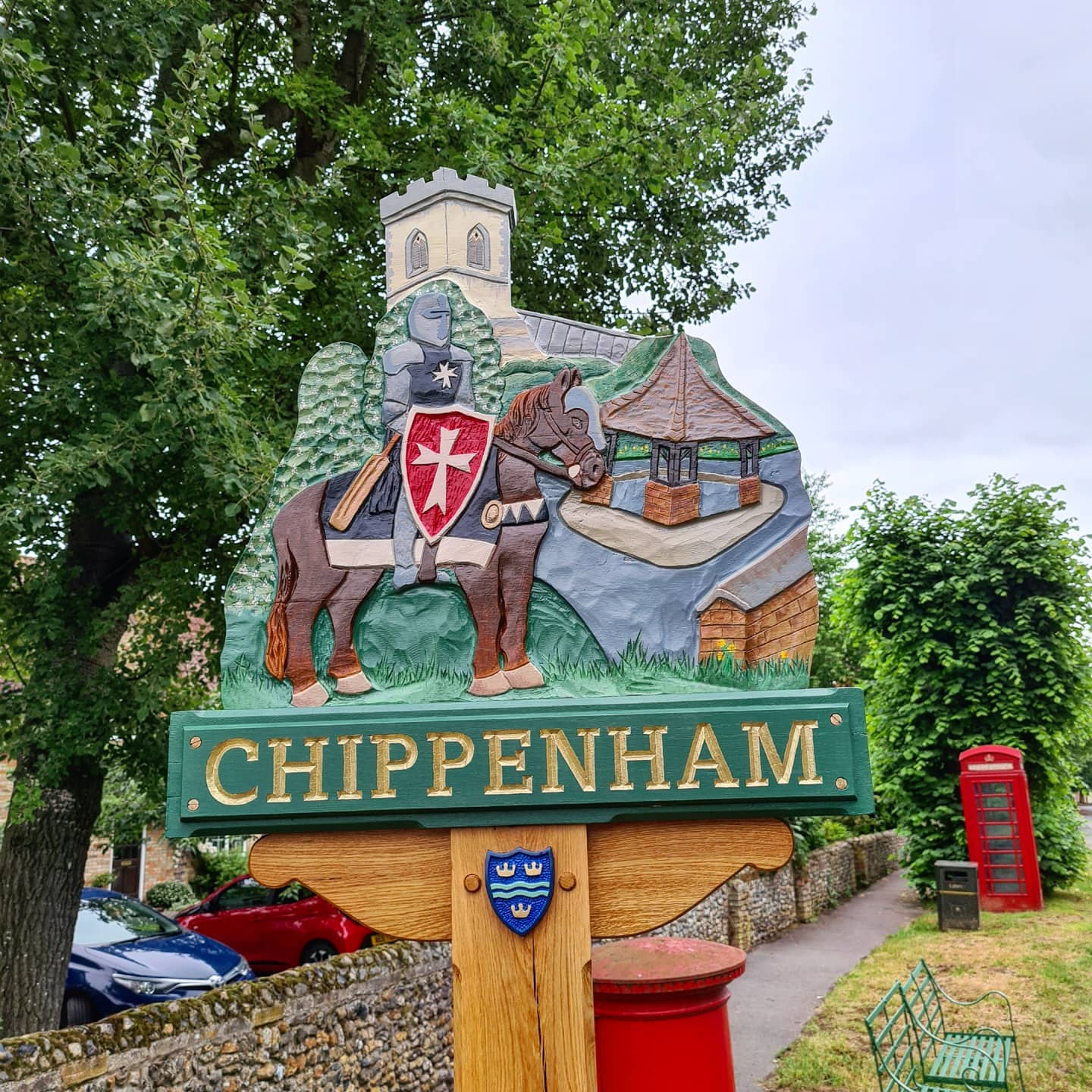
- Chippenham village sign

- Location within Cambridgeshire
- Population: 517 (2011)
- OS grid reference: TL661697
- Civil parish: Chippenham
- District: East Cambridgeshire
- Shire county: Cambridgeshire
- Region: East
- Country: England
- Sovereign state: United Kingdom
- Post town: ELY
- Postcode district: CB7
- Dialling code: 01638
- Police: Cambridgeshire
- Fire: Cambridgeshire
- Ambulance: East of England
- UK Parliament: South East Cambridgeshire
- Website: Chippenham Village Website

Chippenham is a village and civil parish in Cambridgeshire, England, part of East Cambridgeshire district around 4 miles (6.4 km) north-east of Newmarket and 10 miles (16 km) north-east of Cambridge.

== History ==
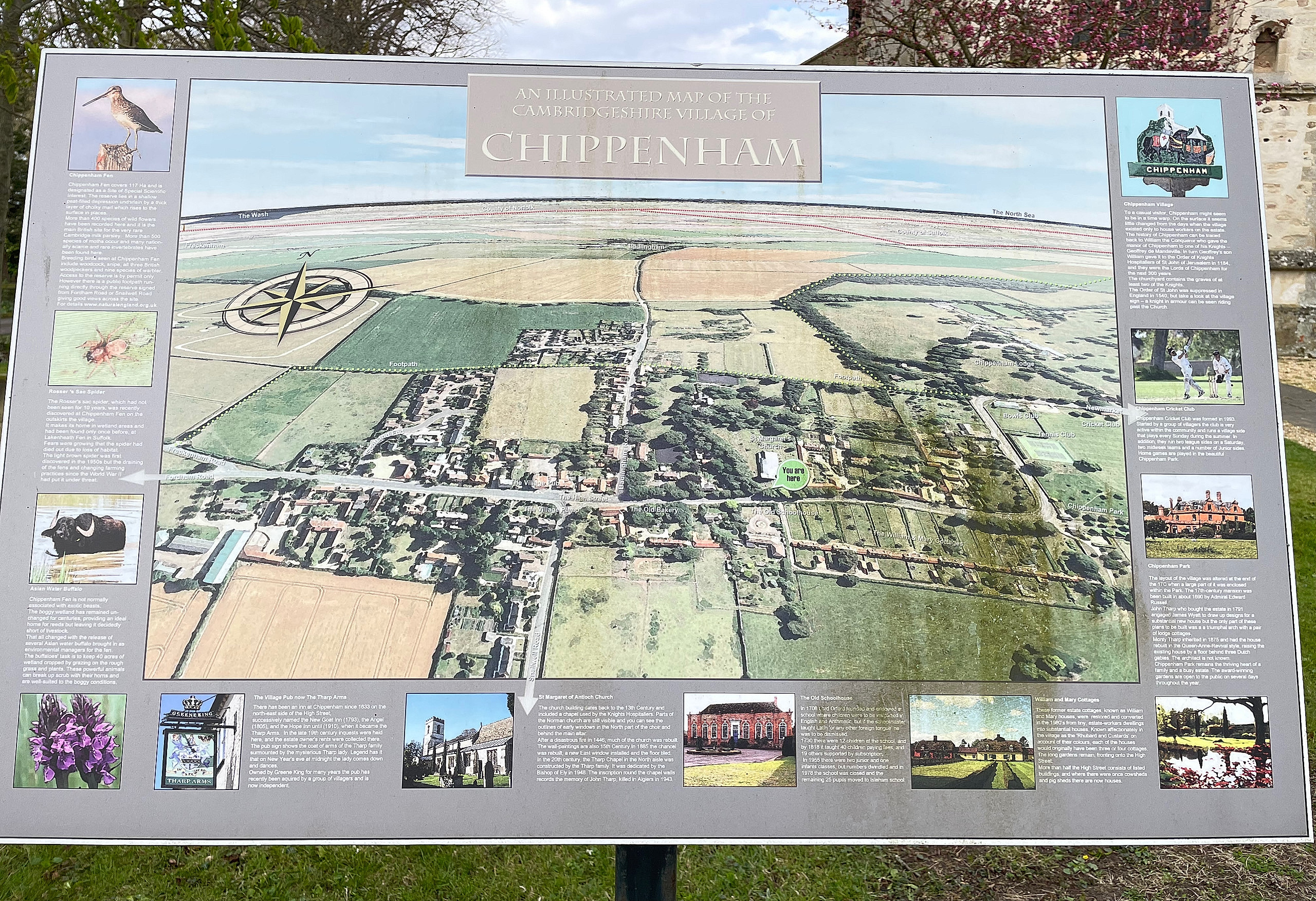
Map of Chippenham

The parish of Chippenham covers 4,300 acres (1,700 ha) at the eastern end of Cambridgeshire. It is bordered by Suffolk to both the north (where the border follows the River Kennett) and the south (where the border follows the Icknield Way). To the east it is separated from Kennett, and to the west there are borders with Fordham and Snailwell, and a short border with Isleham. The present parish incorporates both the smaller medieval parish and the hamlet of Badlingham. Listed as Chipeham in the Domesday Book of 1086, the name "Chippenham" probably means "river meadow of a man called Cippa".

Chippenham Park is a large country estate created by Edward Russell, 1st Earl of Orford.

== Church ==
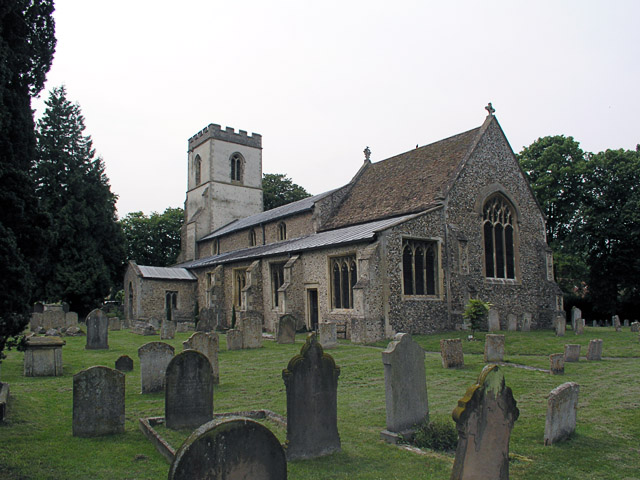
St Margaret's Church

There has been a church in Chippenham since at least the 12th century which served both Chippenham and Badlingham. The present parish church has been dedicated to Saint Margaret of Antioch since 1279, and consists of a chancel with south chapel and north vestry, an aisled nave of seven bays, and a rectangular west tower. The oldest parts of the building date from the 12th century. The tower was rebuilt in the 15th century.

The church has four 15th-century wall paintings that were plastered over with psalms in the 17th century, and rediscovered in the late 19th century.

John Gauden, later Bishop of Exeter and Worcester, was vicar of Chippenham in the 1630s.

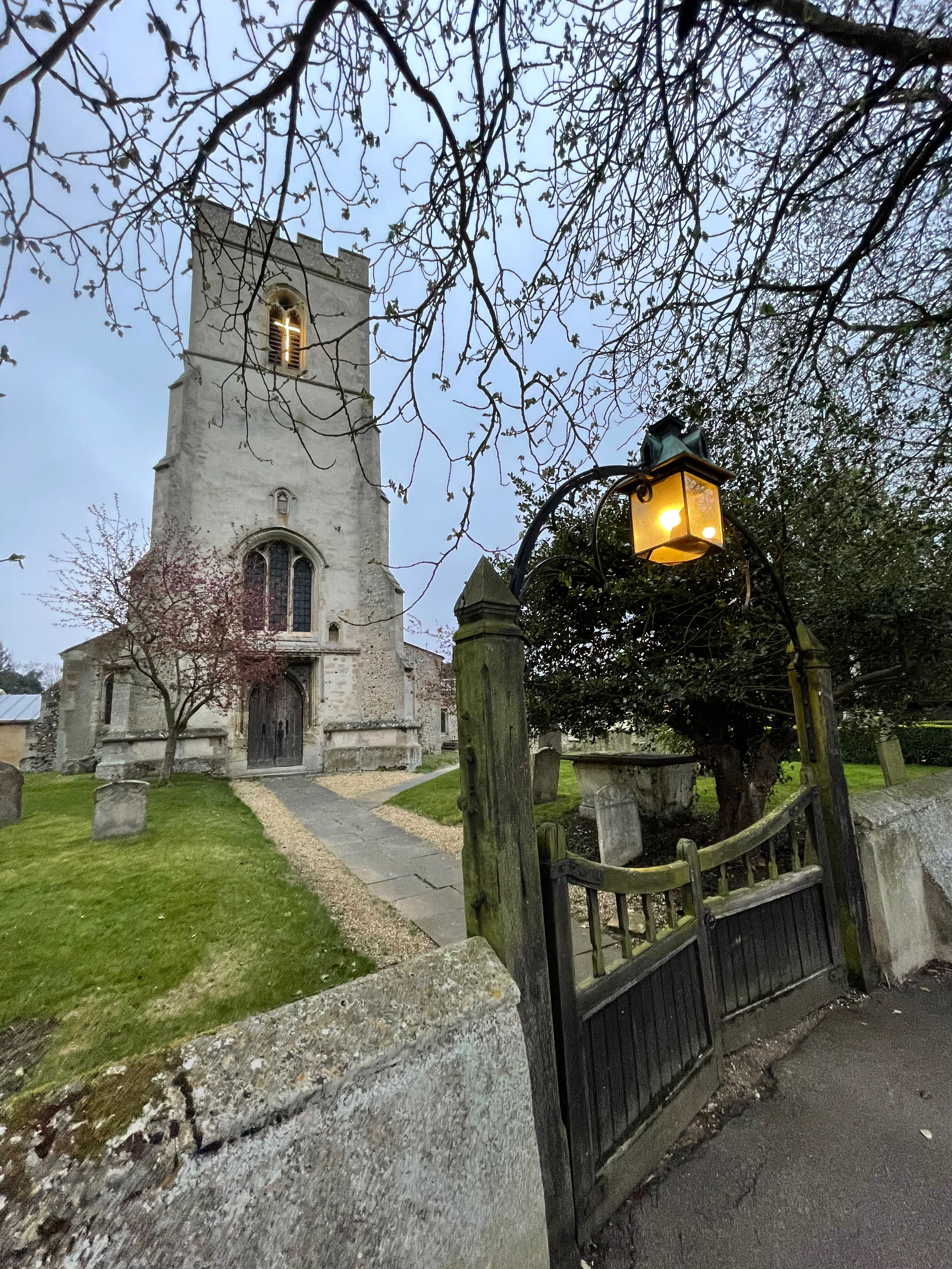
Front entrance to St Margaret's church

== Village life ==
The village has one pub, The Tharp Arms, which was opened in 1704 on the High Street. In the 18th century it was known as the New Goat Inn after which it was renamed The Angel and then The Hope Inn before receiving its present name in 1910. There was also an outdoor beer tent listed in the village in the 1850s.

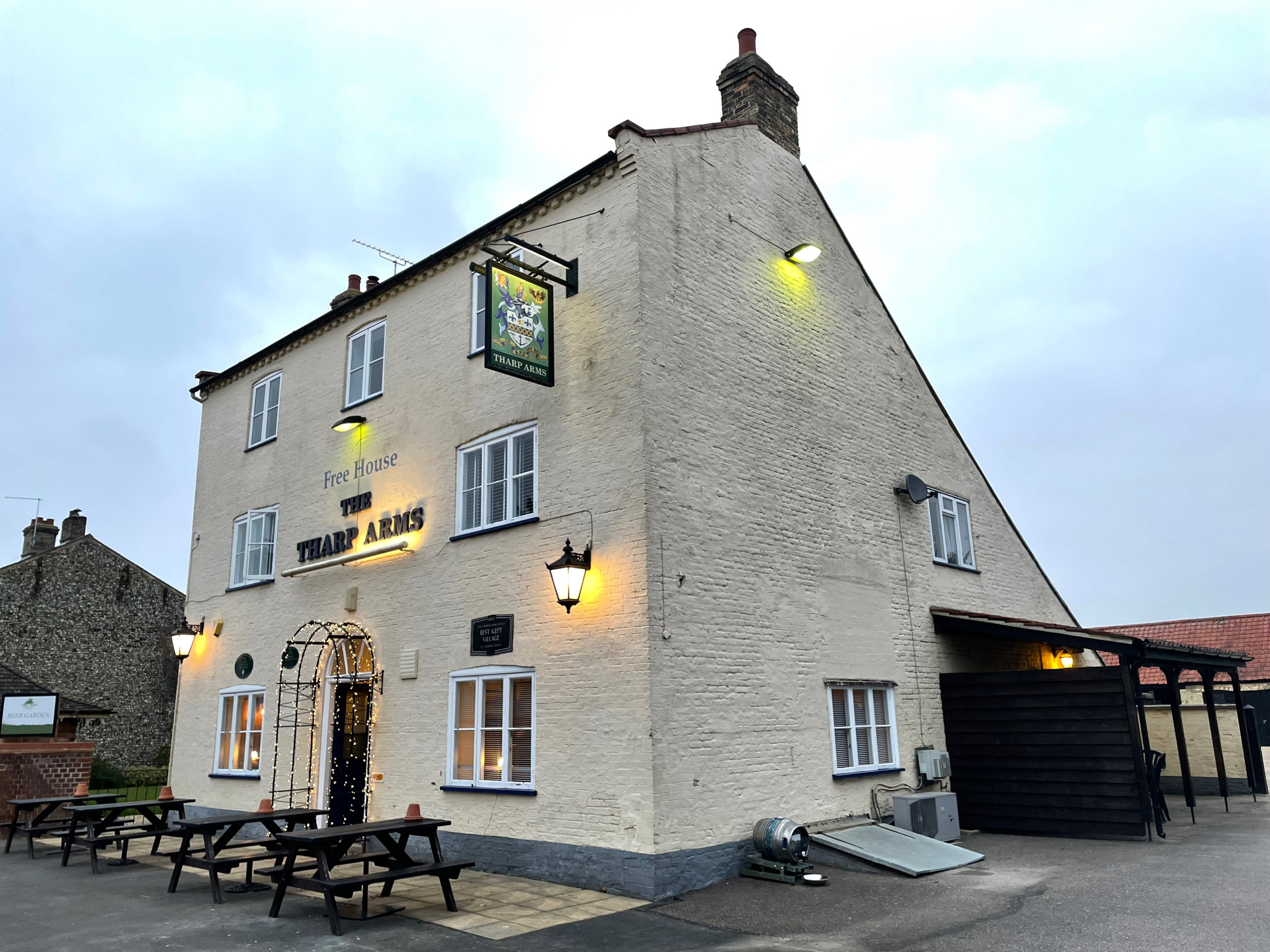
The Tharp Arms

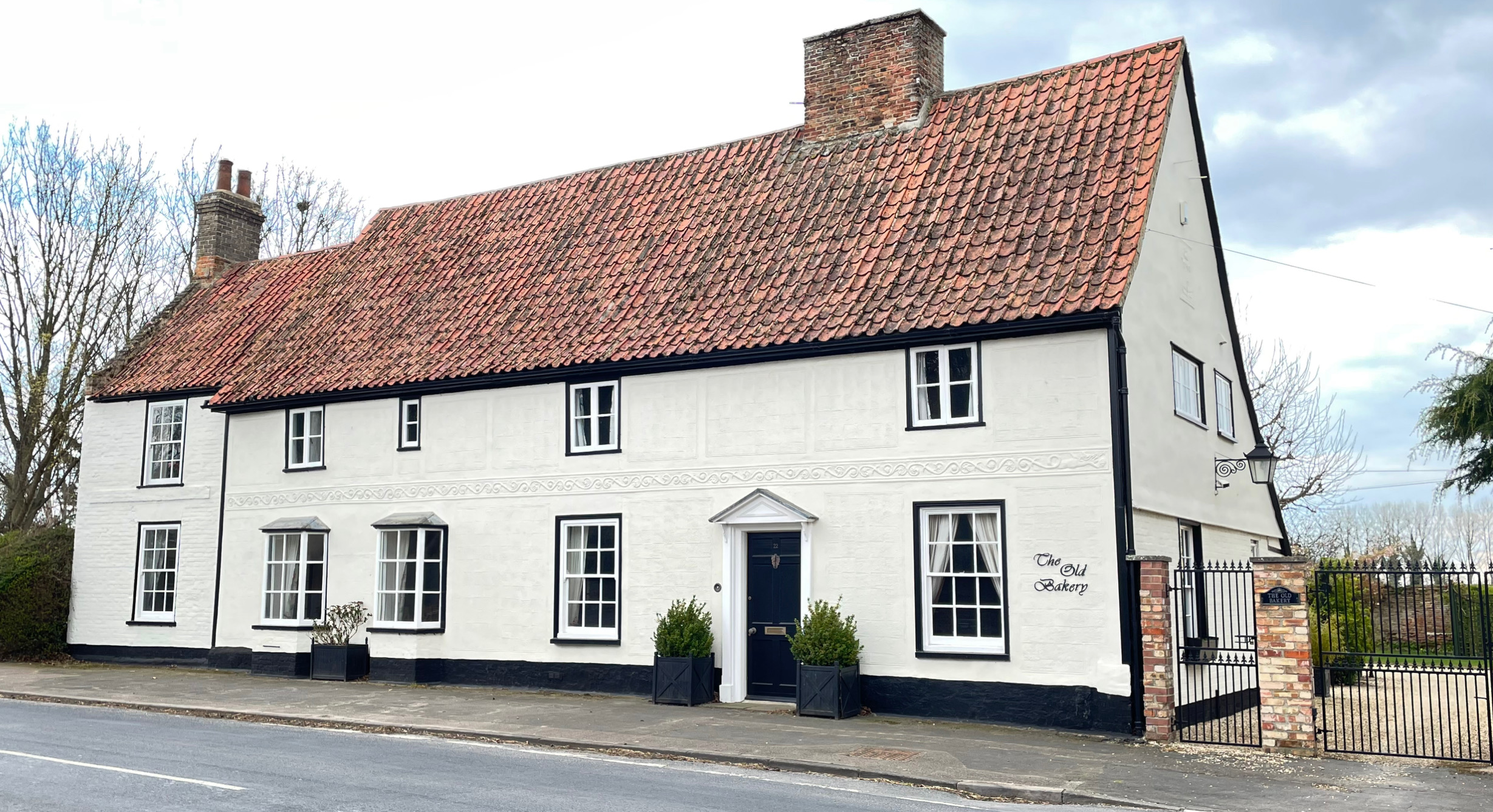
The old bakery building

The village's water pump which stands at the junction of the High Street and Snailwell Road was last used in 1948 and has an unusual cap.

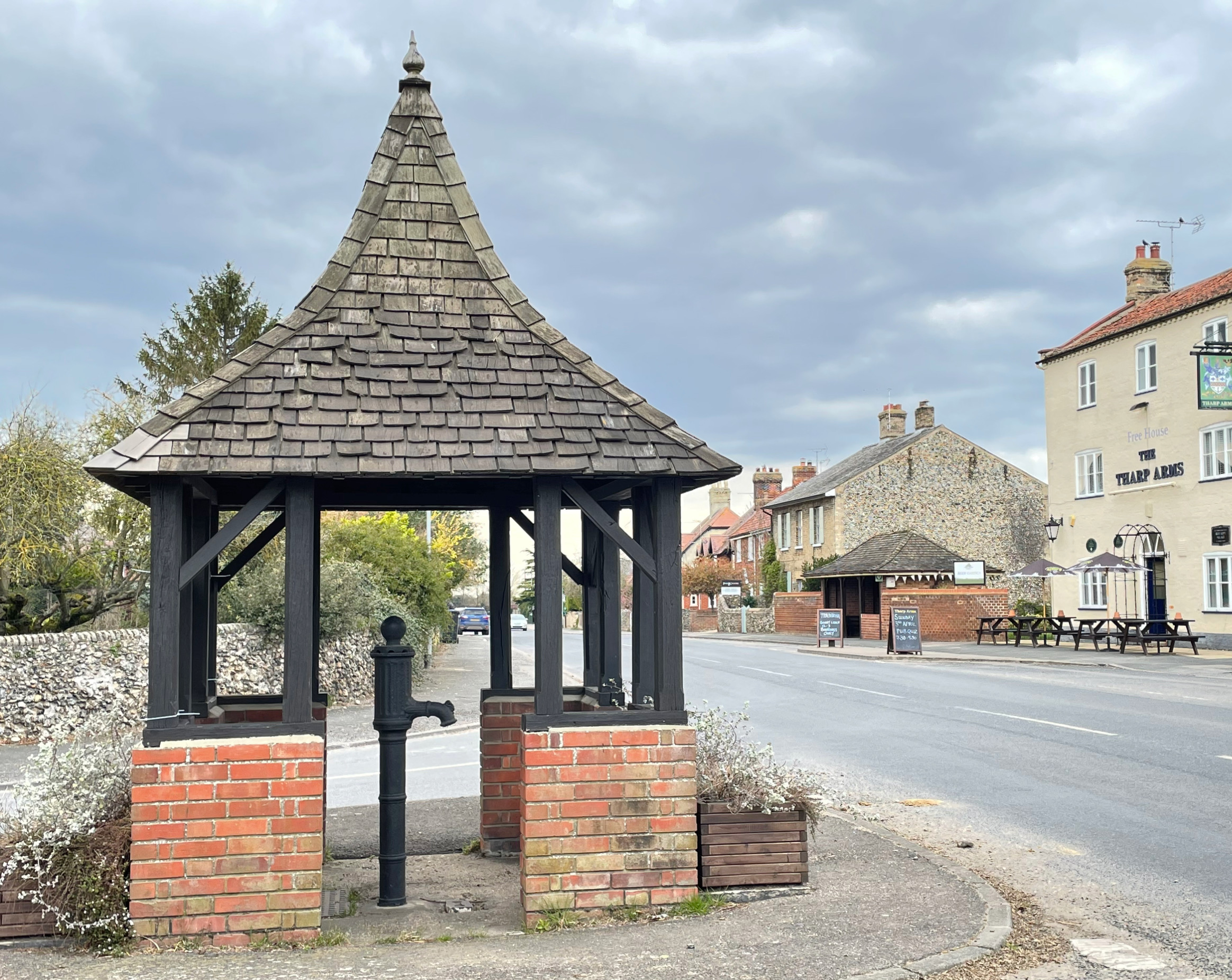
The water pump, Chippenham

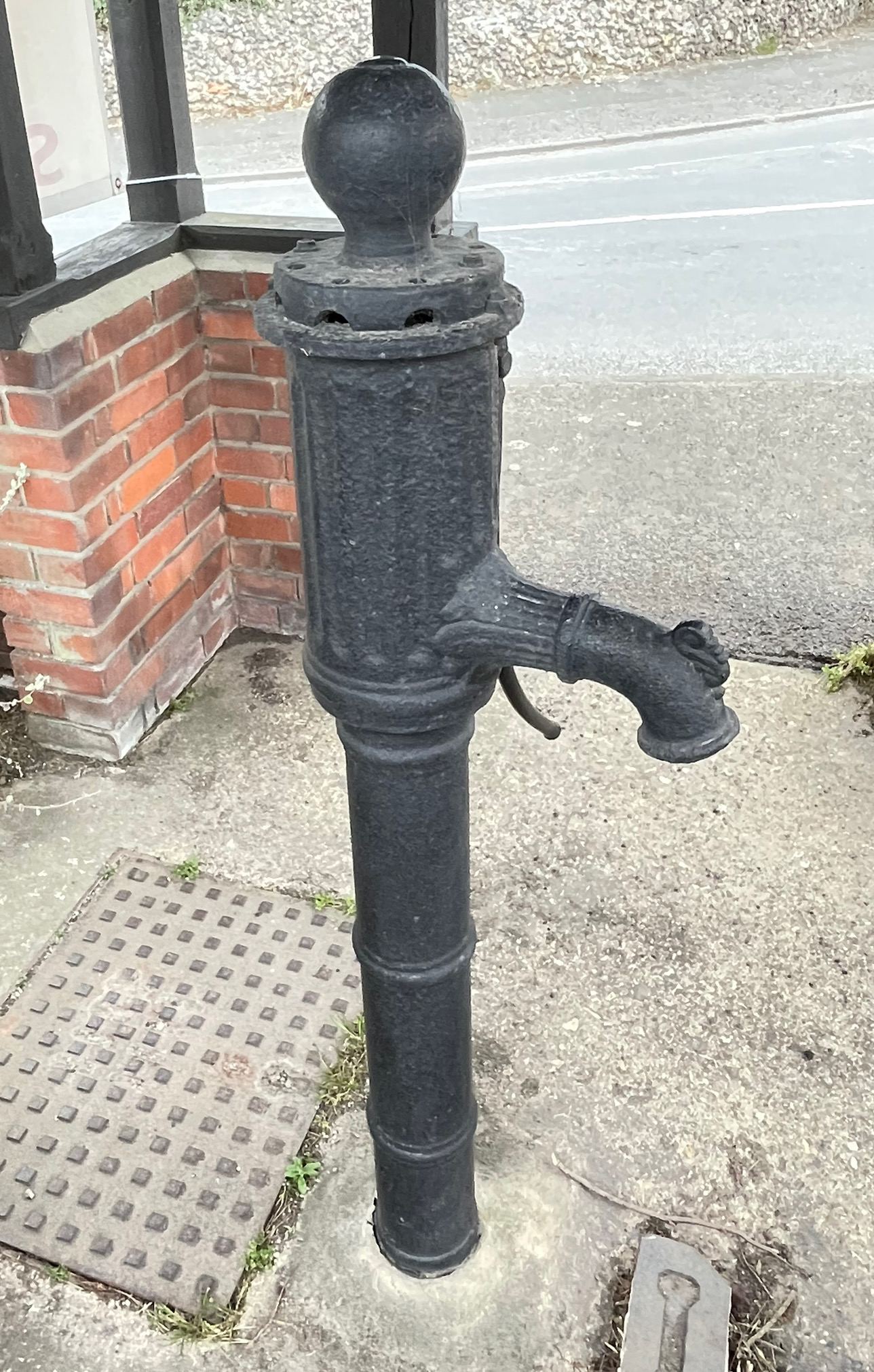
Detail of the water pump

Lord Orford founded the village's first school in 1708 and by 1712 a school building had been completed opposite the church (which survives today as a house). In 1821 additional space was added for junior children and children also attended from neighbouring Snailwell. In the mid-19th century the attendance was around 36, and after 1875 it rose steadily until there were 100 pupils in 1910. This then fell to 77 in 1919 and under 40 by the 1930s. In 1954 senior children were moved to Burwell and when numbers had fallen to only 25 juniors in 1978 the school closed, with the remaining children transferred to Isleham.

A playground was built behind Tharp Way in 1980.

== Chippenham Fen ==
Chippenham Fen is a National Nature Reserve and part of the Fenland Special Area of Conservation.

Chippenham Fen
