= Belasyse =

Belasyse is a surname, and may refer to:

- Anthony Belasyse (died 1522), English clergyman
- Sir Henry Belasyse, 1st Baronet (1555–1624), English politician
- Henry Belasyse (1604–1647), English Royalist politician
- Sir Henry Belasyse (c.1639–1667), English politician
- Sir Henry Belasyse (1648–1717), English soldier and MP
- Henry Belasyse, 2nd Earl Fauconberg (1742–1802), British Whig peer and MP
- John Belasyse, 1st Baron Belasyse (1614–1689), English Royalist officer, peer, and MP
- Thomas Belasyse, 1st Earl Fauconberg (c.1627–1700), English peer, Parliamentarian of the English Civil War
- Thomas Belasyse, 1st Viscount Fauconberg (1557–1653), English Royalist peer and MP

== See also ==
- Bellasis
