= Armine =

Armine is a name. It may refer to:

== Given name ==
- Armine, female counterpart of the Armenian given name Armen
- Arminė, feminine form of the Lithuanian given name Arminas
- Armine Wodehouse (disambiguation)
- Armine Dew (1867–1941), British Indian Army officer
- Armine Khachatryan (born 1986), Armenian women's footballer
- Armine Rhea Mendoza, Filipino female writer
- Armine Sandford (1928–2011), English actress and news presenter
- Armine Tadevosyan, Armenian women's footballer
- Armine von Tempski (1892–1943), American female writer

== Surname ==
- Mary Armine (died 1676), English gentlewoman and benefactor
- Sir William Armine, 1st Baronet (1593–1651), English politician
- Sir William Armine, 2nd Baronet (1622–1658), English politician
