= Henry Belasyse =

Henry Belasyse or Bellasis may refer to:

- Sir Henry Belasyse, 1st Baronet (1555–1624), MP
- Henry Belasyse (1604–1647), MP
- Sir Henry Belasyse (died 1667) (c. 1639–1667), MP
- Henry Belasyse, 2nd Baron Belasyse (died 1691)
- Sir Henry Belasyse (died 1717) (1648–1717), soldier and MP
- Henry Belasyse, 2nd Earl Fauconberg (1742–1802), British politician and peer
