= Francis Head =

Francis Head may refer to:

- Sir Francis Bond Head (1793–1875), Lieutenant-Governor of Upper Canada during the rebellion of 1837
- Francis Head (cricketer) (1846–1941), English cricketer
- Sir Francis Head, 4th Baronet (1693–1768)
