= Thomas Belasyse =

Thomas Belasyse may refer to:

- Thomas Belasyse, 1st Earl Fauconberg (1627–1700), English peer
- Thomas Belasyse, 1st Earl Fauconberg (second creation) (1699–1774), British peer
- Thomas Belasyse, 1st Viscount Fauconberg (1577–1653), English politician
