= Baron Belasyse =

Extinct barony in the Peerage of England

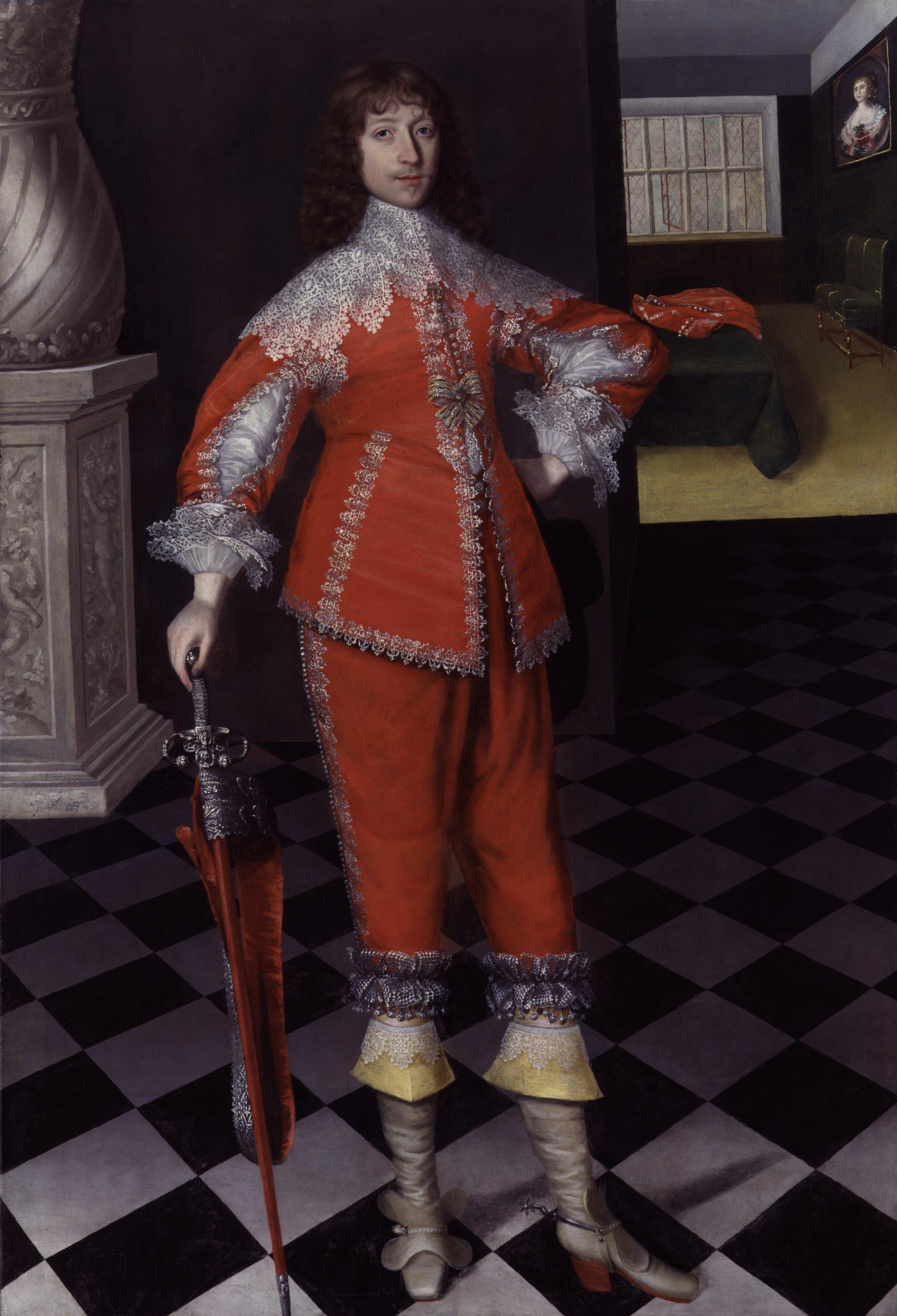
John Belasyse, 1st Baron Belasyse

Baron Belasyse was a title that was created twice in the Peerage of England.

== History ==
The first creation came on 27 January 1645 when the Honourable John Belasyse was made Baron Belasyse of Worlaby in the County of Lincoln. He was the second son of Thomas Belasyse, 1st Viscount Fauconberg, the younger brother of the Honourable Henry Belasyse and the uncle of Thomas Belasyse, 1st Earl Fauconberg (see Viscount Fauconberg for earlier history of the family). He was succeeded by his grandson, Henry, the second Baron, the son of Sir Henry Belasyse, who was killed in a duel in 1667. The title became extinct when the second Baron died childless in 1691.

The second creation came on 1 April 1674 when Susan, Lady Belasyse, widow of the aforementioned Sir Henry Belasyse, son of the first Baron Belasyse, was made Baroness Belasyse of Osgodby in the County of Lincoln. This was a rare life peerage and became extinct on her death without surviving issue in 1713. Lady Belasyse was the daughter of Sir William Armine, 2nd Baronet (see Armine baronets), and his wife Anne Crane. She was "a lady of much life and vivacity".

== Barons Belasyse; first creation (1645) ==
- John Belasyse, 1st Baron Belasyse (1614–1689)
  - Henry Belasyse (died 1667)
- Henry Belasyse, 2nd Baron Belasyse (died 1691)

== Baroness Belasyse; second creation (1674) ==
- Susan Belasyse, Baroness Belasyse (died 1713)

== See also ==
- Viscount Fauconberg
- Armine baronets
- Baron Fauconberg
