= Edward Bellasis =

Edward Bellasis may refer to:

- Edward Bellasis (lawyer) (1800–1873), English serjeant-at-law and Roman Catholic convert
- Edward Bellasis (officer of arms) (1852–1922), his son, English genealogist
