= Bellasis =

Bellasis is a surname, and may refer to:

- Edward Bellasis (lawyer) (1800–1873), English lawyer and Catholic convert
- Edward Bellasis (officer of arms) (1852–1922), English herald, son of the herald
- John Bellasis (East India Company officer) (1743–1808), British major-general

== See also ==
- Belasyse
