= William Airmine =

William Airmine may refer to:

- William Airmine (MP for Lincolnshire) in 1388, MP for Lincolnshire (UK Parliament constituency)
- Sir William Armine, 1st Baronet (1593–1651)
- Sir William Armine, 2nd Baronet (1622–1658)
