= Head baronets =

Hereditary title awarded by the British Crown

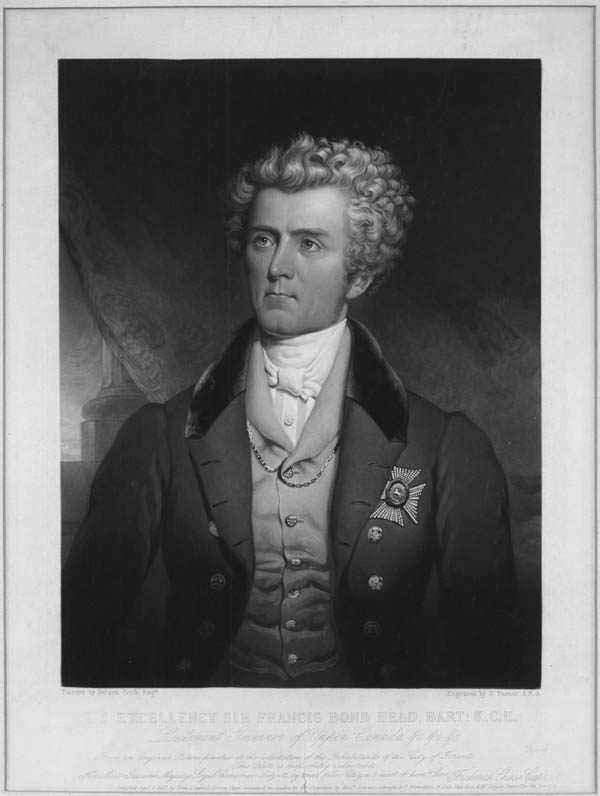
Sir Francis Bond Head, 1st Baronet

There have been two baronetcies created for persons with the surname Head, one in the Baronetage of England and one in the Baronetage of the United Kingdom. One creation is extant as of 2007.

Head Baronetcy, of The Hermitage, in the parish of Higham in the County of Kent, was created in the Baronetage of England on 19 June 1676 for Richard Head, Member of Parliament for Rochester. The eighth Baronet was a colonial administrator and served as Governor General of Canada from 1854 to 1861. On his death in 1868 the title became extinct. See also the 1838 creation below.

The Head Baronetcy, of Rochester in the County of Kent, was created in the Baronetage of the United Kingdom on 14 July 1838 for Francis Head, Lieutenant Governor of Upper Canada from 1836 to 1838. He was the son of James Roper Mendes Head and grandson of Moses Mendes, husband of Anna Gabriella, daughter and co-heir of Sir Francis Head, the 4th Baronet of the 1676 creation. His father had assumed by Royal licence the surname of Head in lieu of Mendes in 1770. The Mendes family descended from Fernando Mendes, a Sephardi Jew who came to England in 1662 as personal physician to Catherine of Braganza.

"The family, which is of antiquity in Kent, derives its name from the Kentish port now called Hythe, but formerly known as De Hede". The Head family's ancestral seat was located at The [Great] Hermitage at Higham in Kent,

"a pleasant seat in this parish, situated at almost the south-east extremity of it, about a mile northward from the London road to Dover. It stands on a hill, and commands a most extensive prospect both of the Medway and Thames, the Channel below the Nore, and a vast tract of country both in Kent and Essex. This seat was new built by Sir Francis Head, [4th] bart. who inclosed a park round it (since disparked) and greatly improved the adjoining grounds. He resided here, and died possessed of it, with the manor of Higham Ridgway, and other estates in this parish, in 1768, and was buried in a vault in Higham church.

The Great Hermitage was destroyed by fire in 1938.

== Head baronets, of The Hermitage (1676) ==
- Sir Richard Head, 1st Baronet (c. 1609–1689)
- Sir Francis Head, 2nd Baronet (c. 1670–1716)
- Sir Richard Head, 3rd Baronet (c. 1692–1721)
- Sir Francis Head, 4th Baronet (c. 1693–1768)
- Sir John Head, 5th Baronet (c. 1702–1769)
- Sir Edmund Head, 6th Baronet (1733–1796) buried in Rochester Cathedral
- Sir John Head, 7th Baronet (1773–1838)
- Sir Edmund Walker Head, 8th Baronet (1805–1868)

== Head baronets, of Rochester (1838) ==
Escutcheon of the Head baronets of The Hermitage and of Rochester

- Sir Francis Bond Head, KCH, 1st Baronet (1793–1875)
- Sir Francis Somerville Head, 2nd Baronet (1817–1887)
- Sir Robert Garnett Head, 3rd Baronet (1845–1907)
- Sir Robert Pollock Somerville Head, 4th Baronet (1884–1924)
- Sir Francis David Somerville Head, 5th Baronet (1916–2005)
- Sir Richard Douglas Somerville Head, 6th Baronet (born 1951)

The heir presumptive to the baronetcy is Patrick John Somerville Head (born 1943), eldest son of the 2nd and youngest son of the 4th Baronet, John Kenelm Somerville Head (1918–2010).
