= Andrea Soldi =

Italian painter

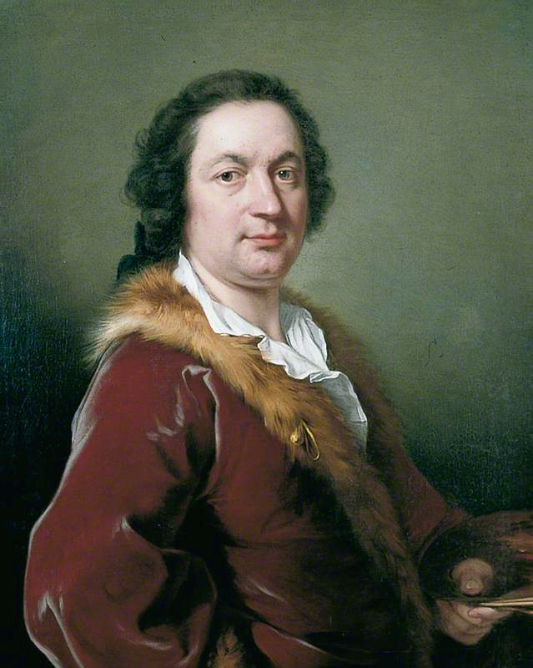
1743 self-portrait of Soldi

Andrea Soldi (c. 1703 – c. 1771) was an Italian painter active in Britain who specialised in portrait painting.

== Life ==
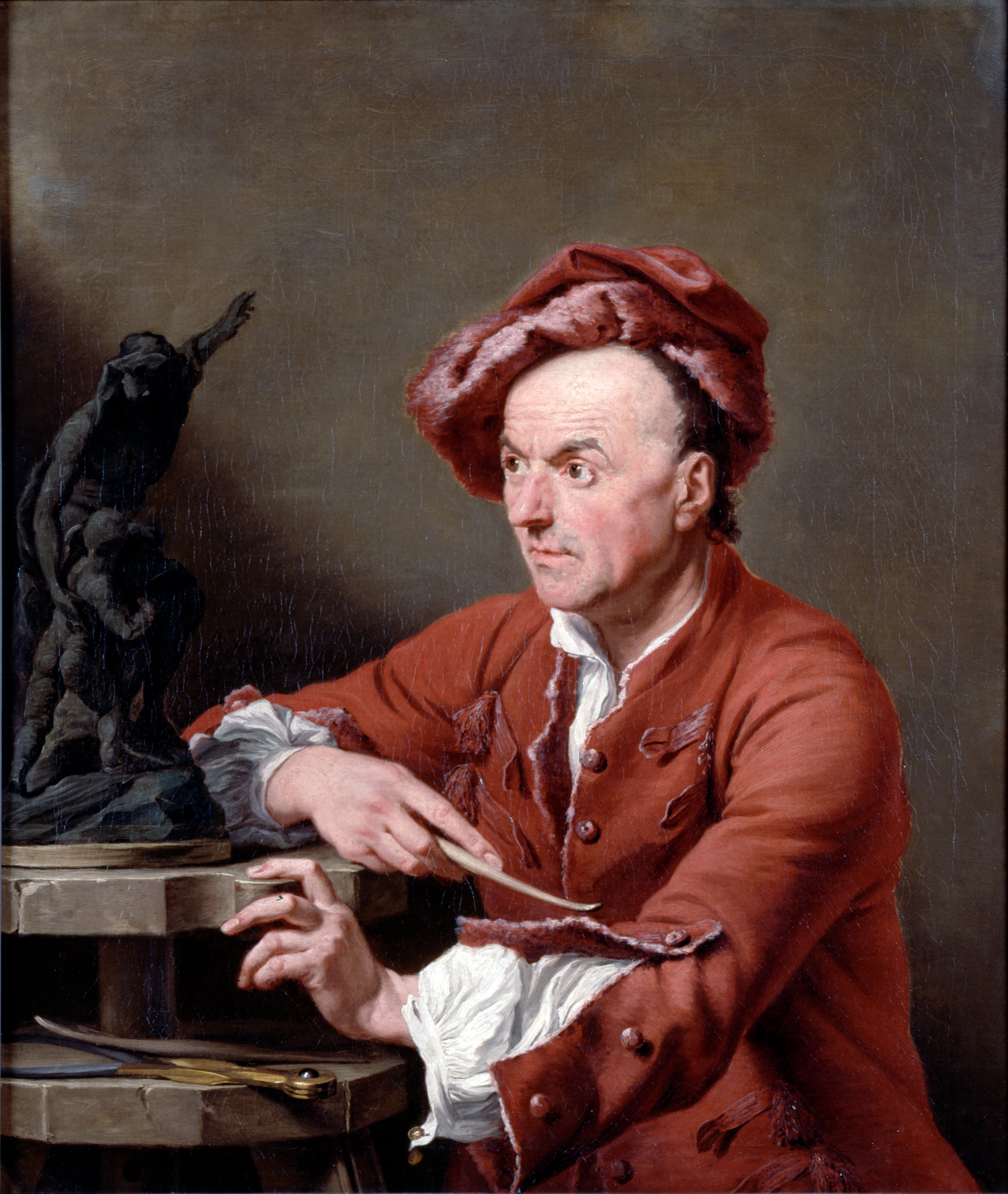
1751 portrait of Louis-François Roubiliac by Soldi

The only remaining source for this painter's early years is George Vertue, who in 1738 stated he was "about thirty-five or rather more", had been born in Florence and had come to England in about 1736 on the advice of British merchants belonging to the Levant Company, who had commissioned their portraits from him during his travels in the Middle East. From 1738 to 1744 he won much success in London's art market and among Italophile noblemen back from their Grand Tour, being preferred to both English portrait practice (fluctuating between Rococo and Kneller-like styles) and to other Italian portraitists in England at the time, such as the Cavaliere Rusca (worked in London 1738–39), and Andrea Casali (worked in London 1741–66). Beginning "above thirty portraits" from April to August 1738 alone (according to Vertue), Soldi's only serious rival was Jean-Baptiste van Loo (in London 1737–42). Particular patrons included the 2nd Duke of Manchester, 3rd Duke of Manchester, 3rd Duke of Beaufort and 4th Viscount Fauconberg. Soldi was imprisoned for debt in 1744, and died in London in 1771, Joshua Reynolds paying for his funeral.

== Works, arranged by sitter ==
- Belasyse
  - eight portraits of the 4th Viscount Fauconberg (Newburgh Priory, North Yorkshire)
  - full-length of Lord Fauconberg (c. 1739; Newburgh Priory, North Yorkshire)
- Cibber
  - Colley Cibber (c. 1738, also painted by van Loo)
- Head
  - Rev. Sir Francis Head, Bt. and his three daughters, 1750.
- McSwiny
  - Owen McSwiny, art dealer (c. 1738, also painted by van Loo)
- Montagu
  - eight portraits of the 2nd and 3rd Dukes of Manchester (sold at Kimbolton Castle, Cambridgeshire, 18 July 1949)
  - seated three-quarter-length of Isabella Montagu, Duchess of Manchester (wife of the 2nd Duke of Manchester), as Diana (1738; London, Colnaghi's, 1986)
- Scudamore
  - four portraits of the 3rd Duke of Beaufort (Badminton House, Gloucestershire)
- Sheppard
  - Two three-quarter-length portraits called Thomas Sheppard (1733 and 1735-6; ex-art market, London, 1917 and 1924, see Ingamells, 1974)
- Soldi
  - Self-portrait (1743; York Art Gallery)
- Stuart
  - James Francis Edward Stuart, Old Pretender of Scotland, half-length portrait (1755, location unknown)

== Gallery ==
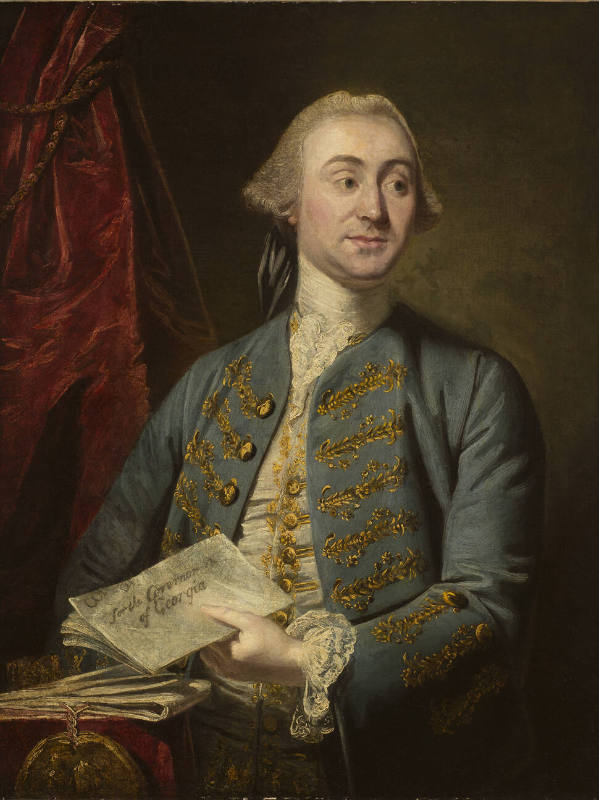
James Wright (c. 1736–1771)

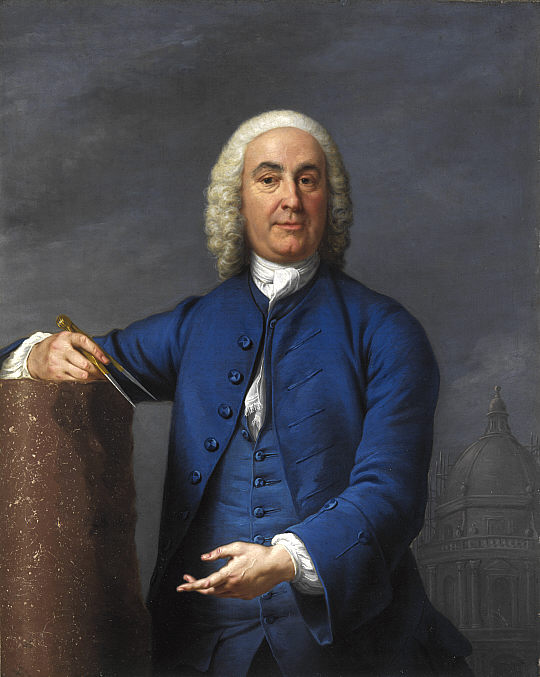
James Gibbs (c. 1750)

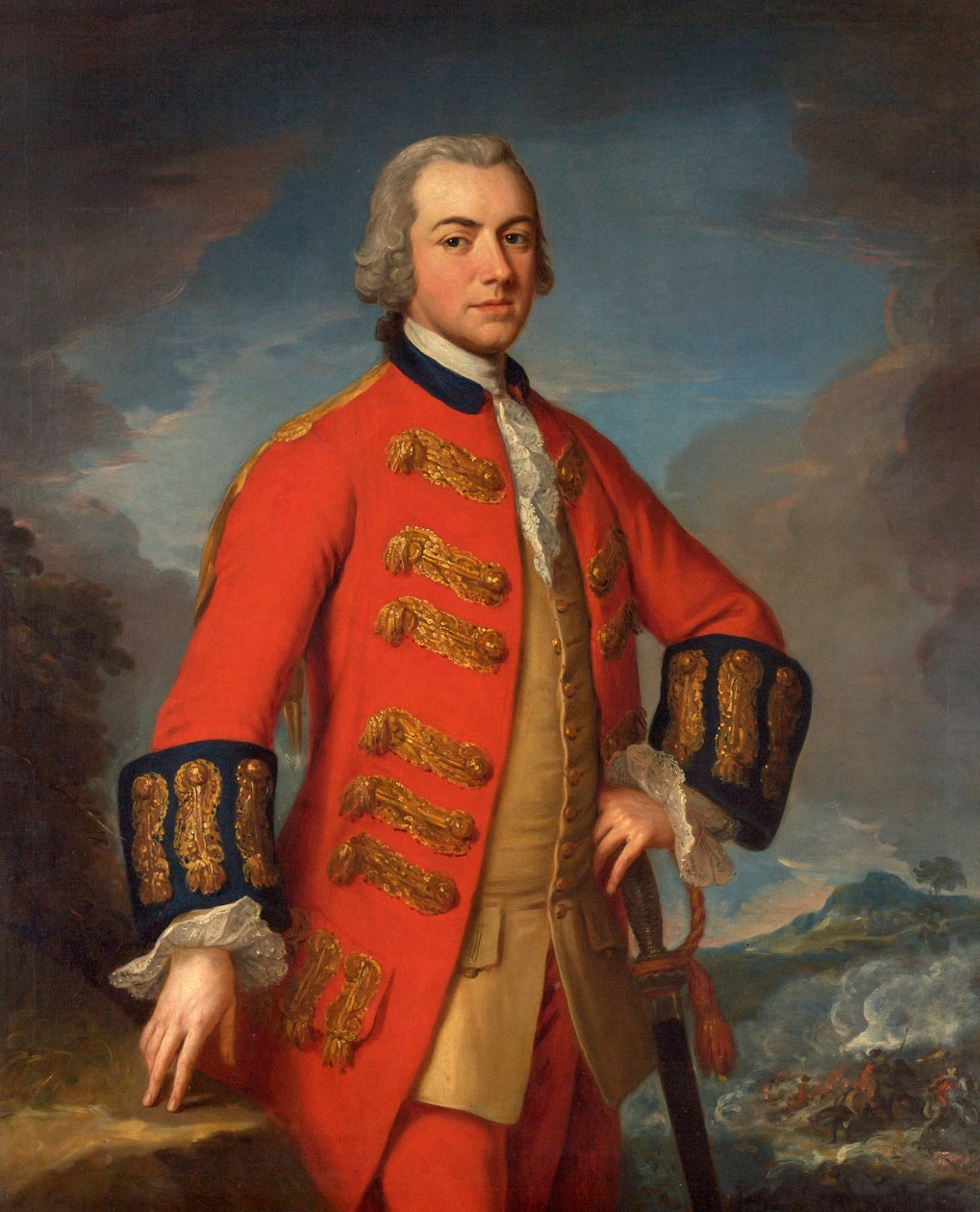
Sir Henry Clinton (c. 1762–1765)

== Bibliography ==
- 'The Concise Grove Dictionary of Art.', 2002, Oxford University Press

== Sources ==
- Andrea Soldi at ARTCYCLOPEDIA
- Portrait of Henry Lannoy Hunter in Oriental Dress, Resting from Hunting, with a Manservant Holding Game, by Soldi (Tate Britain)
- Andrea Soldi on artnet
- Ingamells, Andrea Soldi, a Check-List of his work, in The Volume of the Walpole Society, vol. 47.
