= Treaty 45 =

1836 treaty in Upper Canada

Treaty 45, referred to variously as the Manitoulin Island treaty, the treaty of Manitowaning, or the Bond Head treaty, is a treaty that, by its terms, converted the whole of Manitoulin Island, then in Upper Canada, into a reserve.

Treaty 45 was negotiated in August 1836 between 16 leaders of the Odawa and Ojibwe and Francis Bond Head, as a representative of the British Crown. An entry in The Canadian Encyclopedia suggests that as opposed to "negotiation", what happened instead was simply that Bond Head "collected the signatures" of these leaders on the treaty document. Bond Head had travelled to Manitoulin Island in part for an annual exchange of presents with his Indigenous counterparts; according to historian Robert J. Surtees, he "took more decisive action" in negotiating the treaty once there.

The English-language document memorializing the treaty is in the collection of Library and Archives Canada.

The treaty's conclusion was memorialized on Manitoulin Island in August 2011.

The term "Manitoulin Island treaty" may also refer to a treaty negotiated in 1862.

== Sources ==
- Buchanan, Ruth; Hewitt, Jeffery G (7 November 2017). "Encountering settler colonialism through legal objects: a painted drum and handwritten treaty from Manitoulin Island". Northern Ireland Legal Quarterly. 68 (3): 291–304. doi:10.53386/nilq.v68i3.41. ISSN 2514-4936.
- Surtees, Robert J. (1986). Treaty research report: Manitoulin Island treaties. Ottawa: Treaties and Historical Research Centre; Indian and Northern Affairs Canada. OCLC 153543517. R32-268/1986E-PDF.
