= Armine baronets =

Extinct baronetcy in the Baronetage of England

The Armine baronetcy (also spelt Armyn or Airmine), of Osgodby in the County of Lincoln, was a title in the Baronetage of England. It was created on 28 November 1619 for William Armine, subsequently Member of Parliament for Boston, Grantham and Lincolnshire. The second baronet represented Cumberland in Parliament. The title became extinct on the death of the third baronet in 1668.

Susan, daughter of the second baronet and wife of Sir Henry Belasyse, was created Baroness Belasyse for life on 25 March 1674.

== Armine baronets, of Osgodby (1619) ==
Escutcheon of the Armine baronets of Osgodby

- Sir William Armine, 1st Baronet (1593–1651)
- Sir William Armine, 2nd Baronet (1622–1658)
- Sir Michael Armine, 3rd Baronet (1625–1668)

== See also ==
- Baron Belasyse
