= Earl Fauconberg (1765 ship) =

Greenland whaler

History

Great Britain
- Name: Earl Fauconberg
- Namesake: Thomas Belasyse, 1st Earl Fauconberg
- Owner: Henry W. Yeoman (1784)
- Builder: Whitby
- Launched: 1765
- Fate: Wrecked 1821

General characteristics
- Tons burthen: 331, or 335, or 350 (bm)
- Length: 100 ft (30.5 m)
- Beam: 28 ft (8.5 m)
- Notes: Three masts

Earl Fauconberg (or Earl of Fauconberg, or Earl Fauconburg, or Earl Falconberg, or Fauconburg) was launched at Whitby in 1765. From 1784 on she made numerous voyages as a Greenland whaler. She was lost there in 1821.

== Career ==
Earl Fauconberg's early career is obscure as she did not enter Lloyd's Register (LR) until 1784. She first entered LR with T. Johnson, master, "H.Yeomn", owner, and trade Whitby–Davis Strait. She had undergone repairs in 1777.

Between 1784 and 1799 Earl Fauconberg made annual voyages to the Greenland whale fisheries from Whitby.

There are occasional press mentions of whales taken. Thus on 18 July 1788, Lloyd's List (LL) reported on vessels still at Davis Strait and among the Whitby ships, listed Earl Falconberg with "2 Fish".

Francis Agar was master of Earl Faucenberg in 1791 and in 1799–1800.

The Register of Shipping (RS) for 1801 showed Earl Falconberg (of 351 tons burthen, launched at Whitby in 1765), with J. Crosby, master, J. Atty, owner, and trade Newcastle–London. Although one source reports that Earl Fauconberg was sold to Grimbsby in 1801, she proceeded to make four whaling voyages from Kingston upon Hull.

In 1807, after the Battle of Copenhagen, the crew of the whaler Faucenberg were among the many seamen from Grimbsby who volunteered to sail to Copenhagen to help bring back the Danish vessels that the Royal Navy had captured.

Year	Tuns whale oil	Year	Tuns whale oil
1801	77	1803	59
1802	29	1804	113
Source	Coltish		

In 1802 Earl Fauconberg was reported to have taken ten whales. She returned to LR in 1803 after an absence of more than a decade. Her master was J. Smith, her owner was Atty & Co., and her trade was Hull–Greenland.

In 1806, Earl Fauconberg collided with Hunter, while both were on their way to Greenland. Hunter had to return to the Humber.

Later, in March 1806, Earl Fauconberg was driven ashore at Aberdeen, Scotland, during a voyage from Grimsby, Lincolnshire, to Greenland. She later was refloated and put into Aberdeen for repairs.

Year	Master	Where	Whales	Tuns whale oil	Seals
1814	Smith	Davis Strait	7	85	
1815	Smith	Greenland	2	28	
1816	Smith	Davis Strait	4	50	
1817	Cooper	Davis Strait	1	20	400
1818	Cooper	Davis Strait	1	15	
1819	Cooper	Davis Strait	11	180	
1820	Cooper	Davis Strait	15	180	
1821	Cooper	Greenland			

Circa 1810 investors formed the Greenland Fishery Company. It had two ships, Birnie and Earl Fauconberg. Birnie, a Spanish prize, was crushed by ice in 1815 Davis Strait. Between 1815 and 1818 Earl Fauconberg gathered only eight whales. The Greenland Fisher Company, including its boiling house and premises, were sold to George Tennyson.

LR for 1821 showed Earl Fauconberg with I.Smith, master, Plaskett, owner, and trade Hull–Davis Strait. She had undergone repairs in 1816 for damages. The RS gave the master's name as Cooper, and the year of the repairs as 1817.

== Fate ==
Earl Fauconberg was sunk by ice off the coast of Greenland in 1821.

After her loss, the Greenland Fishery Company was wound up.
