= Sir Francis Head, 4th Baronet =

Sir Francis Head (1693–1768), 4th Baronet (1721–68) of Head baronets was an Anglican clergyman and landowner, of The [Great] Hermitage, Higham, in Kent. He was the younger brother of Sir Richard Head (1693–1721), 3rd Baronet (1716–21) who died unmarried, and from whom Sir Francis inherited his title.

== Biography ==
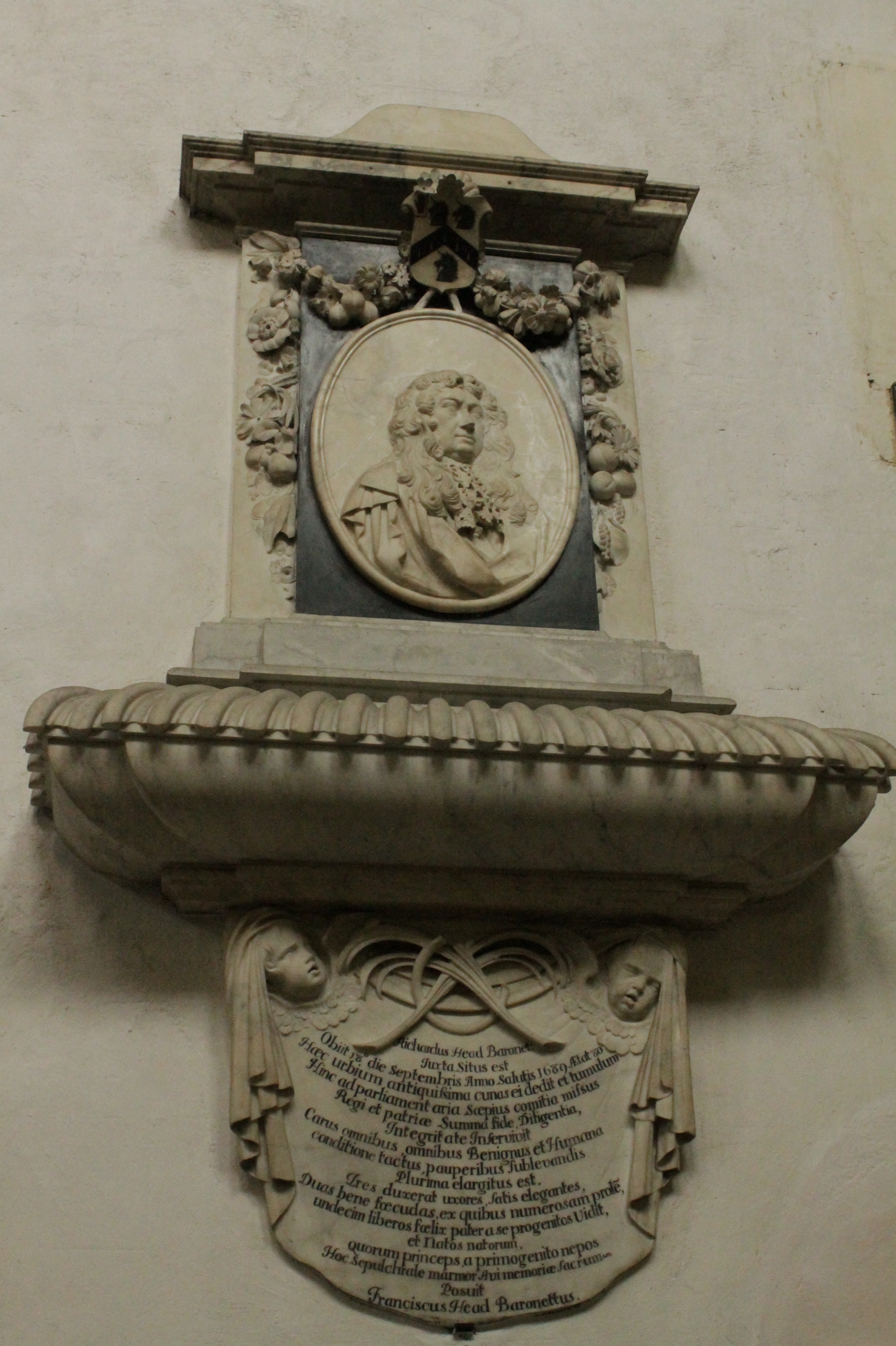
Memorial to Sir Francis Head, Rochester Cathedral

Francis was educated at Christ Church, Oxford University; matriculated 10 October 1712, B.A. 1716, M.A.1719. While at Oxford he was ordained into the Anglican church: deacon 24 May 1719; priest 20 December 1719. As far as we can tell Francis Head never held any clerical position within the Church of England. As a student at Christ Church Francis Head would have known Rev. Francis Atterbury (1663–1732), a prominent Jacobite cleric who was the Dean of Christ Church from 1711–13. Sir Francis Head would have continued an acquaintance with Atterbury who on leaving Oxford had become the Bishop of Rochester (1713–21); the City of Rochester is very close to the Head ancestral seat at Higham,

"a pleasant seat in this parish, situated at almost the south-east extremity of it, about a mile northward from the London road to Dover. It stands on a hill, and commands a most extensive prospect both of the Medway and Thames, the Channel below the Nore, and a vast tract of country both in Kent and Essex. This seat was new built by Sir Francis Head, [4th] bart. who inclosed a park round it (since disparked) and greatly improved the adjoining grounds. He resided here, and died possessed of it, with the manor of Higham Ridgway, and other estates in this parish, in 1768, and was buried in a vault in Higham church.

The Great Hermitage was destroyed by fire in 1938.

Francis Head married Mary Boys (d.1792) by whom he had three daughters:

1. Maria Wilhelmina Head (d.1758). She married Henry Roper (1733–86), 11th Baron Teynham, of a prominent local Catholic family.
2. Anne (var. Ann, Anna) Gabriella Head (d. 1771). She married (1, in 1753) Moses Mendes (d.1759), a wealthy London financier, dilettante poet and playwright; (2, in 1760) Hon. John Roper (1734–80), younger sibling of her brother-in-law Henry Roper. Moses and Anna's son James Roper Mendes Head is father of Sir Francis Bond Head.
3. Elizabeth Campbell Head (1735–1810). She married (1, in 1761) Rev Dr William Lill (c.1721–75), Rector of Ardee in Ireland; (2, in 1798) Captain Sir Charles Ventris Field (d.1803).

Baronetage of England
Preceded by Richard Head	Baronet (of The Hermitage); 1721–1768	Succeeded by John Head
