= Viscount Fauconberg =

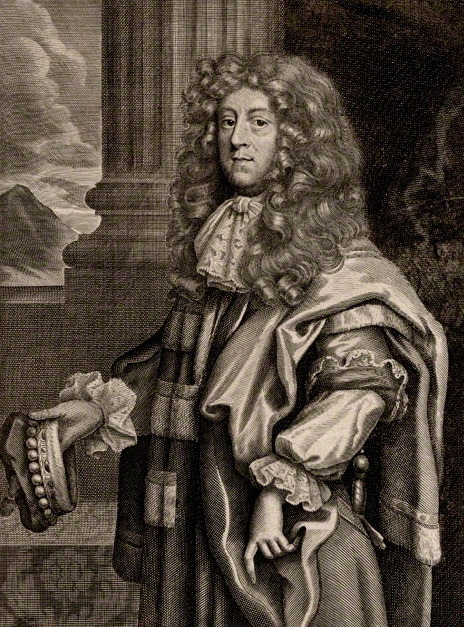
1679 engraving of Thomas Belasyse, 1st Earl Fauconberg

Viscount Fauconberg, of Henknowle in the Bishopric of Durham, was a title in the Peerage of England held by the head of the Belasyse family. This family descended from Sir Henry Belasyse, High Sheriff of Yorkshire from 1603 to 1604, who was created a Baronet, of Newborough in the County of York, in the Baronetage of England in 1611. His son, Sir Thomas, the second Baronet, was created Baron Fauconberg, of Yarm in the County of York, in the Peerage of England in 1627. In 1643 he was further honoured when he was made Viscount Fauconberg, of Henknowle in the Bishopric of Durham, also in the Peerage of England.

He was succeeded by his grandson, Thomas, the second Viscount, the son of Henry Belasyse. Thomas was created Earl Fauconberg in the Peerage of England in 1689. He was childless and the earldom became extinct on his death in 1700. He was succeeded in the remaining titles by his nephew and namesake, Thomas, the third Viscount, the son of Sir Rowland Belasyse. The third Viscount was succeeded by his son, Thomas, the fourth Viscount, who in 1756 was created Earl Fauconberg, of Newborough in the County of York, in the Peerage of Great Britain.

The Earl's son Thomas, the second Earl, had no sons and the earldom became extinct on his death in 1802. He was succeeded in the remaining titles by his second cousin Rowland Belasyse, the sixth Viscount, the grandson and namesake of Rowland Belasyse, younger brother of the third Viscount. The sixth Viscount was succeeded by his younger brother, Charles the seventh Viscount, on whose death in 1815 all the titles became extinct. John Belasyse, second son of the first Viscount, was created Baron Belasyse in 1645. For more information on this branch of the family, see the latter title.

== Belasyse Baronets, of Newborough (1611) ==
- Sir Henry Belasyse, 1st Baronet (1555–1624)
- Sir Thomas Belasyse, 2nd Baronet (1577–1652) (created Baron Fauconberg in 1627 and Viscount Fauconberg in 1643)

== Viscounts Fauconberg of Henknowle (1643) ==
- Thomas Belasyse, 1st Viscount Fauconberg (1577–1652)
  - Henry Belasyse (1604–1647)
- Thomas Belasyse, 2nd Viscount Fauconberg (1628–1700) (created Earl Fauconberg in 1689)

== Earls Fauconberg; First creation (1689) ==
- Thomas Belasyse, 1st Earl Fauconberg (1628–1700)

== Viscounts Fauconberg of Henknowle (1643; Reverted) ==
- Thomas Belasyse, 3rd Viscount Fauconberg (d. 1718)
- Thomas Belasyse, 4th Viscount Fauconberg (1699–1774) (created Earl Fauconberg in 1756)

== Earls Fauconberg, second creation (1756) ==
- Thomas Belasyse, 1st Earl Fauconberg (1699–1774)
- Henry Belasyse, 2nd Earl Fauconberg (1743–1802)

== Viscounts Fauconberg (1643; Reverted) ==
- Rowland Belasyse, 6th Viscount Fauconberg (1745–1810)
- Charles Belasyse, 7th Viscount Fauconberg (1750–1815)

== See also ==
- Baron Fauconberg
- Baron Belasyse
