= Anthony Belasyse =

16th-century English churchman and jurist

Anthony Belasyse, also Bellasis, Bellows and Bellowsesse (died 1552) was an English churchman and jurist, archdeacon of Colchester from 1543.

== Life ==
He was a younger son of Thomas Belasyse of Henknowle, co. Durham. He proceeded bachelor of the civil law in the university of Cambridge in 1520, and was afterwards created LL.D., but it is supposed that he took that degree in a foreign university. In 1528 he was admitted an advocate. On 4 May 1533 he obtained the rectory of Whickham, co. Durham, being collated to it by Bishop Cuthbert Tunstal, who on 7 June following ordained him priest. In the same year he was presented to the vicarage of St. Oswald in the city of Durham. In 1539 he became vicar of Brancepeth in the same county, and about this time he resigned Whickham. His name is subscribed to the decree of convocation, 9 July 1540, declaring the marriage of Henry VIII with Anne of Cleves to have been invalid. Later in the same year he obtained a prebend in the collegiate church of Auckland and a canonry at Westminster.

Edmund Bonner, bishop of London, collated him to the archdeaconry of Colchester on 27 April 1543. He held also the mastership of the hospital of St. Edmund, Gateshead, and had a prebend in the collegiate church of Chester-le-Street. In January 1544 he was installed in the prebend of Heydour-cum-Walton in Lincoln Cathedral. In 1544 he was appointed a master in chancery, and on 17 October in that year he was commissioned with the Master of the Rolls, John Tregonwell, and John Oliver, also masters in chancery, to hear causes in the absence of Thomas Wriothesley, the lord chancellor.

Belasyse became master of Sherburn Hospital, co. Durham, in or about 1545, in which year Henry VIII granted to him, William Belasyse, and Margaret Simpson, the site of Newburgh Priory in Yorkshire, with the demesne, lands, and other hereditaments; also certain manors in Westmorland which had belonged to the dissolved Byland Abbey in Yorkshire. In 1546 he was holding the prebend of Timberscomb in Wells Cathedral, and three years later he was installed prebendary of Knaresborough-cum-Bickhill in York Minster. In January 1552 his name was inserted in a commission by which certain judges and civilians were authorised to assist Bishop Thomas Goodrich of Ely, the lord keeper, in hearing matters of chancery.. It is said that he was one of the council of the north under Edward VI, but this has been disputed. On 7 June 1552 he had a grant from the crown of a canonry in Carlisle Cathedral though he does not appear to have admitted to it, and his death occurred in the following month.

Having largely profited by the dissolution of the monasteries, he left his estates to his nephew, Sir William Belasyse, grandfather of Thomas Belasyse, 1st Viscount Fauconberg.
