= St Oswald's Church, Durham =

Coordinates: 54°46′17″N 1°34′22″W

St. Oswald's Church, Durham
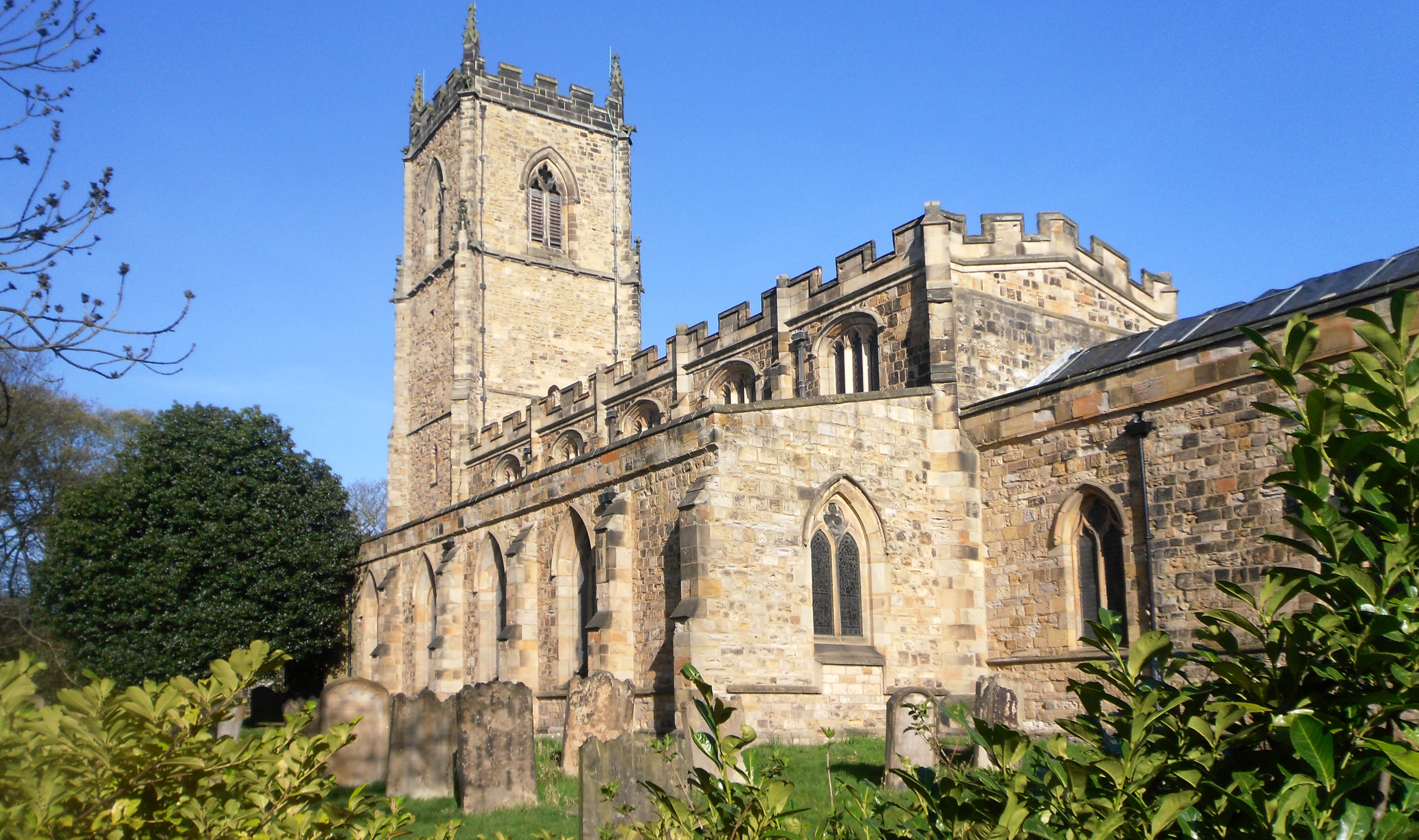
- St. Oswald's from Church Street
- St. Oswald's Church, Durham
- OS grid reference: NZ 27585 41915
- Location: Church Street, Durham, County Durham, DH1 3DG
- Country: England
- Denomination: Church of England
- Previous denomination: Roman Catholic Church
- Churchmanship: Traditional

History
- Status: Active
- Dedication: Oswald of Northumbria

Architecture
- Functional status: Parish church
- Heritage designation: Grade II* listed
- Designated: 6 May 1952
- Years built: Late 12th century

Administration
- Diocese: Diocese of Durham
- Archdeaconry: Archdeaconry of Durham
- Deanery: Durham
- Parish: St. Oswald Durham

Clergy
- Rector: The Revd Peter Kashouris

St. Oswald's Church is a Church of England parish church in Durham, County Durham. The church is a grade II* listed building and it dates in part from the 12th century.

== History ==
The present church dates from the late 12th century, and is likely built on the site of an earlier church. It was rebuilt in 1834 by Ignatius Bonomi. In 1864, Hodgson Fowler rebuilt the tower and the chancel, and added an organ chamber.

The church has stained glass windows. The west window dates from 1864 to 1866 and was designed by Morris & Co with some panels by Ford Madox Brown. Other windows were designed by Kempe and Co., and by Clayton and Bell.

On 6 May 1952, the church was designated a grade II* listed building.

In 1984, the organ and part of the chancel were destroyed by fire. A new organ was built by Peter Collins to the specifications of the organist David Higgins, and installed in a new gallery at the west end of the church. The organ was restored in 2019.

== Present day ==
St. Oswald's Church is part of the benefice of the Three Saints in the Archdeaconry of Durham of the Diocese of Durham, along with Shincliffe St Mary, Coxhoe St. Mary, and Kelloe St. Helen. The church was until recently also used by the Eastern Orthodox Church of St Cuthbert and St Bede, which has now relocated to the former mortuary chapel in Providence Row.

== Notable people ==
- David Higgins, organist and choirmaster from 1974 to 2006
- Will Todd, pianist and composer, who was a choirboy during David Higgins' tenure as choirmaster

=== Notable clergy ===
- Anthony Belasyse, later Archdeacon of Colchester, served as vicar in the middle of the 16th century
- John Bacchus Dykes, served as choirmaster and Vicar from 1862 to his death in 1876, and is buried in the former extension churchyard (now play park) across the road
- Mowbray O'Rorke, later Bishop of Accra, served a curacy here in Durham.
