= Thomas Belasyse, 1st Earl Fauconberg (second creation) =

British courtier (1699–1774)

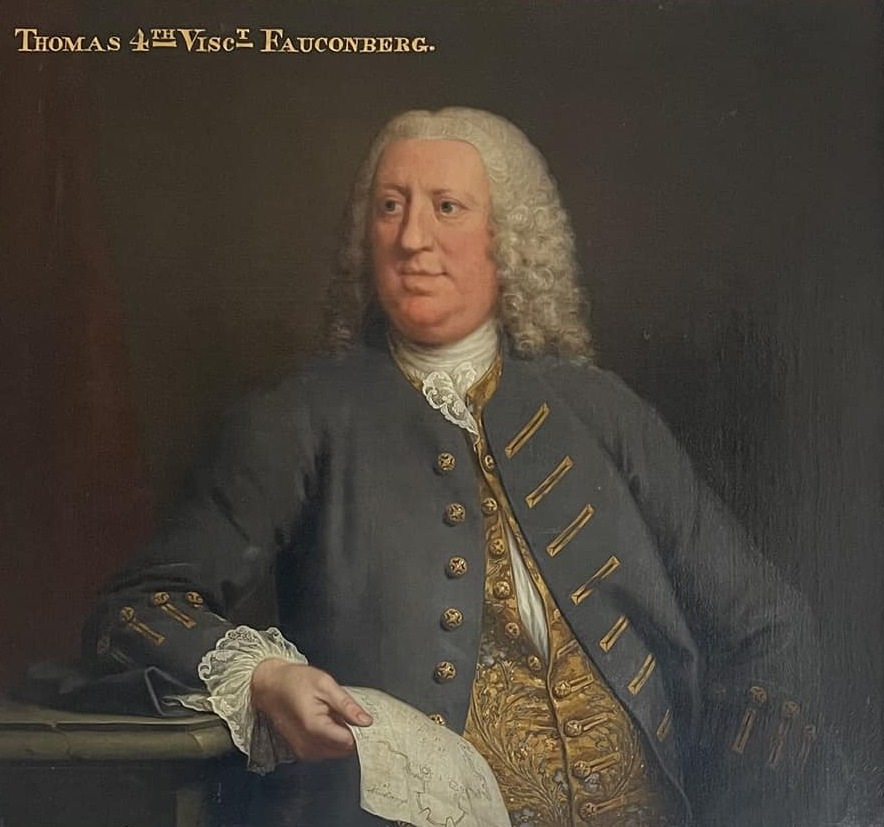
Portrait of Fauconberg by Andrea Soldi

Thomas Belasyse, 1st Earl Fauconberg, PC (27 April 1699 – 8 February 1774) was a British courtier.

Fauconberg was the son and heir of Thomas Belasyse, 3rd Viscount Fauconberg by his wife Bridget Gage, a daughter of Sir John Gage, 4th Baronet. He was raised as a Catholic, but made a public abjuration of the faith and converted to the Church of England. Fauconberg succeeded to his father's viscountcy on 26 November 1718. He served as a Lord of the Bedchamber to George II of Great Britain between 1738 and 1760, and was made a member of the Privy Council. On 16 June 1756, he was created Earl Fauconberg in the Peerage of Great Britain.

Fauconberg married Catherine Betham, the daughter of John Betham, on 5 August 1726. He was succeeded in his titles by his son, Henry.

Peerage of Great Britain
New creation	Earl Fauconberg; 2nd creation 1756–1774	Succeeded by Henry Belasyse
Peerage of England
Preceded by Thomas Belasyse	Viscount Fauconberg; 1st creation 1718–1774	Succeeded by Henry Belasyse
