= Armine Wodehouse =

Armine Wodehouse may refer to:

- Sir Armine Wodehouse, 5th Baronet (c. 1714–1777), MP for Norfolk
- Armine Wodehouse (Liberal politician) (1860–1901), MP for Saffron Walden, descendant of the above
