= Francis Head (cricketer) =

English cricketer (1846–1941)

Francis Somerville Head (30 June 1846 – 2 April 1941) was an English cricketer active from 1868 to 1881 who played for Lancashire. He was born in Kensington and died in Bushey Hall, Hertfordshire. He appeared in seven first-class matches, scoring 80 runs with a highest score of 24 and held three catches.
