= Edward Bellasis (lawyer) =

English lawyer

Edward Bellasis (14 October 1800 – 24 January 1873) was an English lawyer, a follower of the Oxford Movement who converted to Roman Catholicism. He was a close friend and associate of other Anglo-Catholic lawyers Edward Lowth Badeley and James Hope-Scott. His son, also named Edward Bellasis, became an eminent genealogist.

== Biography ==
Edward Bellasis was the son of George Bellasis, a scion of a younger branch of the Belasyse family, and his second wife, Leah Cooper Viall, the daughter and heiress of Emery Viall of Walsingham, Norfolk. His uncle, John Bellasis, and his half-brothers, Joseph and George, won high military honours in India towards the close of the eighteenth century. Edward Bellasis was educated at Christ's Hospital, and made his legal studies at the Inner Temple.

At a relatively early age, Bellasis formed a practice at the Court of Chancery. He also became involved with the Parliamentary Committees, frequently litigating disputes over the large number of new railway lines being built in England at that time. In 1844, he was appointed Serjeant-at-Law.

After the death of a first wife in 1832, Bellasis married Eliza Garnett in 1835. The couple had ten children together; two of their sons, the eldest and youngest, became priests, and three daughters became nuns. One of his sons, also named Edward Bellasis, became an eminent genealogist.

Through his involvement with the Oxford Movement, Bellasis befriended figures including Frederick Oakeley, William George Ward, and John Brande Morris. On 27 December 1850, he was received into the Catholic Church by a Jesuit priest by the name of Brownhill, and his wife and children followed soon after.

Subsequently, Bellaris was involved in a number of Catholic charitable endeavors. He assisted John Henry Newman in founding the Birmingham Oratory, provided scientific equipment for the Stonyhurst Observatory, collected relics for churches, and supported the Sisters of Nazareth. He was also involved in some major legal cases having to do with Catholic figures, such as the 1852 case of Achilli v. Newman, and the litigation over the title and estates of John Talbot, 16th Earl of Shrewsbury. He made frequent private retreats, and occasionally published pamphlets on Catholic topics, as well as a volume of short dialogues collected under the title "Philotheus and Eugenia".

Bellasis retired in 1867, and died on 24 January 1873. Newman, who had dedicated his 1870 Grammar of Assent to Bellasis, described him as "one of the best men I ever knew."
