= Mary Armine =

Learned English gentlewoman and benefactor

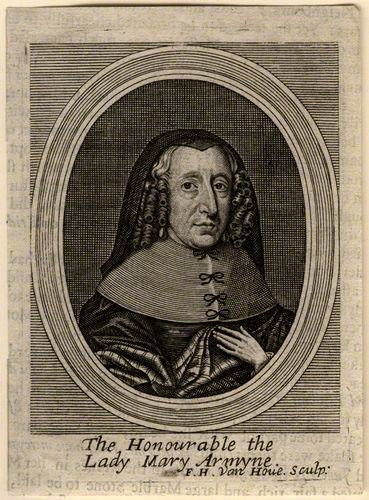
Mary Armine

Lady Mary Armine, Airmine or Armyne (née Talbot) (died 6 March 1676), was a learned English gentlewoman and benefactor.

Mary was the daughter of Henry Talbot, fourth son of George Talbot, 6th Earl of Shrewsbury. Her first husband was Thomas Holcroft, Esq.; her second was Sir William Armyne, baronet, of Osgodby, Lincolnshire. Lady Mary's accomplishments included a good knowledge of French and Latin, and wide reading in divinity and history. Her business capacity is applauded at length by her biographer, and her personal beauty and activity, which characterised her old age no less remarkably than her youth, were frequently commented on by her contemporaries.

She devoted her wealth to many charitable objects. At the time of the "ejection of the two thousand ministers on the fatal Bartholomew day" (1662) she gave £500 "to Mr. Edm. Calamy, to be distributed among the most indigent and necessitous families of them," and the "godly ministers" seldom appealed to her in vain for assistance in pecuniary difficulties. She took a similarly practical interest in the missionaries engaged in converting Native groups in North America. At home, she founded three hospitals, one at Barton Grange in Yorkshire, and by her will left 40l. per annum to be applied to charitable purposes for ninety-nine years. She died 6 March 1676, over eighty years of age. Her portrait was painted by Cornelius Jansen, and is now at Welbeck. An elegy "upon the much-lamented death of the truly honourable, very aged, and singularly pious lady, the Lady Mary Armine" was written by John Sheffield, 1st Duke of Buckingham and Normanby.

== Notes and references ==
Attribution

- This article incorporates text from a publication now in the public domain: Lee, Sidney (1885). "Armine, Mary". In Stephen, Leslie (ed.). Dictionary of National Biography. Vol. 2. London: Smith, Elder & Co. p. 87. DNB article cites:
  - Samuel Clarke's Lives of sundry Eminent Persons in this Late Age (1683);
  - Wilford's Lives of Eminent Persons
  - Granger's Biographical History, iv. p. 175
