= Sir Henry Belasyse, 1st Baronet =

English politician

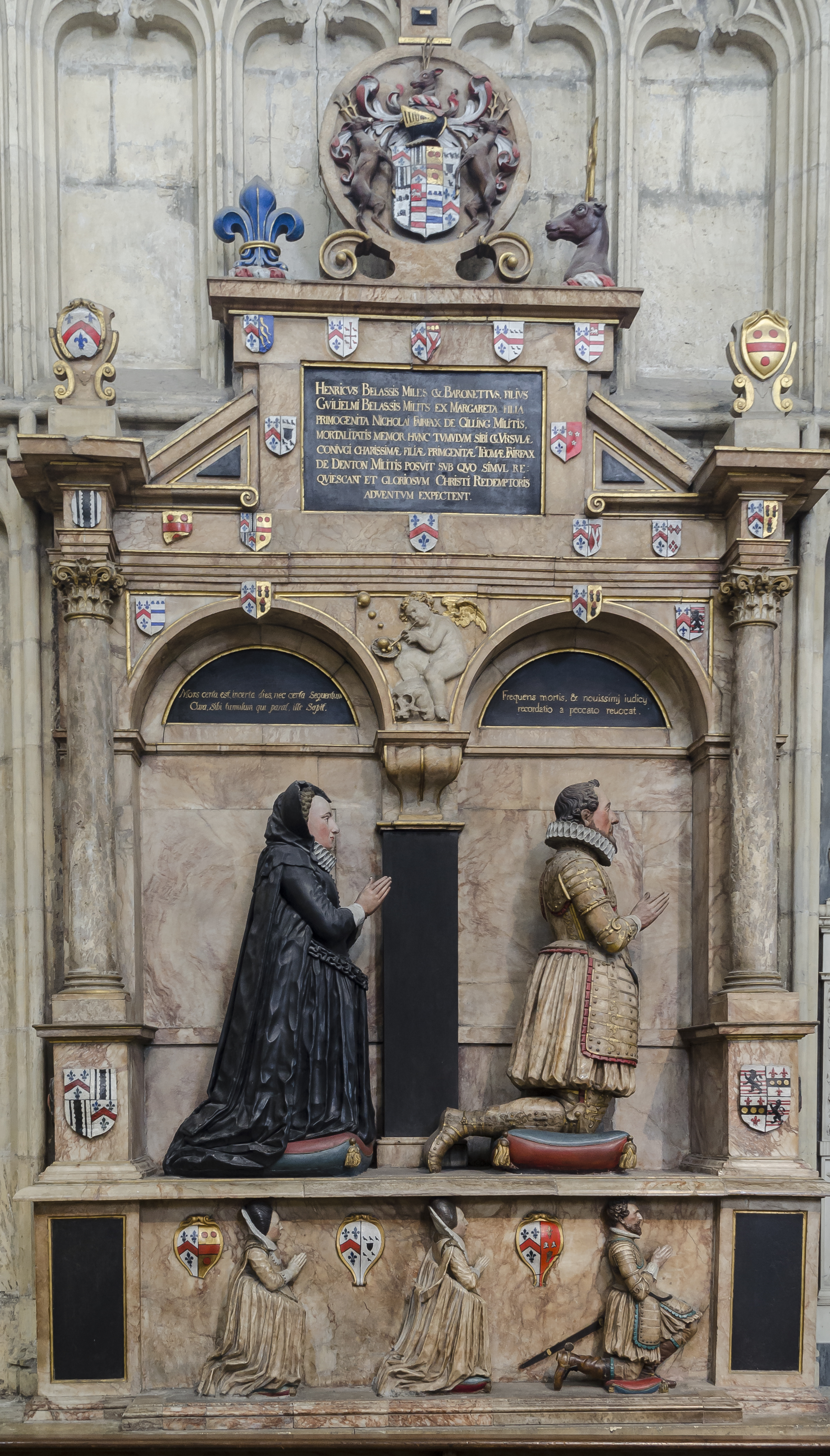
Monument to Sir Henry Belasyse, 1st Baronet, York Minster

Arms of Belasyse: Argent, a chevron gules between three fleurs-de-lys azure

Sir Henry Belasyse, 1st Baronet (1555–1624) was an English politician.

== Origins ==
He was the son of Sir William Bellasis (d.1604) of Newburgh Priory in Yorkshire.

== Career ==
He was educated at Jesus College, Cambridge. He succeeded his father in 1604 and was created a baronet "of Newborough" in 1611.

He was a justice of the peace for the North Riding of Yorkshire c. 1586–7, c. 1594–6 and from 1601 to his death in 1624 and was also a member of the Council of the North from 1603 till death. He was appointed Sheriff of Yorkshire for 1603–04.

He was elected as a member of parliament for Thirsk in 1586, 1589 and 1593. After sitting for Aldborough from 1597 to 1601 he was again elected for Thirsk in 1601.

== Marriage and children ==
He married Ursula Fairfax, a daughter of Sir Thomas Fairfax of Denton, Yorkshire, by whom he had one son and at least one daughter:

- Thomas Belasyse, 1st Viscount Fauconberg, 1st Baron Fauconberg, 2nd Baronet (1577–1652), son and heir, in 1627 created Baron Fauconberg and in 1643 created Viscount Fauconberg "of Henknowle".
- Dorothy Belasyse, who married Conyers Darcy, 7th Baron Darcy de Knayth and whose daughter Mary Darcy married Sir William Lister.

== Death and burial ==
He died in 1624 and was buried at St Saviour's Church, York. His mural monument survives in York Minster.

Parliament of England
Preceded by Sir John Dawney; Robert Bowes	Member of Parliament for Thirsk; 1586–1593; With: Sir John Dawney	Succeeded by Thomas Belasyse; George Leycester
Preceded by Andrew Fisher; Edward Hancock	Member of Parliament for Aldborough; 1597–1598; With: Richard Gargrave	Succeeded by Sir Edward Cecil; Richard Theakston
Preceded by Thomas Belasyse; George Leycester	Member of Parliament for Thirsk; 1601–1593; With: John Mallory	Succeeded by Sir Edward D. Swift; Timothy Whittingham
Baronetage of England
New creation	Baronet (of Newborough); 1611–1624	Succeeded by Thomas Belasyse
