= Sir William Armine, 1st Baronet =

English politician

Sir William Armine, 1st Baronet (11 December 1593 – 10 April 1651) was an English politician who sat in the House of Commons at various times between 1621 and 1651. He supported the Parliamentary cause in the English Civil War. (His name was also spelled Airmine, Armin, Armyne and Armyn.).

== Background ==
Armine was the son of William Armyn (MP) of Osgodby, South Kesteven, Lincolnshire, and his first wife, Martha, daughter of Lord Eure.

== Public life ==
Armine was created a baronet on 28 November 1619 and succeeded to the estates of his father on 22 January 1622. He was elected Member of Parliament for Boston at least in 1624 and possibly in 1621 to replace Sir Thomas Cheek who sat for another seat. In 1625, he was elected MP for Grantham and in 1626 MP for Lincolnshire. He acted as assistant to the managers of the parliamentary impeachment of the Duke of Buckingham in 1626. In 1627, he refused to collect an arbitrary "loan" which the King had attempted to impose on Lincolnshire, and was imprisoned as a result. He was elected MP for Lincolnshire again in 1628 and sat until 1629 when King Charles decided to rule without parliament for eleven years. He was Sheriff of Lincolnshire in 1630 and Sheriff of Huntingdonshire in 1639.

In 1641, Armine was elected MP for Grantham again in the Long Parliament. At the outbreak of the Civil War, he declared for Parliament, and was sent on Parliament's behalf to discuss terms with the King in 1643. He was one of the judges who was elected for the trial of the King in 1649, but refused to sit. He was elected a member of the Council of State in 1649, and was re-elected in 1650 and 1651.

Armine died in 1651 at the age of 57 and was buried at Lavington, otherwise known as Lenton, Lincolnshire, a place adjacent to Osgodby.

== Family ==
Armine married firstly, on 14 December 1619, Elizabeth Hicks, daughter of Sir Michael Hicks of Beverston Castle, Gloucestershire, and of Ruckholte, in Low Leyton, Essex. By her he had children: William (1622–1658) who succeeded to the baronetcy, Theophilus (1623–1644) who became a parliamentary colonel in the civil wars and was killed at Pontefract Castle, Michael (1625–1688) who succeeded his brother to the baronetcy, Elizabeth (1621–1679), who married Sir Thomas Style of Wateringbury and Anne (1624–1671), who married Sir Thomas Barnardiston of Ketton, Suffolk.

Armine married secondly, on 28 August 1628, Mary Holcroft, widow of Thomas Holcroft of Vale Royal Abbey (1557–1620) and daughter of Henry Talbot, son of the Earl of Shrewsbury. She was a philanthropist who founded three hospitals, and also took an active interest in missionaries among Native Americans in England's colonies. By her, Sir William had one further child Talbot Armine (born 1630).

Parliament of England
Preceded by Anthony Irby; Leonard Bawtree	Member of Parliament for Boston; 1621–1624; With: Anthony Irby 1621–1624; William Boswell 1624	Succeeded by Sir Edward Barkham, Bt; William Boswell
Preceded by Sir George Manners; Sir Clement Cotterell	Member of Parliament for Grantham; 1625; With: Sir George Manners	Succeeded by John Wingfield; Edward Stirmin
Preceded by Sir John Wray, Bt; Sir Nicholas Saunderson, Bt	Member of Parliament for Lincolnshire; 1626–1629; With: John Monson 1626; Sir John Wray, 2nd Baronet 1628–1629	Parliament suspended until 1640
Preceded by Thomas Hussey; Henry Pelham	Member of Parliament for Grantham; 1641–1653; With: Henry Pelham 1641–1648	Not represented in Barebones Parliament
Baronetage of England
New creation	Baronet (of Osgodby); 1619–1651	Succeeded by William Armine
