= Moses Mendez =

18th-century English playwright and poet of Jewish descent

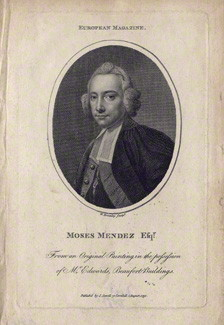
Moses Mendez by William Bromley, published 1792

Moses Mendez, or Mendes, (1690? – 4 February 1758) was a British poet and playwright. It has been suggested that he wrote the anonymous texts for Handel's dramatic English oratorios Solomon and Susanna.

== Life and career ==
Moses Mendez was born to a Jewish family in London. The physician Fernando Mendes was his grandfather. After studies at the University of Oxford he followed his father's choice of career as a stockbroker and became prosperous. Mendez owned an estate called St Andrew's at Old Buckenham in Norfolk. He wrote numerous poems and stage pieces, including the libretti for ballad operas, among them The Double Disappointment and the pastoral piece The Chaplet, produced at leading London theatres Covent Garden and Drury Lane in the 1740s. He also wrote the text for the 1750 ballad opera Robin Hood with music by Charles Burney. It has recently been suggested that Moses Mendez wrote the unattributed texts for Handel's oratorios Susanna and Solomon, both of which had their first performances in 1749.

Mendez was a freemason, having joined the Premier Grand Lodge of England and helped organise their Grand Festival in 1738.

Mendez is mentioned by the writer William Maginn (1794–1842) in his Miscellanies (published posthumously in 1885):

Vain, quite vain, the toil you spend is,
When your time in verse you pass;
For, good Mr. Moses Mendes,
You are nothing but ass

Mendez married Anna Gabriella Head in 1753, but their children (James Roper Mendes Head and Francis Head) would take on the Head surname, after Anna's father died in 1768. His grandson was Sir Francis Bond Head, son of James Roper.

== Works ==
A list of Mendez's works follows:

- [Moses Mendez] (1751). The Seasons. In Imitation of [Edmund] Spenser. London: Printed for S. Baker, at Chaucer’s-Head, in Russel-Street, Covent-Garden. OCLC 518861688.
