= Edward Bellasis (officer of arms) =

English herald

Edward Bellasis (1852–1922) was an English herald who was a long-serving officer of arms at the College of Arms in London. He was the son of another Edward Bellasis, a serjeant-at-law. His heraldic career began in 1873 when he was appointed Bluemantle Pursuivant of Arms in Ordinary. In 1882, he was promoted to the office of Lancaster Herald of Arms in Ordinary. He held this post for forty years until his death in 1922. Bellasis used a coat of arms inherited from his father. The arms were blazoned Argent a Chevron between three Fleurs-de-lis Azure in chief a Tent Purpure lined Gules.

== Publications ==
- Bellasis, Edward. Memorial of Mr. Serjeant Bellasis (2d ed., London, 1895).

== See also ==
- Heraldry
- Pursuivant
- Herald
