= John Belasyse, 1st Baron Belasyse =

English nobleman and soldier

The Right Honourable The Lord Belasyse PC
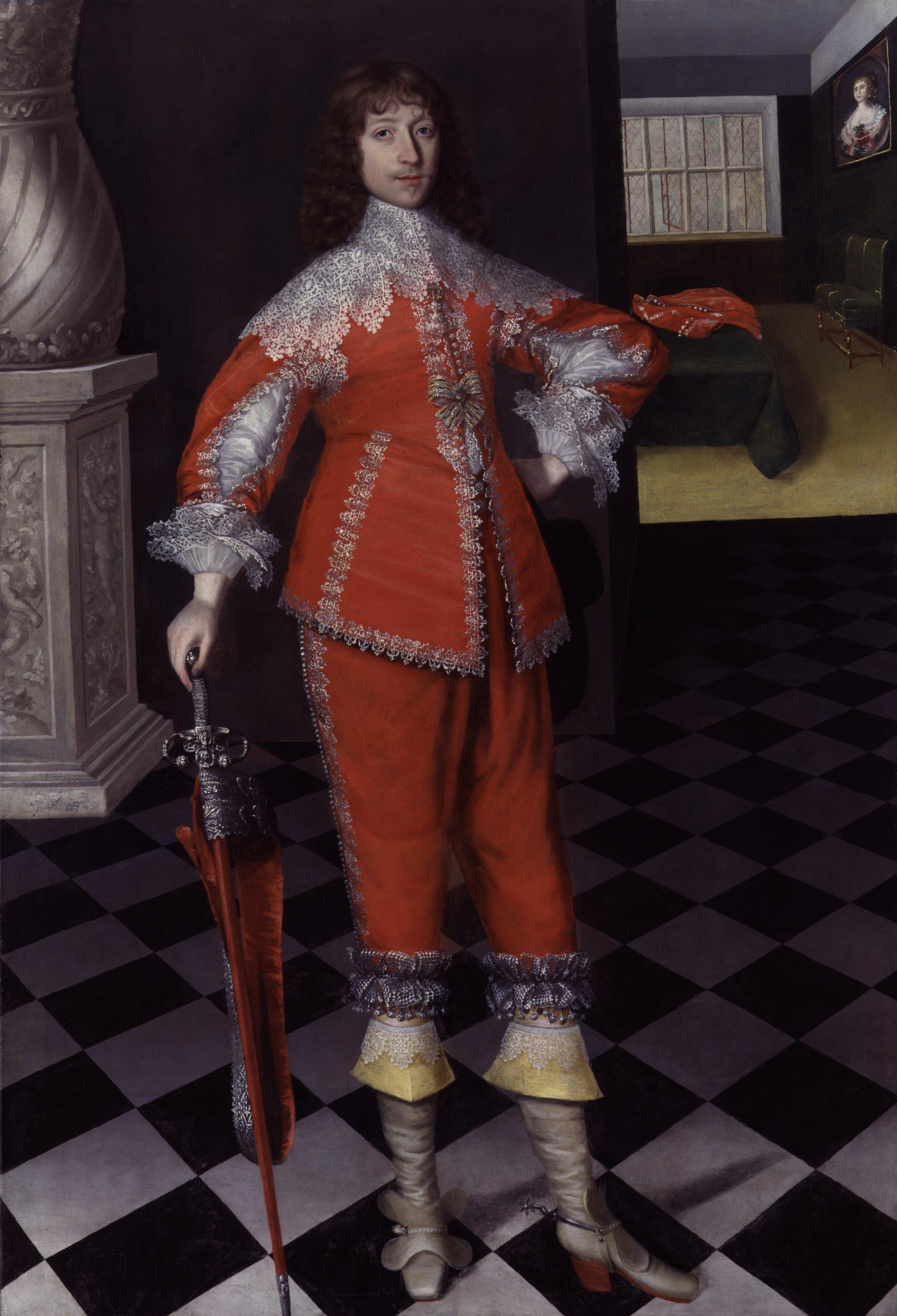
- Portrait by Gilbert Jackson, 1636

First Lord of the Treasury
- In office 4 January 1687 – 9 April 1689
- Preceded by: Laurence Hyde, 1st Earl of Rochester (as Lord High Treasurer)
- Succeeded by: Charles Mordaunt, 1st Earl of Monmouth

Personal details
- Born: John Belasyse; 24 June 1614 Newburgh Grange, Yorkshire
- Died: 10 September 1689 (aged 75) Whitton, Middlesex
- Resting place: St Giles in the Fields, London
- Children: 16, including Henry

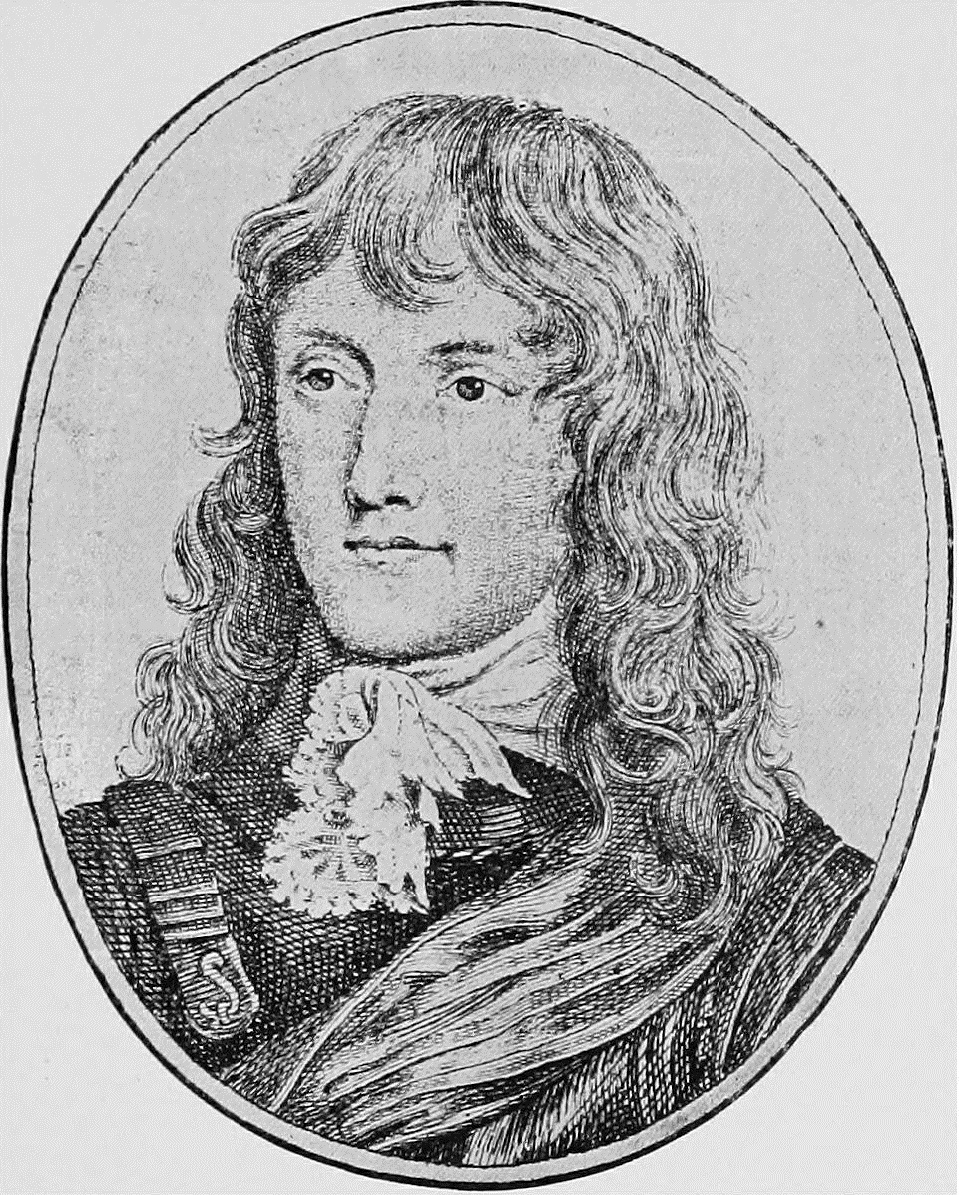
John Belasyse

Arms of Belasyse: Argent, a chevron gules between three fleurs-de-lys azure

John Belasyse, 1st Baron Belasyse (or Bellasis) PC (24 June 1614 – 10 September 1689) was an English nobleman, Royalist officer and Member of Parliament, notable for his role during and after the Civil War. (Note: Also spelt in other sources as John Bellasis, 1st Baron Bellasis and in Pepys's diary Lord Bellasses) He suffered a long spell of imprisonment during the Popish Plot, although he was never brought to trial. From 1671 until his death he lived in Whitton, near Twickenham in Middlesex. Samuel Pepys was impressed by his collection of paintings, which has long since disappeared.

== Origins ==
He was born at Newburgh Grange, Yorkshire and was baptised on 24 July 1614 at Coxwold, Yorkshire. He was the second son of Thomas Belasyse, 1st Viscount Fauconberg (1577–1652), a Member of Parliament for Thirsk in the Short and Long Parliaments, by his wife Barbara Cholmondeley, a daughter of Sir Henry Cholmondeley of Roxby in Yorkshire.

== Career ==
=== Civil War ===
Shortly after the start of the Civil War, he was "disabled" from sitting in the Long Parliament as he had joined the Royalist cause. He raised six regiments of horse and foot soldiers at his own expense and took part in the Battle of Edgehill and the Battle of Brentford, both in 1642, the First Battle of Newbury (1643), the Battle of Selby (1644), the Battle of Naseby (1645), as well as the sieges of Reading (1643), Bristol and Newark and was wounded several times. He later became Lieutenant-General of the King's forces in the North of England, and Governor of York and of Newark. At Oxford on 27 January 1645 he was raised to the peerage by King Charles I under the title of Baron Belasyse of Worlaby, Lincolnshire.

On 4 February 1665 Samuel Pepys recorded an anecdote about Belasyse's civil war activities in a diary entry:

To my office, and there all the morning. At noon, being invited, I to the Sun behind the Change to dinner to my Lord Bellasses – where a great deal of discourse with him – and some good. Among other at table, he told us a very handsome passage of the King's sending him his message about holding out the town of Newarke, of which he was then governor for the King. This message he sent in a Slugg-bullet, being writ in Cypher and wrapped up in lead and swallowed. So the messenger came to my Lord and told him he had a message from the King, but it was yet in his belly; so they did give him some physic, and out it came. This was a month before the King's flying to the Scotts; and therein he told him that at such a day, being 3 or 6 May, he should hear of his being come to the Scotts, being assured by the King of France that in coming to them, he should be used with all the Liberty, Honour and safety that could be desired. And at the just day he did come to the Scotts. He told us another odd passage: how the King, having newly put out Prince Rupert of his Generallshipp upon some miscarriage at Bristol, and Sir Rd. Willis of his governorshipp of Newarke at the entreaty of the gentry of the County, and put in my Lord Bellasses – the great officers of the King’s Army mutinyed, and came in that manner, with swords drawn, into the market-place of the town where the King was – which the King hearing, says, "I must to horse". And there himself personally, when everybody expected they would have been opposed, the King came and cried to the head of the Mutineers, which was Prince Rupert, "Nephew, I command you to be gone!" So the Prince, in all his fury and discontent, withdrew, and his company scattered – which they say was the greatest piece of mutiny in the world.

— Samuel Pepys, 4 February 1665

=== Interregnum ===
Belasyse is considered to have been one of the first members of the Sealed Knot, a Royalist underground organisation, as was Sir Richard Willis, his predecessor as Governor of Newark. During the Interregnum Belasyse was in frequent communication with King Charles II and his supporters in Holland.

=== Charles II ===
After the Restoration of the Monarchy, Belasyse was appointed Lord-Lieutenant of the East Riding of Yorkshire (1660–1673) and Governor of Kingston upon Hull (1661–1673), while from 1665 to 1666 he held the posts of Governor of Tangier and Captain-General of the forces in Africa. According to Samuel Pepys, he accepted the post only for the profit it brought. In 1666/67, Belasyse was in England; his appointment as Governor of Tangier was withdrawn and he was appointed Captain of the Gentlemen-at-Arms. In 1672, he resigned this appointment as he was unwilling to take the Oath of Conformity introduced under the Test Act.

==== Popish Plot ====
At the time of the plot of Titus Oates, Belasyse, along with four other Catholic peers, Henry Arundell, 3rd Baron Arundell of Wardour, William Howard, 1st Viscount Stafford, William Herbert, 1st Marquis of Powis and William Petre, 4th Baron Petre, was denounced as a conspirator and formally impeached in Parliament.

Belasyse was said to have been designated Commander-in-Chief of a supposed "Popish army" by the Jesuit Superior-General, Giovanni Paolo Oliva, but Charles II, according to Von Ranke, burst out laughing at the idea that this infirm old man, who could hardly stand on his feet due to gout, would be able even to hold a pistol.

He was a friend of the senior civil servant Edward Colman, an ardent and politically active Catholic, who was executed for his supposed part in the Plot in December 1678, and Colman visited Belasyse the night before he gave himself up to the authorities. However, Colman in fact seems to have been guilty of nothing more than indiscreet correspondence with the French Court in which he outlined his wildly impractical schemes for the advancement of the Catholic faith in England. On the other hand, Coleman plainly advocated foreign bribery of the King to ensure a dissolution of Parliament.

Despite his frequent references to his old age and infirmity, Lord Belasyse lived on for another ten years. The impeached Catholic peers, though they endured a long imprisonment in the Tower, where Lord Petre died in 1683, were never brought to trial, apart from Stafford, who was executed in December 1680.

=== James II ===
Following the accession of king James II, Belasyse returned to favour and in July 1686 was appointed a Privy Counsellor and in 1687 was appointed as First Lord Commissioner of the Treasury which, on account of his Catholicism, caused political problems for the king, although in a Court dominated by extremists, he was regarded as moderate. He and the king had always been on friendly terms: after the death of his first wife Anne Hyde, James had informally promised to marry Susan Belasyse, Belasyse's widowed daughter-in-law, "a lady of much life and vivacity", despite the fact that she was a staunch Protestant while he was a Catholic convert. The marriage was forbidden by Charles II, who told his younger brother that "it was too much that he had played the fool once (i.e. by marrying Anne Hyde, another commoner) and that it was not to be done a second time and at such an age". Susan was forced to surrender the written proofs of the engagement although she kept a secret copy.

== Marriages and children ==
Belasyse married three times and by his first and third wives had at least sixteen children, many of whom died in infancy. His wives were as follows:

- Firstly he married Jane Boteler, a daughter of Sir Robert Boteler by his wife Frances Drury, by whom he had issue:
  - Sir Henry Belasyse (died 1667), only surviving son and heir, who married his step-sister Susan Armine (died 1713), a daughter of Sir William Armine, 2nd Baronet, by his wife Anne Crane. Unlike her husband's family, she was a Protestant. Henry predeceased his father, having been killed in a duel in 1667 following a drunken quarrel with the dramatist Thomas Porter (described by Samuel Pepys as "the silliest, most trivial quarrel imaginable"), and the title passed to his son Henry Belasyse, 2nd Baron Belasyse (died 1691), who died with no sons, whereby the title became extinct. Unusually, in her widowhood Susan was created Baroness Belasyse of Osgodby in her own right in 1674, which title expired on her death. After King Charles II had firmly vetoed her as a wife for his brother James, she remarried James Fortrey.
- Secondly he married Anne Crane (d.1662), a daughter of Sir Robert Crane, 1st Baronet, by his second wife Susan Alington, and widow of Sir William Armine, 2nd Baronet (1622–1658).
- Thirdly he married Anne Paulet, a daughter of John Paulet, 5th Marquis of Winchester, by his second wife Honora de Burgh.

=== Daughters ===
He had seven surviving daughters, by his first and third wives:

- Isabel Belasyse, who married Thomas Stonor
- Mary Belasyse, who married Robert Constable, 3rd Viscount of Dunbar. Samuel Pepys records meeting Mary Belasyse, later Lady Dunbar, in 1666, and was charmed by her passion for music: "the greatest I ever saw in my life".
- Barbara Belasyse, who married Sir John Webbe, 3rd Baronet
- Honora Belasyse, who married George Nevill, 12th Baron Bergavenny
- Catherine Belasyse, who married John Talbot
- Anne Belasyse
- Elizabeth Belasyse (died 1699)

== Death and burial ==
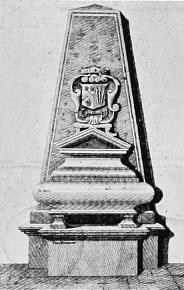
Monument to Lord Belasyse in the old Church of St Giles in the Fields, London, showing the arms of Belasyse impaling Paulet, for his 3rd wife. This monument was destroyed during the rebuilding of the present Georgian church.

He died on 10 September 1689 and was buried on 14 September 1689 at the church of St Giles in the Fields, London. A monument erected to his memory in the old Church was moved to the churchyard when the present Georgian church was built and subsequently decayed, but the inscribed tablet survives now in the south porch, reading as follows:

This Monument was Erected in the Year of Our Lord 1736. by the Pious Direction of the Honourable/Dame barbara webb wife of Sr. John Webb of Canford Magna in the County of Dorset Bart. and the Honourable/catherine talbot wife of the Honourable john talbot of Longford in the County of Salop Esq. Surviveing/Daughters and Coheirs of the Right Honourable john Lord belasyse Second Son of thomas Lord Viscount fauconberg, in memory of their most dear Father his wives and Children. Who for his Loyalty Prudence and Courage was promoted to Several Commands of great Trust by their/Majesty's King Charles the First and Second (Viz.) Having raised Six Regiments of Horse and Foot in the late Civil Wars/He commanded a Tertia in his Majesty's Armies att the Battles of Edge Hill, Newbury, and Knaseby, ye Seiges of Reading/and Bristol. Afterwards being made Governour of York and Commander in Chief of all his Majesty's Forces in/Yorkshire, He fought the Battle of Selby with the Lord Fairfax, then being Lieutenant General of ye Countys of Lincoln,/Nottingham, Darby, and Rutland, and Governour of Newark. He Valiantly defended that Garrison against the English/ and Scotch Armies, till his Majesty Came in Person to the Scotch Quarters and Commanded the surrender of it./At which time he also had the honour of being General of the Kings Horse Guards. in all which Services dureing/ the Wars and other Atchievements, he deported himself with eminent Courage & Conduct & received many wounds/Sustained Three Imprisonments in the Tower of London, and after the Happy Restauration of King charles the second/He was made Lord Lieutenant of the East Rideing of the County of York, Governour of Hull, General of His Majesty's/ Forces in Africa, Governour of Tangier, Captain of his Majesty's Guards of Gentlemen Pensioners, & First Lord/Commissioner of the Treasury to King james the Second. He dyed the 10th day of September 1689. whose remaines/are deposited in this Vault./ He married to his first wife jane daughter and Sole Heiress of Sr. robert boteler of woodhall in the/County of Hertford, Knt. by whom he had Sr. henry belasyse Knt. of the most Honourable Order of the Bath/interr'd in this Vault, mary Viscountess dunbar, and frances both Deceased/ He married to his second Wife ann Daughter and Coheir to Sr. robert crane of Chilton in ye County/of Suffolk Bart. who also lyes interr'd here. He married to his third Wife the Right Honourable the Lady ann powlet Second Daughter of the/Right Noble john Marquiss of Winchester, sister to charles late Duke of Bolton, and is here interr'd, the/Issue by that Marriage as above.

== Notes ==
Political offices
Preceded by The Earl of Rochester	First Lord of the Treasury; 1687–1688	Succeeded by The Earl of Monmouth
Military offices
Preceded by Charles Fairfax	Governor of Kingston-upon-Hull; 1661–1673	Succeeded by The Duke of Monmouth
Preceded by John Fitzgerald	Governor of Tangier; 1665–1666	Succeeded by Henry Norwood
Honorary titles
English Interregnum	Lord Lieutenant of the East Riding of Yorkshire; 1660–1673	Succeeded by The Duke of Monmouth
Preceded by The Earl of Cleveland	Captain of the Gentlemen Pensioners; 1667–1672	Succeeded by The Viscount Fauconberg
Peerage of England
New creation	Baron Belasyse; 1645–1689	Succeeded by Henry Belasyse
