= Henry Belasyse (died 1667) =

English army officer and Member of the Parliament of England

Sir Henry Belasyse KB (c. 1639 – August 1667) was an English army officer and Member of the Parliament of England. He was killed in a duel after a trivial quarrel with a friend, a tragedy which gave rise to much public comment.

== Biography ==
He was the only surviving son of John Belasyse, 1st Baron Belasyse and his first wife Jane Boteler, daughter of Sir Robert Boteler. Belasyse was captain of foot in the garrison of Hull in 1660–1662 and from 1665 to his death, as well as holding a lieutenant's commission for a few months during 1666 in the Duke of Buckingham's Regiment of Horse.

He was made a Knight of the Bath in 1661. In November 1666 was elected to Parliament for Great Grimsby, Lincolnshire. Nine months later he was killed in a duel following a drunken quarrel with a close friend, the dramatist Thomas Porter. Samuel Pepys described the episode at length in his Diary, and commented that it was the silliest and most trivial quarrel imaginable: "the world doth talk of them as a couple of fools".

== Family ==
He married Susan, daughter and co-heiress of Sir William Armine, 2nd Baronet, and Anne Crane: they had one son, Henry. Unlike her husband, Susan was a Protestant. She was described as a lady of great life and vivacity, but very little beauty.

Susan was created Baroness Belasyse of Osgodby for life in 1674, and their son Henry succeeded his grandfather as second and last Baron Belasyse of Worlaby in 1689. Susan remarried James Fortrey and died in 1713, having outlived her only son by many years. In her last years, she was much troubled by lawsuits.

After the death of his first wife Anne Hyde. in 1671, the future James II was privately pledged to marry Susan, but his brother Charles II forbade the marriage and Susan was bullied into surrendering the written proofs of the engagement, although it is said that she managed to retain copies of the relevant papers.

== Notes ==
Parliament of England
Preceded by Adrian Scrope; Gervase Holles	Member of Parliament for Great Grimsby; 1666–1667; With: Gervase Holles	Succeeded by Gervase Holles; Sir Philip Tyrwhitt, Bt
