= Sir William Armine, 2nd Baronet =

English politician

Sir William Armine, 2nd Baronet (14 July 1622 – 2 January 1658) was an English politician who sat in the House of Commons from 1646 to 1653.

Armine was born at Ruckholt, in Low Leyton parish, Becontree hundred, Essex, the son of Sir William Airmine, 1st Baronet and his first wife, Elizabeth Hicks, daughter of Sir Michael Hicks, of Beverstone Castle, Gloucestershire, and of Ruckholt, in Low Leyton, Essex. He was admitted to Gray's Inn on 18 November 1639. He served as commissioner of parliament for the Scots in 1643.

In March 1646, he was elected Member of Parliament for Cumberland as a recruiter to the Long Parliament. He succeeded to the baronetcy on the death of his father on 10 April 1651.

== Family ==
Armine married Anne Crane, daughter of Sir Robert Crane, 1st Baronet of Chilton, Suffolk and his second wife Susan Alington, at Chilton on 26 August 1649. They had two surviving daughters, Susan and Anne.

- Susan married Lord Belasyse's only son, Sir Henry Belasyse (died 1667) by his first wife Jane Boteler: her husband predeceased his father, leaving a son Henry, 2nd Baron. In 1674 Susan was created Baroness Belasyse of Osgodby in her own right. She remarried James Fortrey of Fortreys Hall, Cambridgeshire, who outlived her. As her son predeceased her, her title became extinct on her death in 1713. She was described as a woman of much life and vivacity, but very little beauty. The future James II of England was informally engaged to her after his first wife's death, but his brother Charles II of England forbade the marriage, on the ground that James had already damaged the monarchy by marrying a non-royal wife, Anne Hyde. Charles told his brother that "it was too much that he had played the fool once, and it was not to be done a second time."
- Anne married firstly Sir Thomas Wodehouse, by whom she had at least two children, including Sir John Wodehouse, 4th Baronet. She married secondly Thomas Crew, 2nd Baron Crew, by whom she had four daughters. She married thirdly Arthur Herbert, 1st Earl of Torrington. She died in 1719.

Lady Armine remarried as his second wife John Belasyse, 1st Baron Belasyse, and died in 1662.

Armine died in London at the age of 36 and was buried on 17 January 1658 at Lenton, Lincolnshire. He had no son and the baronetcy passed to his brother Michael.

Parliament of England
Preceded by Unrepresented since March 1643	Member of Parliament for Cumberland; 1646–1653; With: Richard Tolson 1646–1648	Succeeded by Not represented in the Barebones Parliament
Baronetage of England
Preceded by William Armine	Baronet (of Osgodby); 1651–1658	Succeeded by Michael Armine
