= Thomas Belasyse, 1st Earl Fauconberg =

English military officer and diplomat

The Right Honourable The Earl Fauconberg PC
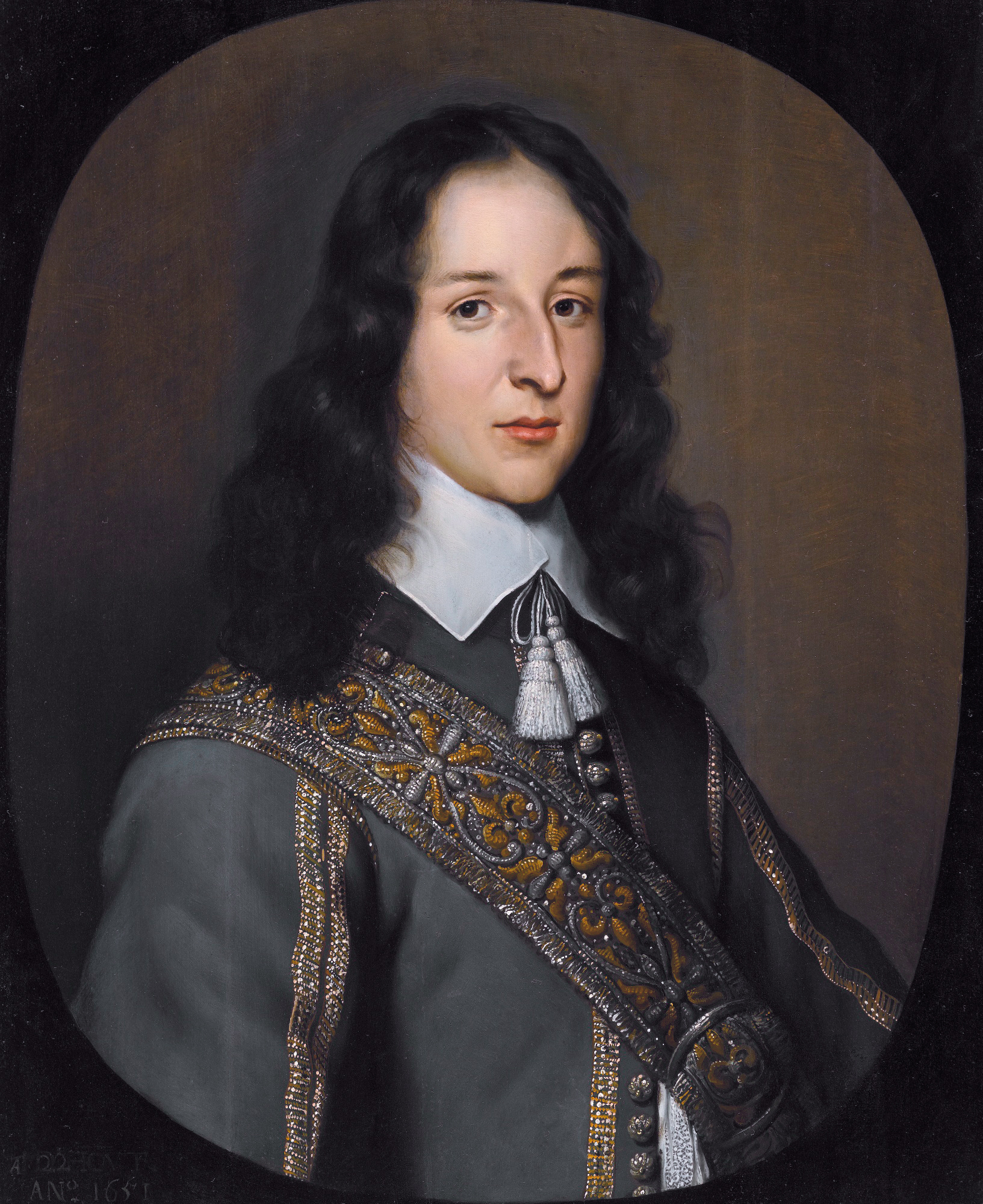
- Portrait by M. D. Hout, 1651

Lord Lieutenant, North Riding
- In office 1660–1687
- Monarch: Charles II James II

Envoy to the Republic of Venice
- In office 1669–1672
- Monarch: Charles II

Special Envoy to France
- In office 1658–1659
- Monarch: Commonwealth of England

Personal details
- Born: c. 1627 Newburgh Priory, Yorkshire
- Died: 31 December 1700 (aged 73) Sutton House, London
- Resting place: St Michael's, Coxwold
- Spouse(s): Mildred Saunderson; Mary Cromwell (1637–1713)
- Parent(s): Henry Belasyse (1604–1647); Grace Barton
- Education: Trinity College, Cambridge
- Occupation: Politician, diplomat

Thomas Belasyse, 1st Earl Fauconberg PC (c. 1627 – 31 December 1700) was an English military officer and diplomat. He supported the Parliamentary cause during the English Civil War, becoming closely associated with Oliver Cromwell and marrying Cromwell's third daughter, Mary Cromwell. After the Restoration of the monarchy, he became a member of the Privy Council under Charles II and was created an earl by William of Orange.

== Early life ==
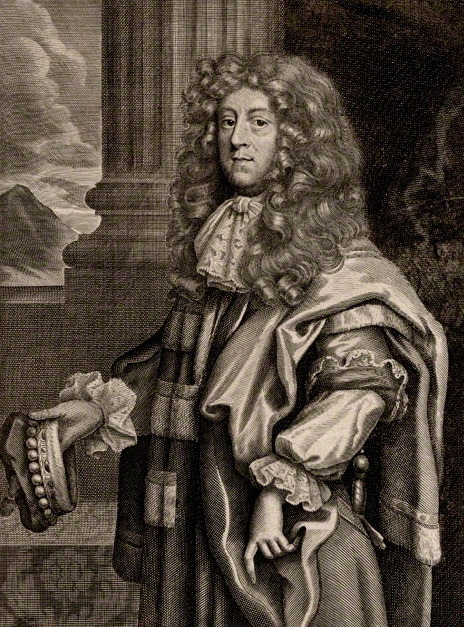
1679 engraving of Fauconberg

Belasyse was the eldest surviving son of Henry Belasyse and Grace Barton; His grandfather, Thomas Belasyse, was a Royalist who went into exile after the defeat at the Marston Moor in 1644.

Unlike his Royalist father and grandfather, Belasyse supported Parliament during the English Civil War and subsequently became a strong adherent of Oliver Cromwell. He married Cromwell's third daughter, Mary, in 1657. His father died in 1647, and he succeeded his grandfather as Viscount Fauconberg in the Bishopric of Durham in 1652.

== Career ==
Belasyse aligned himself with the Royalist cause at the time of the Restoration of the monarchy. He was appointed a member of the Privy Council of England by Charles II and Captain of the Guard, succeeding his uncle The Lord Belasyse in the latter office. He also served as English ambassador in Venice. He was Lord Lieutenant of the North Riding of Yorkshire from 1660 to 1692, with responsibility for the North York Militia, personally commanding one of the Troops of Horse. He was among the noblemen who invited William of Orange to England, and was created Earl Fauconberg, in the Peerage of England, by that king on 9 April 1689.

Fauconberg died on 31 December 1700 and was buried in the family vault in Coxwold. He had no children;; on his death, the earldom became extinct, but his viscountcy passed to his nephew, Thomas Belasyse.

== Family ==
On 3 July 1651, Fauconberg married Mildred, daughter of Nicholas Saunderson, 2nd Viscount Castleton. She died on 8 May 1656. On 18 November 1657, he married Mary Cromwell, the third daughter of Oliver Cromwell. She outlived her husband by thirteen years, dying on 14 March 1713.

== Bibliography ==
While in Italy, Fauconberg translated and published the Histoire du gouvernement de Venise, by Abraham Nicolas Amelot de la Houssaye.

== Arms ==
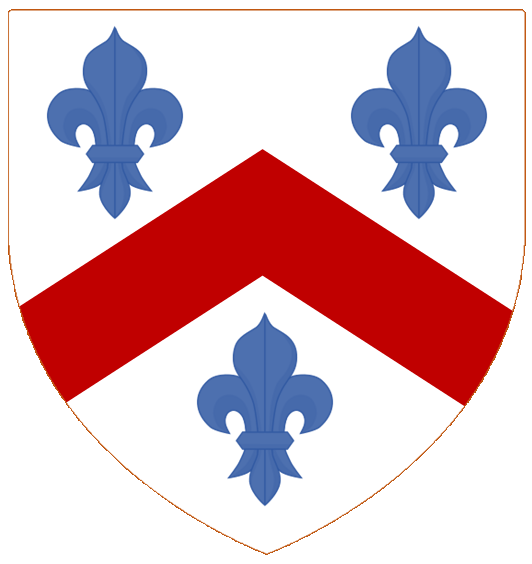

== See also ==
- Green Ribbon Club, a post-Restoration political club of which Fauconberg was a member. The Green Ribbon had been used as the badge of the Levellers in the English Civil Wars, in which many of them had fought, serving as an overt reminder of their radical origins.
- Earl Fauconberg (1765 ship) – a ship built at Whitby that became a Greenland whaler and was lost there in 1821.

== Sources ==
- Stater, Victor (2004). "Belasyse, Thomas, first Earl Fauconberg". Oxford Dictionary of National Biography (online ed.). Oxford University Press. doi:10.1093/ref:odnb/1978. (Subscription, Wikipedia Library access or UK public library membership required.)
- Grant, Peter, "Belasyse [née Cromwell], Mary, Countess Fauconberg (bap. 1637, d. 1713)", Oxford University Press 2004–2008, Bellasis family 1500–1653, page 7. Website of Ingilby History, Retrieved 5 March 2010.
- Nicolas, Sir Nicholas Harris & Courthope, William. The historic peerage of England: exhibiting, under alphabetical arrangement, the origin, descent, and present state of every title of peerage which has existed in this country since the Conquest; being a new edition of the "Synopsis of the Peerage of England", John Murray, 1857.
- Sherwood, Roy Edward (1997). Oliver Cromwell: king in all but name, 1653–1658. Palgrave Macmillan. ISBN 0-312-17659-7.

Honorary titles
English Interregnum	Lord Lieutenant of Durham; 1660–1661	Succeeded by John Cosin
English Interregnum	Lord Lieutenant of the North Riding of Yorkshire; 1660–1687	Succeeded by The Viscount Fairfax of Emley
English Interregnum	Custos Rotulorum of the North Riding of Yorkshire; 1660–1700	Succeeded by The Earl of Burlington
Preceded by The Lord Belasyse	Captain of the Gentleman Pensioners; 1672–1676	Succeeded by The Earl of Roscommon
Preceded by The Duke of Newcastle-upon-Tyne	Lord Lieutenant of the North Riding of Yorkshire; 1689–1692	Succeeded by The Marquess of Carmarthen
Peerage of England
New title	Earl Fauconberg; 1689–1700	Extinct
Preceded by Thomas Belasyse	Viscount Fauconberg; 1652–1700	Succeeded by Thomas Belasyse
