= Francis Bond Head =

Lt. Governor of Upper Canada (1836–1838)

The Right Honourable Sir Francis Bond Head Bt KCH
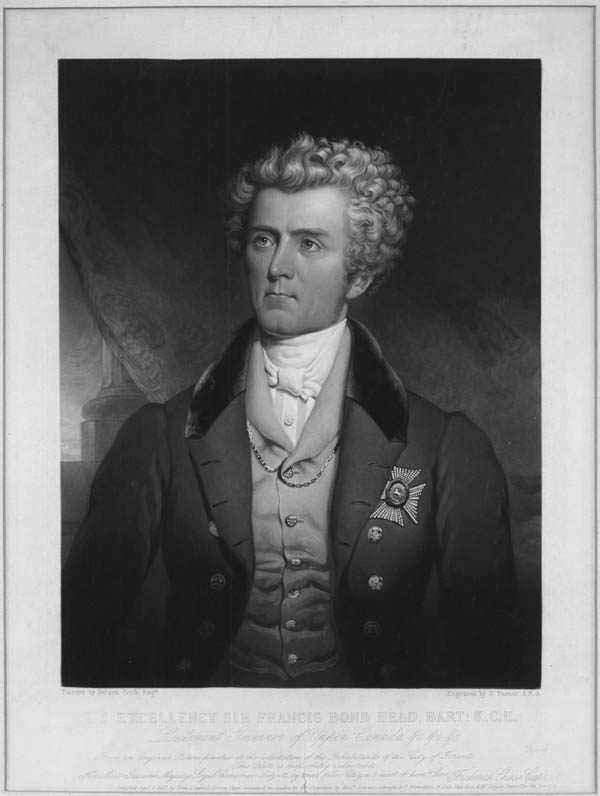

6th Lieutenant Governor of Upper Canada
- In office 1836–1838
- Monarchs: William IV; Victoria
- Preceded by: Sir John Colborne
- Succeeded by: Sir George Arthur

Personal details
- Born: 7 December 1793 Higham, Kent
- Died: 20 July 1875 (aged 82) Croydon, United Kingdom
- Spouse: Julia Valenza Somerville
- Profession: Commissioned Lieutenant in the Royal Engineers

Sir Francis Bond Head, 1st Baronet KCH PC (7 December 1793 – 20 July 1875) was Lieutenant-Governor of Upper Canada during the rebellion of 1837.

== Biography ==
Head was an officer in the corps of Royal Engineers of the British Army from 1811 to 1825; as such he earned a Waterloo Medal. Afterwards, he attempted to set up a mining company in Argentina. Head rode between Buenos Aires and the Andes twice, from which he was given the nickname "Galloping Head".

Head was born to parents, James Roper Mendes Head and Frances Anne Burgess. He was descended from the Spanish Jew Fernando Mendes, who accompanied as her personal physician Catherine of Braganza in 1662 when she came to England to marry Charles II. His grandfather Moses Mendes married Anna Gabriella Head and took on the Head name following the death of his wife's father, Sir Francis Head, 4th Bt. He married Julia Valenza Somerville in 1816, and they eventually had four children.

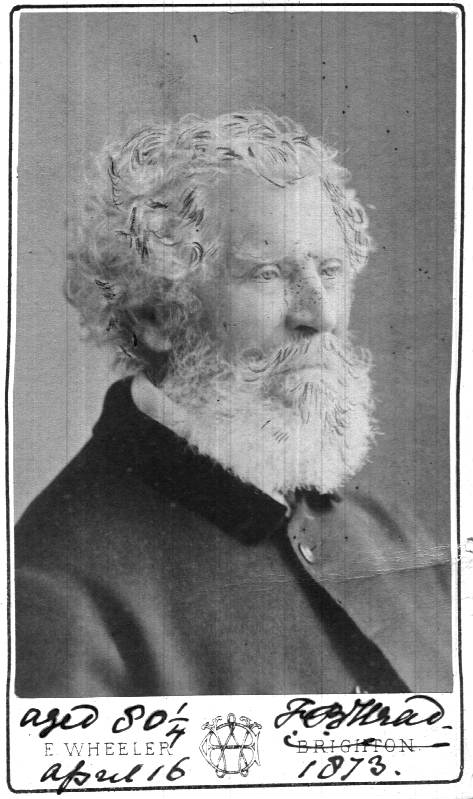
Sir Francis Bond Head in 1873, aged 80.

King William IV knighted him in 1831 after he demonstrated the military usefulness of the lasso. In 1834, Head was appointed as an assistant Poor Law Commissioner in Kent. While serving in this capacity, he drew up a document called Plan of a Rural Workhouse for 500 Persons, which established separate areas for males and females but mingled sick and well, young and old, sane and insane. He argued that provisions for the poor should not be superior to those earned by the independent labourer. The rooms, for example, were to hold eight residents in a 15' x 10' space, and the diet was to be strictly for subsistence, resulting in the kind of gruel portrayed in the workhouse scenes of Oliver Twist by Charles Dickens.

Head was appointed Lieutenant-Governor of Upper Canada in 1835 in an attempt by the British government to appease the reformers in the colony, such as William Lyon Mackenzie, who wanted responsible government. He appointed reformer Robert Baldwin to the Executive Council, but that appointment was opposed by the more radical Mackenzie. In any case, he ignored Baldwin's advice, and Baldwin resigned; the Legislative Assembly of the 12th Parliament of Upper Canada then refused to pass any money bills and so Head dissolved the government. In the subsequent election campaign, he appealed to the United Empire Loyalists of the colony, proclaiming that the reformers were advocating American republicanism. The Conservative party, led by the wealthy landowners known as the "Family Compact", won the election to the 13th Parliament of Upper Canada.

In December 1837, Mackenzie led a brief and bungled rebellion in Toronto. Sir Francis Bond Head later boasted that despite the evidence that poured in from every district in the province, he allowed Mackenzie to prepare a revolt. He further claimed that he encouraged the outbreak by sending all the troops from the province, laying a trap for Mackenzie, despite there being no troops, and the York Militia had been preparing for an attack. Head sent the colonial militia to put down the rebellion, which they did within four days. In response to the rebellion, Britain replaced Head as Lieutenant-Governor with Sir George Arthur and then Lord Durham. Head returned to England and settled down to write books and essays.

In later life Head lived at Duppas Hall, overlooking Duppas Hill in Croydon, where he organised protests against the proposed outlawing of horse-riding in the area. He was appointed to the Privy Council in 1867.

== Legacy ==
Several places in Ontario are named for Sir Francis Bond Head:

- Bond Head, an unincorporated area northwest of Toronto in the town of Bradford West Gwillimbury, Simcoe County
- Bond Head, a cape on Lake Ontario in the municipality of Clarington, Regional Municipality of Durham, to the east of Toronto, which gives its name to the adjacent settlement of Bond Head, and a local park west of the cape and east of the Port of Newcastle harbour.
- Three streets in the town of Oakville, Ontario named Francis, Bond, and Head. (Only Bond and Head remain.)
- Two streets in the city of St. Catharines, Ontario named 'Bond' and 'Head'. Though both streets are short, they intersect.
- Head Street in the city of Chatham was renamed Grand Avenue in 1909. It was the site of the Head Street School, the first public school in the north side of the city.
- The community of Frankford, on the Trent River, was named after Head after he crossed the river there while travelling.

== Works ==
- Life of Bruce (London, 1830), a biography of Scottish traveler James Bruce
- Bruce, James, Travels (1830), an abridged version of the 1790 work, edited by F. Bond Head.
- Head, Francis Bond. (1826). Rough Notes Taken during some Rapid Journeys across the Pampas and among the Andes. Murray (reissued by Cambridge University Press, 2009; ISBN 978-1-108-00161-8)
- "Bubbles from the Brunnens of Nassau, by an Old Man" (1834), travel in Germany
- Head, Francis Bond. (1846). The Emigrant. London: John Murray.
- Head, Francis B[ond]. (1852). A Fortnight in Ireland.
- The Defenceless State of Great Burray, 1869.

Government offices
Preceded by Sir John Colborne	Lieutenant Governor of Upper Canada; 1836–1838	Succeeded by Sir George Arthur
Baronetage of the United Kingdom
New creation	Baronet (of Rochester, Kent); 1838–1875	Succeeded by Francis Somerville Head
Academic offices
Preceded by Sir John Colborne	Chancellor of King's College; 1836–1838	Succeeded by Sir George Arthur
