= Thomas Belasyse, 1st Viscount Fauconberg =

English politician

Thomas Belasyse, 1st Viscount Fauconberg (1577 – 18 April 1653), styled Baron Fauconberg between 1627 and 1643 and Sir Thomas Belasyse, 2nd Baronet between 1624 and 1627, was an English politician who sat in the House of Commons at various times between 1597 and 1624 and was raised to the peerage in 1627. He was an ardent supporter of the Royalist cause in the English Civil War.

Before the Civil War, Belasyse and his family had a long running confrontation with Sir Thomas Wentworth, a close advisor to King Charles I, primarily over local government issues in Yorkshire. This confrontation did not shake Belasyse's support for the monarchy and before and during the Civil War, he and his son Henry, were ardent supporters of the Royalist cause. Charles honoured Belasye in appreciation, but towards the end of the First Civil War, Belasye was forced to flee abroad. While he was in exile his estates were sequestered by Parliament because he was a known "delinquent", and on his return to England and as he refused to swear to the oath of abjuration he was convicted of recusancy.

== Biography ==
Thomas Belasyse was the only son of Sir Henry Belasyse, 1st Baronet and his wife Ursula Fairfax. He was educated at Jesus College, Cambridge in the early 1590s. He had Roman Catholic leanings, and married into a known recusant family, but stayed within the laws of the time and attended Anglican Church services. He entered Parliament in 1597 when he was elected to represent Thirsk, a seat his father had held, in the second from last Elizabethan parliament. He was knighted by James I and served as a justice of the peace in the North Riding. He remained active in national politics and represented Thirsk again in the 1614, 1621, and 1624 parliaments of James I.

During the early years of the reign of Charles I the Belasyse family sided with Sir John Savile, the custos rotulorum of the West Riding, against Sir Thomas Wentworth. The Savile's allied themselves with the Duke of Buckingham and it may have been through this political connection that on 25 May 1627 that Belasyse was raised to the peerage as Lord Fauconberg of Yarm.

After the assassination of Buckingham, Wentworth's influence at court grew and with it his power, while that of his political opponents Yorkshire waned. After Wentworths's appointment as president of the council of the north in 1628, Fauconberg and his son Henry were briefly imprisoned and they opposed the style of government that Wentworth's influence at court helped to foster.

With the impeachment and execution of Wentworth, now 1st Earl of Strafford, in 1641 Fauconberg political fortunes waxed. Like many of the gentry and nobility with Roman Catholic leanings he supported Charles I in his struggle with Parliament. During the summer of 1642, in the months before the war started while Charles resided in York, Fauconberg and his sons Henry and John were prominent supporters. His elder son Henry a Knight of the Shire signed a treaty of neutrality with Thomas Fairfax, (but its terms were rejected by Parliament) and John his other son commanded a regiment of Foot. Fauconberg's loyalty to Charles was rewarded on 31 January 1643 he was granted the title of Viscount Fauconberg of Henknowle, county Durham (his second son, John, was made Baron Belasys of Worlaby in 1645).

Fauconberg supported William Cavendish, Marquis of Newcastle, followed the fortunes of that nobleman in the siege of York, which held out three months against powerful Scottish and Parliamentary armies. When the Royalists garrison of York and a relieving army under the command of Prince Rupert lost the Battle of Marston Moor on 2 July 1644, Newcastle and Fauconberg escaped into exile, embarking at Scarborough, for Hamburg. While he was abroad his estates were sequestered for his delinquency, which he compounded by paying a fine of £5012 18s. He returned to the North Riding in 1649 but refused to swear the Oath of Abjuration and was convicted of recusancy. He died on 18 April 1653, and was buried in the parish church of Coxwold, in the county of York.

== Family ==
Fauconberg married Barbara Cholmley (c. 1575 – 28 February 1619), the daughter of Sir Henry Cholmley of Roxby in Whitby Strand, a family noted for its recusancy. They had 2 sons and 5 daughters, who survived childhood:

- Henry Belasyse (1604–1647)
- John Belasyse, 1st Baron Belasyse
- Mary (1606–25) married John, lord Darcy of Darcy (c1579-1635) in 1624.
- Margaret (died 1624) married Sir Edward Osborne, 1st Baronet
- Barbara Belasyse (1609/1610 – 1641) married in 1631 Sir Henry Slingsby of Scriven, 1st Baronet.
- Ursula (1611-?1680) married Sir Walter Vavasour of Hazlewood Castle, Yorkshire
- Frances (1618-1680) married Sir Thomas Ingram

His eldest son Henry having predeceased him, he was succeeded by his grandson Thomas.

== Notes ==
Parliament of England
| Preceded by Sir John Dawney; Henry Belasyse | Member of Parliament for Thirsk; 1597; With: George Leycester | Succeeded by Henry Belasyse; John Mallory |
| Preceded by Sir Edward Swift; Timothy Whittingham | Member of Parliament for Thirsk; 1614–1624; With: Sir Robert Yaxley 1614–1620; Sir John Gibson 1620–1624; Sir William Sheffield 1624 | Succeeded by Henry Belasyse; Henry Stanley |
Peerage of England
| New creation | Viscount Fauconberg; 1643–1652 | Succeeded by Thomas Belasyse |
| New creation | Baron Fauconberg; 1627–1653 | Succeeded by Thomas Belasyse |
Baronetage of England
| Preceded by Henry Belasyse | Baronet (of Newborough); 1624–1653 | Succeeded by Thomas Belasyse |
