= Land (suffix) =

Suffix used for place names

The suffix -land, which can be found in the names of several countries or country subdivisions, indicates a toponymy - a land. The word derived from the Old English land, meaning "ground, soil", and "definite portion of the earth's surface, home region of a person or a people, territory marked by political boundaries".

It evolved from the Proto-Germanic *landą and from the Proto-Indo-European *lendʰ- "land, open land, heath". It is also a German, Dutch and North Germanic word with the same meaning as English land.

Below is the list of places that ends with "-land" or "Lands".

== Sovereign states ==
Common name:

- Finland
- Iceland
- Ireland
- The Netherlands
- Poland
- Switzerland
- Thailand
- New Zealand

Derived name:

- Marshall Islands
- Solomon Islands

States with limited recognition:

- Somaliland

== Sub-national administrative divisions ==
- Queensland, Australia
- Burgenland, Austria
- Newfoundland and Labrador, Canada
- Prince Edward Island, Canada
- Greenland, Denmark
- Åland, Finland
- Lapland, Finland
- Rhineland-Palatinate, Germany
- Saarland, Germany
- Nagaland, India
- Flevoland, the Netherlands
- Friesland, the Netherlands
- Gelderland, the Netherlands
- Zeeland, the Netherlands
- Jubaland, Somalia
- Puntland, Somalia
- England, United Kingdom
- Scotland, United Kingdom
- Maryland, United States

Derived name:

- North Holland, the Netherlands
- South Holland, the Netherlands
- Northern Ireland, United Kingdom
- Rhode Island, United States

== Other places ==
=== Australia ===
- Central Highlands Council, Tasmania
- Central Highlands Region, Queensland
- City of Merri-bek (previously City of Moreland), Victoria
- Shire of East Gippsland, Victoria
- City of Maitland, New South Wales
- City of Nedlands, Western Australia
- Northern Midlands Council, Tasmania
- Town of Port Hedland, Western Australia
- South Gippsland Shire, Victoria
- Southern Midlands Council, Tasmania
- Tablelands Region, Queensland
- Redlands City, Queensland
- Maitland, South Australia

Other places

- Arnhem Land, Northern Territory
- Central Highlands, Tasmania
- Central Queensland
- Far North Queensland
- Gippsland, Victoria
- Midlands, Tasmania
- Murraylands, South Australia
- New England, New South Wales
- North Queensland
- Northern Tablelands, New South Wales
- Portland, Victoria
- Riverland, South Australia
- South East Queensland
- Southern Highlands, New South Wales
- Southern Tablelands, New South Wales
- List of islands of Australia

=== Canada ===
Province level

- Newfoundland and Labrador
- Prince Edward Island

County level

- Starland
- Wheatland
- Parkland
- Woodlands
- Cumberland
- Westmorland
- Northumberland County, New Brunswick
- Northumberland County, Ontario
- Welland (historic)

Town level

- Daysland
- Hartland
- Ferryland
- Winterland
- Kirkland
- Midland
- Choiceland
- Luseland
- Zealandia
- Lower Mainland
- Cape Breton Highlands
- Welland
- Clarence-Rockland
- Rossland
- Sunderland
- Aroland
- Summerland
- Peachland
- List of islands of Canada

=== Czechia ===
- Sudetenland

=== Denmark ===
- Sjælland or Zealand
- Jylland or Jutland
- Sønderjylland
- Midtjylland
- Nordjylland
- Himmerland
- Lolland/Laaland

=== Finland ===
(Names in Swedish/Names in Finnish)

- Nyland / Uusimaa
- Egentliga Finland / Varsinais-Suomi
- Egentliga Tavastland / Kanta-Häme
- Birkaland / Pirkanmaa
- Päijänne-Tavastland / Päijät-Häme
- Mellersta Finland / Keski-Suomi
- Kajanaland / Kainuu
- Lappland / Lappi
- Åland / Ahvenanmaa

=== Germany ===
- A Bundesland
- Rheinland (Rhineland) and Rheinland-Pfalz
- Havelland
- Heligoland
- Jerichower Land
- Mansfelder Land
- Weimarer Land
- Altenburger Land
- Saale-Holzland
- Landsberg
- Saterland
- Sauerland
  - Hochsauerlandkreis
- Altes Land
- Vogtland
- Wendland
- Emsland
- Ostfriesland
- Uthlande
- Preetz-Land
- Amt Dobern-Land

=== The Netherlands ===
City level

- Ameland
- Berkelland
- Blokland
- Dinkelland
- Dirksland
- Drechterland
- Gaasterland
- Kollumerland
- Lansingerland
- Lemsterland
- Midden-Delfland
- Montferland
- Nieuw-Lekkerland
- Noord-Beveland
- Noorder-Koggenland
- Opsterland
- Oud-Beijerland
- Reiderland
- Scharsterland
- Schouwen-Duiveland
- Sint Annaland
- Smallingerland
- Steenwijkerland
- Vlieland
- Waterland
- Wester-Koggenland
- Westland
- Wormerland
- Zwartewaterland
- Zuid-Beveland

=== New Zealand ===
- Auckland
- Fiordland
- Northland
- Southland
- Westland

=== Norway ===
Vestlandet	Østlandet	Sørlandet	Trøndelag	Nord-Norge
Rogaland (county); Haugaland (district); Hjelmeland Municipality; Håland Municipality; Vestland (county); Hordaland (district); Sunnhordland (district); Midthordland (district); Nordhordland (district); Askeland (villages); Aurland Municipality; Meland Municipality	Akershus (county); Høland Municipality; Innlandet (county); Oppland (district); Land (district); Søndre Land Municipality; Nordre Land Municipality; Telemark (county); Grenland (district)	Agder (county); Bygland Municipality; Froland Municipality; Iveland Municipality	Trøndelag (county); Orkland Municipality; Ørland Municipality	Nordland (county); Helgeland (district); Vesterålen (district); Sortland Municipality; Troms (county); Skånland Municipality

=== Romania ===
- Székely Land (Szeklerland)

=== Serbia ===
- Ćaciland

=== Slovakia ===
- Hauerland

=== Sweden ===
- Skåneland (historical name for the provinces of Blekinge, Halland and Scania)

Götaland	Svealand	Norrland
Dalsland; Gotland; Halland; Småland; Västergötland; Öland; Östergötland	Södermanland; Uppland; Värmland; Västmanland	Gästrikland; Hälsingland; Jämtland; Lappland; Ångermanland

=== United Kingdom ===
Counties

- Northumberland
- Rutland
- West Midlands
- Cumberland (historic)
- Sutherland (historic)
- Westmorland (historic)

Other places:

- Backaland
- Backlands
- Bankland
- Barkisland
- Bennetland
- Berrylands
- Biglands
- Blackland
- Blakelands
- Blisland
- Bowland
- Bordlands
- Boreland
- Boyland
- Brackenlands
- Braehoulland
- Bridgelands
- Broadlands
- Brockhollands
- Brookland
- Brooklands
- Broomlands
- Browland
- Burland
- Burntisland
- Byland
- Collegeland
- East Midlands
- Goathland
- Scottish Highlands
- Shetland
- City of Sunderland
  - Sunderland
- Swithland
- West Midlands (region)
- List of islands of the United Kingdom

=== United States ===
Multi-state regions

- New England
- Dixieland

Regions entirely in a single state

- the Firelands
- Vacationland

State level

- Maryland

City level

- Ashland
- Cherryland
- Cleveland
- Cloverland
- Cortland
- Courtland
- Dairyland
- Forkland
- Kirtland
- Loveland
- Oakland
- Portland
- Ragland
- Saraland
- Vineland
- Woodland

Village level

- Rhineland
- List of islands of the United States

=== Other countries ===
- Akhzivland
- Bjarmaland, today comprise a part of Russia
- Boland, Iran
- Boland, Western Cape - South Africa
- Burzenland - Romania
- Courland - Latvia
- Czech lands
- Dubailand - Dubai
- Esanland - Nigeria
- Igboland - Nigeria
- Kvenland, Fennoscandia
- Maryland or Marimland - Russia
- Mashonaland - Zimbabwe
- Memelland
- Samland or Sambia or Kaliningrad Peninsula - Russia
- Slovene Lands
- Sudetenland - Czech Republic
- Sundaland
- Székely Land or Szeklerland - Romania
- Ussuriland - Russia
- Valland
- Vinland, North America
- Waasland - Belgium
- Wartheland
- Woodlands - Singapore
- Yorubaland - Benin, Nigeria, Togo
- Zululand - South Africa
- "Lands" of Antarctica (e.g. Queen Maud Land, Marie Byrd Land) – see Geography of Antarctica for further examples

== Former place names ==
- Ashantiland
- Basutoland
- (United Kingdom) Bechuanaland Protectorate
- (United Kingdom) Somaliland Protectorate
- State of Somaliland
- Matabeleland
- Nyasaland Protectorate
- Osterland
- Österland
- Pleissnerland
- Rugiland
- Stellaland
- Swaziland, officially renamed Eswatini
- Togoland
- Wituland

== Thematic parks ==
- Adventureland
- Coney Island
- Disneyland
- Everland
- Gardaland
- Kings Island
- Legoland
- NeverLand
- Seoul Land
- Wonderland

== Fictional places ==
From Peter Pan

- Neverland

From Alice in Wonderland

- Wonderland

From Middle-Earth:

- Brown Lands
- Dark Land
- Dunland
- Sun-Lands

From Chronicles of Narnia

- Archenland
- Shallow Lands
- Underland
- Burnt Island
- Dark Island
- Deathwater Island
- Dragon Island
- Lone Islands

== Other common names ==
- Buckland
- Copeland
- Falkland
- Frankland
- Happyland
- Headland
- Kirkland
- Kirtland
- La La Land
- Lakeland
- Leland
- Maitland
- Midland
- Newland
- Oberland
- Overland
- Parkland
- Redland
- Sealand
- Summerland
- Wayland
- Winterland
- Woodland
- Woodlands

== See also ==
- List of islands - which technically ends with the "-land" from the word island
- List of fictional islands
- Land as surnames
- -stan
