= Frankland =

Frankland may refer to:

== People ==
- Edward Frankland (1825–1899), English chemist
- George Frankland (1800–1838), English surveyor and Surveyor-General of Van Diemen's Land (now Tasmania)
- Henry Frankland (1690–1738), administrator of the English East India Company, President of Bengal
- Jane Frankland (born 1968), English cybersecurity expert
- Jocosa Frankland (1531–1587), English philanthropist
- Juliet Frankland (1929–2013), British mycologist
- Neil Frankland, editor of the Australian online newspaper The New Daily
- Noble Frankland (1922–2019), British historian
- Percy F. Frankland (1858–1946), British chemist
- Richard Frankland (born 1963), Australian playwright, scriptwriter and musician
- Richard Frankland (1630–1698), English nonconformist, founder of the dissenting Rathmell Academy
- Rosemarie Frankland (1943–2000), Welsh beauty pageant contestant and actress
- Shan Frankland, fictional character
- Thomas Frankland (disambiguation), several people
- William Frankland (disambiguation), several people

== Places ==
=== Australia ===
- Frankland, Western Australia
- Frankland Group National Park, Queensland
- Frankland Peak, mountain in South West Tasmania
- Frankland River (Western Australia)
- Frankland River (North West Tasmania)
- Frankland Range, Mountain range in South West Tasmania

=== Other countries ===
- State of Frankland or State of Franklin, an unrecognized autonomous United States territory created in 1784
- Francia or Frankland, a European territory inhabited and ruled by the Franks from the 3rd to the 10th century

== Other ==
- Frankland baronets The Frankland Baronetcy, of Thirkelby in the County of York, was created in 1660 and is extant.
- Frankland (HM Prison), a prison near Durham, England
- Howard Frankland Bridge, the central bridge spanning Old Tampa Bay from St. Petersburg, Florida to Tampa, Florida
