= The Lion (Tasmania) =

Mountain in Tasmania, Australia

Highest point
- Elevation: 988 m (3,241 ft)
- Prominence: 650 m (2,130 ft)
- Coordinates: 42°56′52″S 146°03′11″E

Geography
- Location: Tasmania, Australia
- Parent range: Frankland Range

The Lion is a mountain in South West Tasmania. It lies on the North West end of the Frankland Range jutting out toward the East from the range toward the impoundment Lake Pedder. It is the third-highest mountain in the Frankland Range. It is directly South of The Cupola and North of The Citadel.

== See also ==
- Lake Pedder
- Strathgordon, Tasmania
- South West Wilderness, Tasmania
