= Mount Lloyd Jones =

Mountain in Tasmania, Australia

Highest point
- Elevation: 982 m (3,222 ft)
- Prominence: 600 m (2,000 ft)
- Coordinates: 42°58′48″S 146°10′14″E

Geography
- Location: Tasmania, Australia
- Parent range: Frankland Range

Mount Lloyd Jones is a mountain in South West Tasmania named after aviator and adventurer, Lloyd Lindsay Jones MBE (1916–2004). It lies on the South East end of the Frankland Range jutting out towards the east from the range towards the impoundment Lake Pedder. It is west of the end of the ridge line leading to the edge of Lake Pedder at Terminal Peak and North East of Secheron Peak.

== See also ==
- Lake Pedder
- Strathgordon, Tasmania
- South West Wilderness, Tasmania
