= Cleft Peak =

Mountain in Tasmania, Australia

Highest point
- Elevation: 946 m (3,104 ft)
- Prominence: 600 m (2,000 ft)
- Coordinates: 42°57′45″S 146°05′30″E

Geography
- Location: Tasmania, Australia
- Parent range: Frankland Range

Cleft Peak is a mountain in South West Tasmania. It lies on the North West end of the Frankland Range jutting out toward the East from the range toward the impoundment, Lake Pedder. It is South East of Murpheys Bluff and North West of Greycap.

== See also ==
- Lake Pedder
- Strathgordon, Tasmania
- South West Wilderness, Tasmania
