= Raglan =

Raglan may refer to:

== People ==
- FitzRoy Somerset, 1st Baron Raglan (1788–1855), British Army officer, commander of British troops during the Crimean War
- Raglan (surname)
- Raglan Squire (1912–2004), British architect

== Places ==
=== Australia ===
- County of Raglan, a cadastral division in Queensland
- Raglan, New South Wales, a suburb of Bathurst
- Raglan, Queensland, a town in Gladstone Region
- Raglan, Victoria, a town

=== Canada ===
- Raglan, Chatham-Kent, Ontario
- Raglan, Durham Regional Municipality, Ontario, a hamlet in Oshawa
- Raglan Mine, a nickel mining complex in northern Quebec
- Brudenell, Lyndoch and Raglan, a township in Ontario

=== New Zealand ===
- Raglan, New Zealand, a town on the west coast of the North Island
  - Raglan (New Zealand electorate), a former parliamentary electorate centred on the town

=== United Kingdom ===
- Raglan Castle, a building in Raglan, Monmouthshire
- Raglan, Monmouthshire, a large village in Wales
  - Raglan Hundred, a division of the traditional county of Monmouthshire

== Other uses ==
- Raglan sleeve, a type of clothing sleeve
- Baron Raglan, a title in the Peerage of the United Kingdom
- HMS Raglan, a First World War I Royal Navy monitor named after the 1st Baron

== See also ==
- Raglan Road (disambiguation)
- Ragland (disambiguation)
