= Redtop Peak =

Mountain in Tasmania, Australia

Highest point
- Elevation: 935 m (3,068 ft)
- Prominence: 600 m (2,000 ft)
- Coordinates: 42°56′10″S 146°02′20″E

Geography
- Location: Tasmania, Australia
- Parent range: Frankland Range

Redtop Peak is a mountain in South West Tasmania.

== Location ==
It lies on the North West end of the Frankland Range and the South West end of the Madonna Ridge above the impoundment Lake Pedder, to the west of The Cupola.

== See also ==
- Lake Pedder
- Strathgordon, Tasmania
- South West Wilderness
