= Greycap =

Mountain in Tasmania, Australia

Highest point
- Elevation: 898 m (2,946 ft)
- Prominence: 550 m (1,800 ft)
- Coordinates: 42°58′16″S 146°06′25″E

Geography
- Location: Tasmania, Australia
- Parent range: Frankland Range

Greycap is a mountain in South West Tasmania. It lies near the centre of the Frankland Range towards the impoundment Lake Pedder. It is south east of Cleft Peak and north west of Frankland Saddle. It is a wider than most of the other peaks on the Frankland Range, with less steep sloping sides.

== See also ==
- Lake Pedder
- Strathgordon, Tasmania
- South West Wilderness
