= Cloverland, Wisconsin =

Cloverland may refer to places in the U.S. state of Wisconsin:

- Cloverland, Douglas County, Wisconsin, a town
- Cloverland, Vilas County, Wisconsin, a town
- Cloverland (community), Wisconsin, an unincorporated community
