= Murpheys Bluff =

Mountain in Tasmania, Australia

Highest point
- Elevation: 881 m (2,890 ft)
- Prominence: 550 m (1,800 ft)
- Coordinates: 42°57′16″S 146°04′48″E

Geography
- Location: Tasmania, Australia
- Parent range: Frankland Range

Murpheys Bluff is a mountain in South West Tasmania. It lies on the North West end of the Frankland Range jutting out toward the East from the range toward the impoundment Lake Pedder. It is directly East of The Citadel and North West of Cleft Peak. It towers above Bluff Tarn to the North West.

== See also ==
- Lake Pedder
- Strathgordon, Tasmania
- South West Wilderness
