= Terminal Peak =

Mountain in Tasmania, Australia

Highest point
- Elevation: 785 m (2,575 ft)
- Prominence: 350 m (1,150 ft)
- Coordinates: 42°58′56″S 146°11′59″E

Geography
- Location: Tasmania, Australia
- Parent range: Frankland Range

Terminal Peak is a mountain in South West Tasmania.

It lies on the north east end of the Frankland Range jutting out towards the east from a ridge off the range towards the impoundment Lake Pedder. It is east of Mount Lloyd Jones and north west of Mount Jim Brown. It overlooks Mount Solitary, which is surrounded by Lake Pedder.

== See also ==
- Lake Pedder
- Strathgordon, Tasmania
- South West Wilderness, Tasmania
