= Right angle (disambiguation) =

A right angle is an angle that bisects the angle formed by two halves of a straight line.

Right angle or Rightangle may also refer to:

- Right Angle (film), a 2013 drama
- Right Angle Peak, a mountain in South West Tasmania, Australia
- Rightangle, Kentucky, an unincorporated community in Clark County
