= The Citadel (mountain) =

Mountain in Tasmania, Australia

Highest point
- Elevation: 929 m (3,048 ft)
- Prominence: 600 m (2,000 ft)
- Coordinates: 42°57′20″S 146°04′00″E

Geography
- Location: Tasmania, Australia
- Parent range: Frankland Range

The Citadel is a mountain in South West Tasmania. It lies on the north east end of the Frankland Range jutting out towards the east from the range towards the impoundment Lake Pedder. It is directly south of The Lion and west of Murpheys Bluff. It forms the south eastern border of The Moat, an alpine lake.

== See also ==
- Lake Pedder
- Strathgordon, Tasmania
- South West Wilderness
