= Secheron Peak =

Mountain in Tasmania, Australia

- Location within Tasmania

Highest point
- Elevation: 1,068 m (3,504 ft)
- Prominence: 700 m (2,300 ft)
- Coordinates: 42°59′14″S 146°09′21″E

Geography
- Location: Tasmania, Australia
- Parent range: Frankland Range

Secheron Peak is a mountain in South West Tasmania. It lies on the southeastern end of the Frankland Range near the impoundment Lake Pedder. It is east of Frankland Peak and towers over Lake Surprise to the north. Right Angle Peak lies one kilometre to the southwest.

== See also ==
- Strathgordon, Tasmania
- South West Wilderness, Tasmania
