= Frankland Peak =

Mountain in Tasmania, Australia

- Location within Tasmania

Highest point
- Elevation: 1,083 m (3,553 ft)
- Prominence: 700 m (2,300 ft)
- Coordinates: 42°59′09″S 146°08′39″E

Geography
- Location: Tasmania, Australia
- Parent range: Frankland Range

Frankland Peak is a mountain in South West Tasmania. It lies on the southeastern end of the Frankland Range near the impoundment Lake Pedder. It is west of Secheron Peak and north of Right Angle Peak.

== See also ==
- Strathgordon, Tasmania
- South West Wilderness, Tasmania
