= Cloverland =

Cloverland may refer to some places in the United States:

- Cloverland, Indiana
- Cloverland, Houston, Texas
- Cloverland, Washington, a former settlement
- Cloverland, Vilas County, Wisconsin, a town
- Cloverland, Douglas County, Wisconsin, a town
- Cloverland (community), Wisconsin, an unincorporated community
- Cloverland Electric Cooperative
- An early 20th century branding name for parts of the Upper Peninsula of Michigan
