= William Franklin (disambiguation) =

William Franklin (1731–1813) was the last Royal Governor of New Jersey, and the son of Benjamin Franklin.

William Franklin may also refer to:

- William Temple Franklin (1760–1823), William Franklin's son and Benjamin Franklin's grandson
- William Franklin (physician) (1763–1833), British surgeon and General Inspector of Hospitals
- William Franklin (Ireland), Irish Protestant leader of the 17th century
- William Franklin (singer) (1906–?), opera singer
- William B. Franklin (1823–1903), Union Army general during the American Civil War
- William Franklin (assistant bishop of Peterborough) (1916–1998), British Anglican bishop, also of the Episcopal Diocese of Colombia
- William Edwin Franklin (1930–2026), bishop of the Roman Catholic Diocese of Davenport
- Webb Franklin (William Webster Franklin, born 1941), U.S. representative from Mississippi
- William Franklin (gridiron football) (born 1985), wide receiver for the Oakland Raiders
- Will Franklin (basketball) (born 1949), retired basketball power forward
- Bill Franklin (1884–1968), Australian rules footballer
- William Henderson Franklin (1852–1935), American educator, minister, journalist, and school founder
- William Henry Franklin (1911–1940), Royal Air Force fighter pilot

== See also ==
- William Franklyn (disambiguation)
- William Francklin (1763–1839), orientalist
- William Frankland (disambiguation)
