= New River lagoon =

New River Lagoon may refer to:

- New River (Belize)
- Precipitous Bluff (New River Lagoon), Tasmania
