= The Cupola (mountain) =

Mountain in Tasmania, Australia

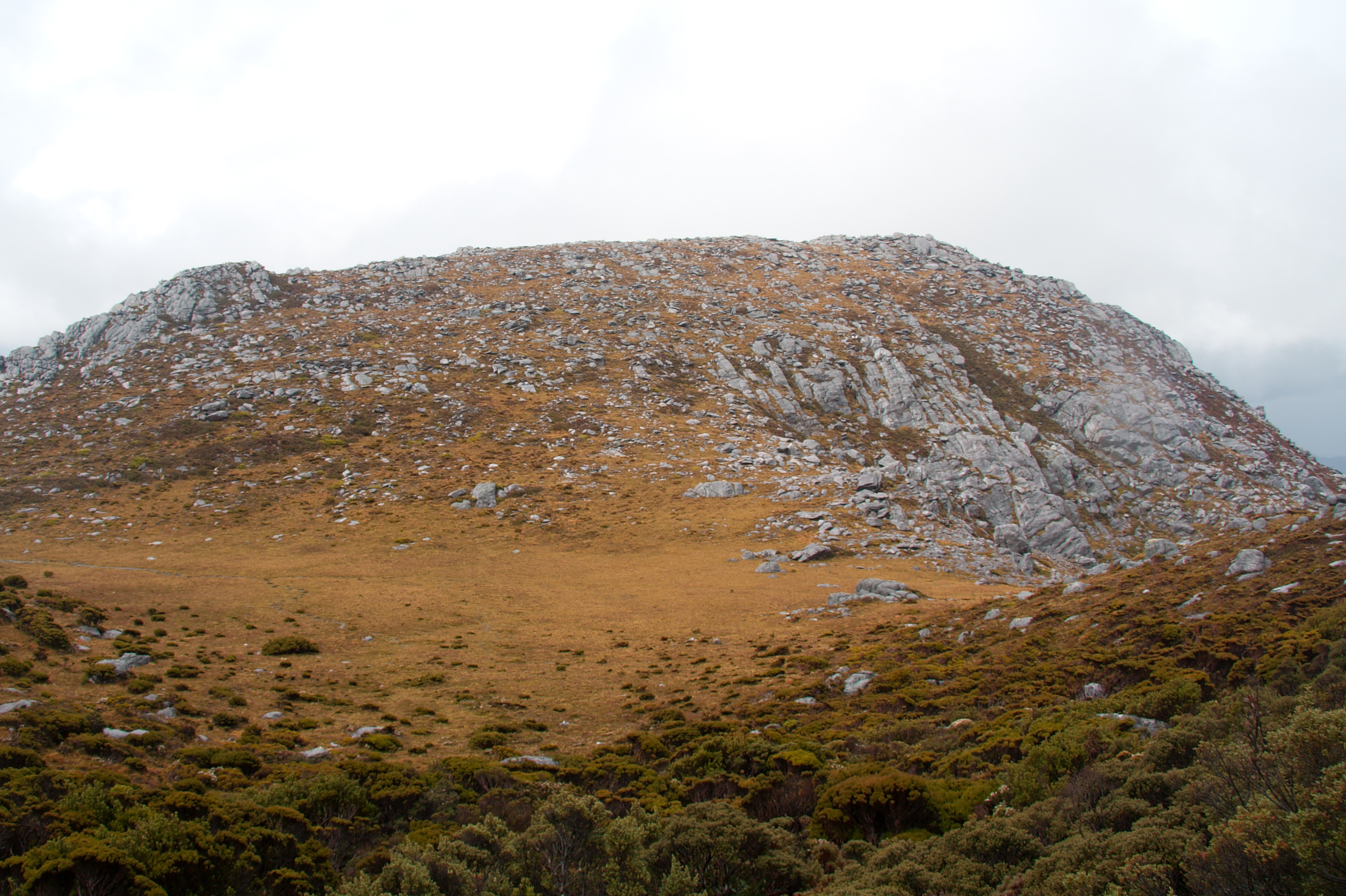

Highest point
- Elevation: 970 m (3,180 ft)
- Prominence: 650 m (2,130 ft)
- Parent peak: Frankland Peak
- Coordinates: 42°56′16″S 146°03′04″E

Geography
- Location within Tasmania
- Location: South West Tasmania
- Parent range: Frankland Range
- Topo map: Solitary

The Cupola is a mountain in the south-west region of Tasmania, Australia. Situated on the Frankland Range, The Cupola has an elevation of 970 metres (3,180 ft) above sea level and juts out from the range towards the impoundment Lake Pedder. The Redtop Peak is situated to the west of The Cupola.

The mountain's name may derive from cupola, a dome-shaped ornamental structure located on top of a larger roof or dome.

== See also ==
- List of mountains in Tasmania
- Strathgordon, Tasmania
