= William E. Franklin =

William E. Franklin may refer to:

- William Edwin Franklin (born 1930), Roman Catholic bishop in the USA
- William E. Franklin, editor of the magazine of the Theta Tau fraternity

== See also ==
- William Franklin (disambiguation)
