= Vinland (disambiguation) =

Vinland was an area of coastal North America explored by Vikings.

Vinland may also refer to:

== Places in the United States ==
- Vinland, Kansas
- Vinland, Wisconsin
- Vinland Estate, an estate owned by Salve Regina University in Newport, Rhode Island

== Other uses ==
- Vinland (novel), a 1992 historical novel by George Mackay Brown

== See also ==
- Vinland Saga (disambiguation)
- Vinlanders, a Canadian folk metal band
- Vineland (disambiguation)
