= Vinland Saga =

Vinland Saga may refer to:

- Norse settlement of North America
- Vinland sagas, two 13th-century Icelandic texts about the discovery, exploration, and settlement of Vinland by Erik the Red
- Vinland Saga (album), a 2005 album by Leaves' Eyes
- Vinland Saga (manga), a Japanese manga series by Makoto Yukimura
  - Vinland Saga (TV series), a Japanese anime television series based on the manga series

== See also ==
- Vinland (disambiguation)
