= La La Land (disambiguation) =

La La Land is a 2016 American musical romantic comedy-drama film.

La La Land may also refer to:

- a nickname for Los Angeles

== Film and television ==
- La La Land (TV series), a 2010 comedy series starring Marc Wootton
- La La Land (TV series), a 2012 series
- La La Land, a 2008 TV film starring Robert Rusler

== Music ==
- La La Land (Ed Hall album) (1995)
- La La Land (Guided by Voices album) (2023)
- La La Land (Plants and Animals album) (2010)
- La La Land (Wax Fang album) (2007)
- La La Land (soundtrack) (2016)
- Live from La La Land, a live album by Jon Anderson (2007)
- "La La Land" (Green Velvet song) (2001)
- "La La Land" (Demi Lovato song) (2008)
- "La La Land" (Bryce Vine song) (2019)
- "La La Land", a 1997 song by All Star United from eponymous album
- "La La Land", a 2009 song by Aimee Allen from A Little Happiness
- "La-La-Land", a 1998 song by Big Daddy Kane from Veteranz' Day
- "La-La-Land", a 2001 song by The Go-Go's from God Bless the Go-Go's
- "La La Land", a 2016 song by Jax
- "La La Land", a 1996 song by Shihad from Shihad
- La-La Land, a Burbank, California record company founded in 2002 specializing in film and television soundtracks
- La-La Land, a record label notable for the 1994 release of the single "Jack Names the Planets" by Ash

== See also ==
- Fantasy-prone personality
- Lolland or Laaland, an island in Denmark
