= Wax Fang =

American rock band

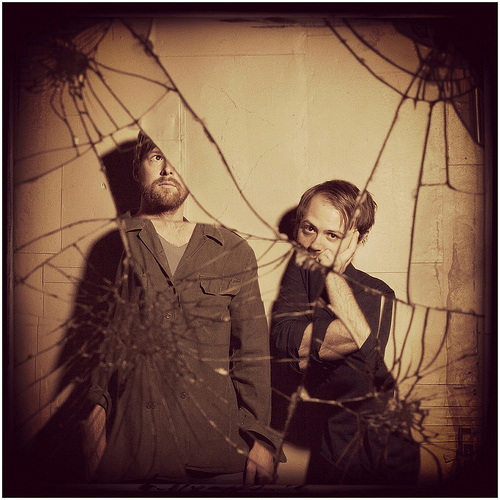
- Wax Fang band members Jacob Heustis and Scott Carney in 2013

Background information
- Origin: Louisville, Kentucky, United States
- Genres: Psychedelic rock, progressive rock, experimental rock, electronic, folk rock
- Years active: 2005-present
- Labels: Don't Panic, Absolutely Kosher, Removador Recordings & Solutions
- Members: Scott Carney; Corey McAfee; Zach Driscoll; Dave Chale
- Past members: Kevin Ratterman; Jacob Heustis
- Website: waxfang.com

Wax Fang is an American rock band formed in Louisville, Kentucky, United States, that combines elements of classic, psychedelic, progressive, and experimental rock music, as well as electronic and folk. The band consists of Scott Carney, Corey McAfee, Zach Driscoll, and Dave Chale.

== History ==
=== Black And Endless Night ===
The debut LP, Black & Endless Night, was originally released as a solo album by Scott Carney in December 2005. After Jacob Heustis (bass) and Kevin Ratterman (drums) began performing with Carney, the band began playing under the moniker Wax Fang and Black & Endless Night was subsequently re-released as a Wax Fang album on their own label, Don't Panic Records.

=== La La Land ===
After touring with My Morning Jacket in the fall of 2006, the band entered Ardent Studios with engineer Doug Easley (Easley McCain Recording) (Pavement, Sonic Youth, Guided by Voices) to begin recording their next album, La La Land. The band then opened for My Morning Jacket on New Year's Eve 2006 at The Fillmore in San Francisco.

In 2007, Wax Fang opened for Spoon, Black Mountain, Man Man, The Whigs and The Features. La La Land was released in November 2007.

In 2009, the band played SXSW, Summerfest, and the Wakarusa Festival.

In February 2010, the band signed with Absolutely Kosher Records for the European release of La La Land. Wax Fang toured the UK in May 2010 playing such festivals as All Tomorrow's Parties (curated by Pavement), The Dot To Dot Festival, The Great Escape Festival, and "the Stag & Dagger Festival". The tour also included a BBC Session on BBC Radio 1.

In 2013, Scott Carney scored episode 151 of the television series American Dad, and the song "Majestic" was featured prominently in the storyline.

=== The Astronaut (Part 1) ===
In October 2010, Wax Fang released a 17-minute digital-only single on Removador Recordings & Solutions called The Astronaut (Part 1). The band opened for My Morning Jacket at the KFC Yum! Center to commemorate the release.

In November 2011, Wax Fang toured with Dr. Dog.

=== Mirror, Mirror EP ===
In August 2012, SPIN announced the release of the Mirror, Mirror EP. SPIN later premiered the video for the title track, "Mirror, Mirror". The video was self- produced by Scott Carney and Jacob Heustis.

In April 2013, SPIN announced the release of Wax Fang's digital-only single, "The Blonde Leading The Blonde". The following month, on May 22, 2013, the video for "The Blonde Leading The Blonde" was premiered on Conan O'Brien's online site Team Coco.

On August 30, 2013, MTV Hive premiered the standalone track "King of the Kingdom of Man".

=== Victory Laps ===
On May 5, 2017, Wax Fang released their fourth studio album titled Victory Laps.

== Touring ==
The band has toured alongside acts such as My Morning Jacket, Spoon, Man Man, The Whigs, The Features, and Dr. Dog.

Festivals include SXSW, Summerfest, Wakarusa Festival, All Tomorrow's Parties (curated by Pavement), The Dot To Dot Festival, The Great Escape Festival and the Stag and Dagger Festival.

== Members ==
Current Members

- Scott Carney - lead vocals, guitar, keyboards, piano, theremin, percussion
- Corey McAfee - Manager, Bass
- Zach Driscoll - Keyboards
- Dave Chale - Drums

Former Members

- Kevin Ratterman - drums, percussion, keyboards, synthesizer (2005–2011)
- Jacob Heustis - bass, keyboards, backing vocals (2005–2017)

== Discography ==
=== Albums ===
- Black And Endless Night (2005) re release under the name Wax Fang (2006)
- La La Land (2007)
- The Astronaut (2014)
- Victory Laps (2017)

=== Singles ===
- "Majestic" (2008)
- "The Astronaut (Part 1)" (2010)
- "The Blonde Leading The Blonde" (2013)
- "King Of The Kingdom Of Man" (2013)
- "Hearts Are Made For Beating" (2013)
- "Exit Strategy" (2015)
- "Pusher" (2017)
- "The Things I Do for Fun" (2017)
- "Glass Island (feat. Lacey Guthrie)" (2017)

=== EPs ===
- Mirror, Mirror (2012)
- Repetition (2019)

== In popular culture ==
The 151st episode of American Dad!, entitled "Lost in Space", features the songs "Majestic", "The Astronaut Part 2" and "At Sea".
