= Boyland =

Boyland is a surname. Notable people with the surname include:

- Ari Boyland (born 1987), New Zealand stage and television actor
- Doe Boyland (born 1955), American baseball player
- John Boyland (1874–1922), Australian trade unionist and politician
- Rosanne Boyland (????–2021), an American woman who died during the January 6th protests
- Steve Boyland, New Zealand association footballer
- Thomas S. Boyland (1942–1982), American politician
- William Boyland (Australian politician) (1885–1967), member of the Victorian Legislative Assembly
- William F. Boyland, New York assemblyman
- William Boyland Jr., his son, New York assemblyman

== See also ==
- Boyland Common
