= Dairyland =

Dairyland may refer to:

- Dairyland, California (disambiguation), multiple places
- Dairyland, Wisconsin, a town
- Dairyland (community), Wisconsin, an unincorporated community
- Dairyland Canada, a division of Saputo
- Dairyland Insurance, a United States insurance company
