= William Franklyn (disambiguation) =

William Franklyn is an actor.

William Franklyn may also refer to:

- William Franklyn (British Army officer) (1856–1914), British general
- William Franklyn (priest) (1480?–1556), Dean of Windsor

== See also ==
- William Franklin (disambiguation)
