= Forkland =

Forkland may refer to:

- Forkland, Alabama, a town in Greene County, Alabama
- Forkland, Kentucky, a community in Boyle County, Kentucky
- Forkland, Virginia, a community in Nottoway County, Virginia
