= Frankland Range =

Mountain range in Tasmania, Australia

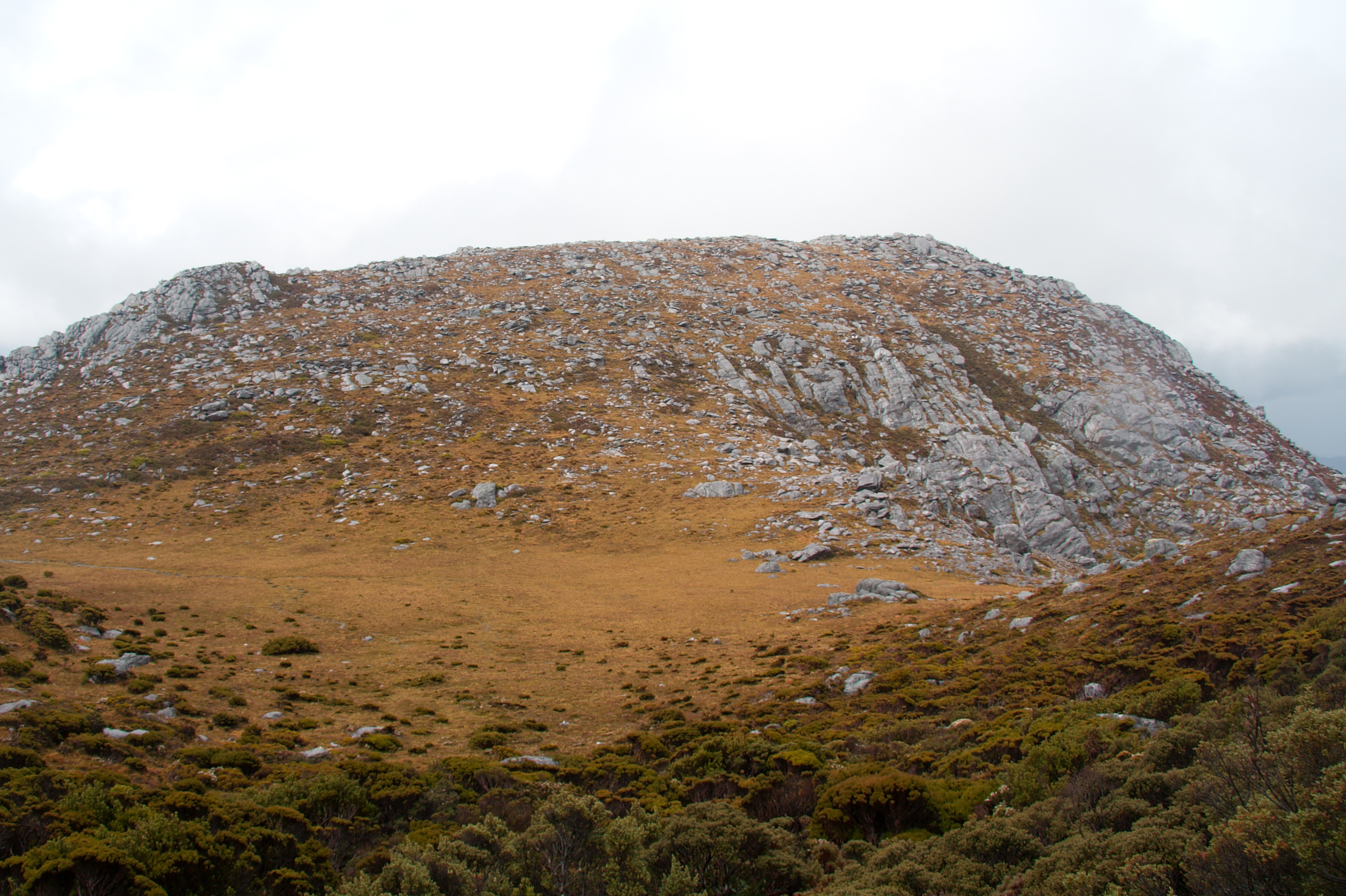
- The Cupola, one of the peaks in the range.

Highest point
- Peak: Frankland Peak
- Elevation: 1,083 m (3,553 ft); AHD
- Coordinates: 42°58′48″S 146°08′24″E

Geography
- Location within Tasmania
- Country: Australia
- State: Tasmania
- Region: South West
- Range coordinates: 42°59′S 146°09′E

The Frankland Range is a mountain range in the south-west region of Tasmania, Australia. The range forms part of a natural south-western border to the impounded Lake Pedder, formed by the damming of the Serpentine and Huon rivers.

As part of the South West Wilderness area, it is a less popular site of bushwalking than other, more famous, ranges in Tasmania's South West, and is for much more advanced walkers due to its length, isolation and terrain. Access routes to the range are by boat from the lake, or the roads at Strathgordon or Scotts Peak Dam.

Nearby ranges include the Arthur, Companion, Folded, Tribulation, and the Wilmot ranges.

== Notable peaks ==
Rank	Name	Height	Location	Notes
1	Frankland Peak	1,083 metres (3,553 ft)	42°58′48″S 146°08′24″E	
2	Secheron Peak	1,068 metres (3,504 ft)	42°59′14″S 146°09′21″E	
3	The Lion	988 metres (3,241 ft)	42°56′52″S 146°03′11″E	
4	Mount Lloyd Jones	982 metres (3,222 ft)	42°58′48″S 146°10′14″E	
5	The Cupola	970 metres (3,182 ft)	42°56′16″S 146°03′04″E	
6	Right Angle Peak	954 metres (3,130 ft)	42°59′40″S 146°08′31″E	
7	Cleft Peak	946 metres (3,104 ft)	42°57′45″S 146°05′30″E	
8	Redtop Peak	935 metres (3,068 ft)	42°56′10″S 146°02′20″E	
9	The Citadel	929 metres (3,048 ft)	42°57′20″S 146°04′00″E	
10	Greycap	898 metres (2,946 ft)	42°58′16″S 146°06′25″E	
11	Murpheys Bluff	881 metres (2,890 ft)	42°57′16″S 146°04′48″E	
12	Terminal Peak	785 metres (2,575 ft)	42°58′56″S 146°11′59″E	

== See also ==
- List of mountain ranges in Tasmania
