= Kirtland =

Kirtland may refer to:

== Places ==
- Kirtland, Ohio, a city located in Lake County, Ohio, United States
  - Kirtland Temple, the first temple to be built by adherents of the Latter Day Saint movement
- Kirtland, New Mexico, a census-designated place located in San Juan County, New Mexico, United States
- Kirtland Air Force Base at Albuquerque, New Mexico, United States
- Kirtland Community College, a public college in Northern Michigan.

== Nature ==
- Kirtland Formation, a geological deposit in the U.S. state of New Mexico
- Kirtland's warbler (Setophaga kirtlandii)
- Kirtland's snake (Clonophis kirtlandii)

== Surname ==
- Ben Kirtland, American ice hockey coach
- Dorrance Kirtland (1770–1840), American politician
- Fred D. Kirtland (c. 1893–1972), American Navy officer
- Helen Johns Kirtland (1890–1979), American photojournalist and war correspondent
- Jared Potter Kirtland (1793–1877), American naturalist
- Roy Carrington Kirtland (1874–1941), U.S. Army officer and aviation pioneer

== Organizations ==
- Kirtland Records, a record label based in Dallas, Texas, United States
- Kirtland Safety Society, a short-lived, 1837 joint stock company founded and organized by leaders and followers of the then-named Church of Christ of Latter Day Saints

== Documents ==
- Kirtland Egyptian papers (KEP) are a Latter Day Saint collection of documents created in Kirtland, Ohio during 1835 and in Nauvoo, Illinoia during 1842
