= Right Angle Peak =

Mountain in Tasmania, Australia

- Location within Tasmania

Highest point
- Elevation: 954 m (3,130 ft)
- Prominence: 600 m (2,000 ft)
- Coordinates: 42°59′40″S 146°08′31″E

Geography
- Location: Tasmania, Australia
- Parent range: Frankland Range

Right Angle Peak is a mountain in South West Tasmania. It lies to the south east of the Frankland Range near the impoundment Lake Pedder. It is surrounded by small lakes such as Lake Surprise to the east. It is south west of Secheron Peak.

== See also ==
- Strathgordon, Tasmania
- South West Wilderness, Tasmania
