= Ben Kirtland =

Ben Kirtland is a former coach for the Connecticut Huskies men's ice hockey team and former associate athletic director at the University of Kansas.

== Professional career ==
Kirtland coached seven seasons at the Division III level from 1981 to 1988. He led the team to one winning season during his tenure, leaving with an overall career coaching record of 85 wins, 98 losses, and 2 ties.

== Head coaching record ==
Record table
Season	Team	Overall	Conference	Standing	Postseason
Connecticut Huskies (ECAC 2) (1981–1985)
1981–82	Connecticut	9–11–0	5–11–0	22nd	
1982–83	Connecticut	10–14–0	8–11–0	19th	
1983–84	Connecticut	13–15–0	7–13–0	21st	
1984–85	Connecticut	14–10–0	10–8–0	12th	ECAC East Quarterfinals
Connecticut:		46–50–0	30–43–0		
Connecticut Huskies (ECAC East) (1985–1988)
1985–86	Connecticut	16–17–0	12–10–0	T–6th	ECAC East Quarterfinals
1986–87	Connecticut	11–16–2	10–9–2	6th	ECAC East Quarterfinals
1987–88	Connecticut	12–15–0	9–12–0	9th	
Connecticut:		39–48–2	31–31–2		
Total:		85–98–2			
National champion Postseason invitational champion Conference regular season champion Conference regular season and conference tournament champion Division regular season champion Division regular season and conference tournament champion Conference tournament champion

Kirtland was the former associate athletic director at the University of Kansas up until mid-2011.

== Controversies ==
Kirtland was a part of the Kansas Ticket Gang, which made money off of reselling tickets for the University of Kansas's football and basketball games.

Kirkland pleaded guilty in February 2011 for conspiracy to defraud the United States, interstate transport of stolen property, and tax obstruction. He was sentenced to 57 months in federal prison.
