= Rightangle, Kentucky =

Rightangle
- Unincorporated community
- Location within the state of Kentucky Rightangle (the United States)
- Coordinates: 37°53′41″N 84°1′43″W
- Country: United States
- State: Kentucky
- County: Clark
- Elevation: 784 ft (239 m)
- Time zone: UTC-6 (Eastern(EST))
  - Summer (DST): UTC-5 (EDT)
- GNIS feature ID: 508938

Rightangle is an unincorporated community in Clark County, Kentucky, United States.

A post office was established at Rightangle in 1883, and remained in operation until 1931. The community most likely was named after their Masonic lodge. The Right Angle Lodge met on the first Saturday of every month.
