= Collegeland =

Collegeland may refer to:

Northern Ireland

- Collegeland, County Armagh

Republic of Ireland

- Collegeland, County Dublin, a townland in Rathcoole civil parish, barony of Newcastle, County Dublin
- Collegeland, County Kildare, a townland in Maynooth civil parish, barony of North Salt, County Kildare
- Collegeland, County Meath
- Collegeland, County Westmeath, a townland in St. Mary's civil parish, barony of Brawny, County Westmeath

== See also ==
- Land-grant university
