= Happy Land =

Happy Land or Happyland may refer to:

== Arts and entertainment ==
- The Happy Land, an 1873 play by W. S. Gilbert and Gilbert Arthur à Beckett
- Happy Land (film), a 1943 film starring Don Ameche
- Happy Land (TV series), a Philippine TV show by GMA Network
- Happyland (band), an Australian band
- Happyland (album), by Amanda Jenssen
- Happyland (novel), a novel by J. Robert Lennon
- Happyland (opera), opera by Reginald De Koven
- Happyland (TV series), an MTV comedy series
- "Happyland" (song), by Måns Zelmerlöw
- Happy Land!, a song by Edward F. Rimbault

== Places ==
- Happyland, Connecticut, United States, an unincorporated community in the town of Preston, Connecticut
- Happyland, Oklahoma, United States, an unincorporated community
- Happyland (provincial electoral district), a former electoral district in Saskatchewan, Canada
- Rural Municipality of Happyland No. 231, a rural municipality in Saskatchewan, Canada

Amusement parks:

- Happyland Amusement Park, a defunct amusement park in Staten Island, New York, United States
- Happyland (Bangkok), a defunct amusement park in Bang Kapi, Bangkok, Thailand
- Happyland Park, a defunct amusement park in Winnipeg, Manitoba, Canada
- Happyland, a defunct amusement park in Vancouver, British Columbia, Canada, and predecessor to Playland

== Other uses ==
- Happy Land, a New York City social club, site of the Happy Land fire, a 1990 arson fire that killed 87 patrons
- Happyland Higher Secondary School, Rajbiraj, Nepal
- Happyland, a former fresh air summer camp near Woodwardville, Maryland
