= Steve Boyland =

New Zealand footballer

Personal information
- Full name: Steve J Boyland
- Place of birth: New Zealand

Senior career*
Years	Team	Apps	(Gls)
- Stop Out

International career
1973	New Zealand	1	(0)
- * Club domestic league appearances and goals

Steve Boyland is a former association football player who represented New Zealand at international level.

Boyland made a solitary official international appearance for New Zealand in a 0–0 draw with Iran on 12 August 1973.
