= Thomas Frankland =

Thomas Frankland may refer to:

- Sir Thomas Frankland, 2nd Baronet (1665–1726), English Member of Parliament
- Sir Thomas Frankland, 3rd Baronet (c. 1685–1747), English Member of Parliament
- Sir Thomas Frankland, 5th Baronet (1718–1784), British naval officer, MP and slave trader
- Sir Thomas Frankland, 6th Baronet (1750–1831), British landowner and MP
- Sir Thomas Frankland Lewis, 1st Baronet (1780–1855), British Poor Law Commissioner and MP
