= La La Land (Wax Fang album) =

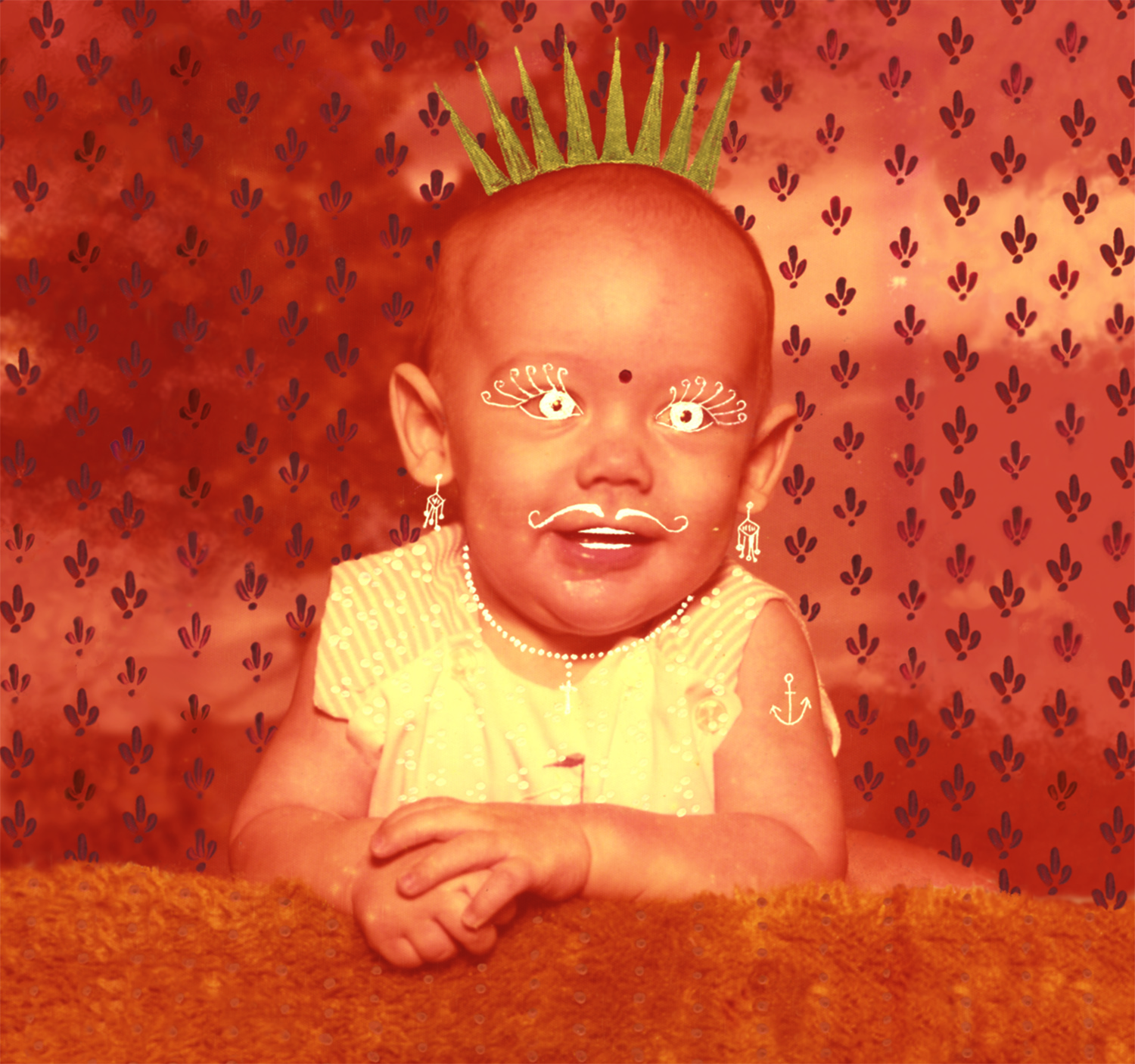

Studio album by Wax Fang
- Released: November 17, 2007
- Recorded: Beech House
- Genre: Indie rock; psychedelic rock; progressive rock; post-rock
- Length: 47:55
- Label: Don't Panic Records; Absolutely Kosher Records
- Producer: Wax Fang

Wax Fang chronology
Black & Endless Night (2005)	La La Land (2007)	Mirror, Mirror (2012)

Professional ratings
Review scores
Source	Rating
Allmusic	3.5/5 stars

La La Land is the second LP by the Louisville-based band Wax Fang. It was originally released on November 17, 2007, by Don't Panic Records. It was re-issued by Absolutely Kosher on May 11, 2010, for vinyl.

== Track listing ==
All songs written by Scott Carney.

No.	Title	Length
1.	"Majestic"	5:37
2.	"World War II (Pt. 2)"	4:13
3.	"At Sea" (instrumental)	2:47
4.	"Cannibal Summer"	3:45
5.	"The Doctor Will See You Now"	4:22
6.	"Can You See The Light?"	4:22
7.	"Avant Guardian Angel Dust" (instrumental)	4:48
8.	"Oh, Recklessness"	2:29
9.	"Black & Endless Night Revisited"	5:50
10.	"Wake Up, Sleepyhead!"	9:40
Total length:		47:55

== Personnel ==
- Scott Carney - Guitar, Vocals, Keyboards, Piano, Percussion, Theremin
- Jacob Heustis - Bass Guitar, Keyboards
- Kevin Ratterman - Drums, Keyboards, Percussion

=== Additional musicians ===
- Doug Easley - Pedal Steel, Crying Robot
- Ben Sollee - Cello, Viola
- Cheyenne Mize - Violin
- Heather Floyd - Trumpet
- D.W. Box - Tuba
- David Cronin - Background Vocals
- Corey McAfee - Stomps and Claps
- Sarah Nettleton - Choir
- Anita Streeter - Choir
- Elizabeth Righmyer - Choir
- Naomi Scherich - Choir
- Harvey Turner - Choir
- George Dechurch - Choir
- Robert Adleberg - Choir
- Joe Scherich - Choir

=== Production ===
- Wax Fang - Producer, Mixing
- Kevin Ratterman - Engineer
- Doug Easley - Engineer
- Jason Gilespie - Assistant Engineer
- Mark Nevers - Mixing
- Jim Demain - Mastering

== In popular culture ==
The songs Majestic and At Sea, both from this album, were featured on the 151st episode of American Dad! entitled '"Lost In Space'" in 2013.
