= Dairyland, California =

Dairyland, California may refer to:

- Dairyland, Madera County, California
- Dairyland, Orange County, California, renamed La Palma in 1965
