= Ragland =

Ragland may refer to:

== Location ==
- Ragland, Alabama
- Ragland, West Virginia

== People ==
- Doria Ragland (born 1956), mother of Meghan, Duchess of Sussex
- Hilda Pinnix-Ragland (born 1955), American business executive
- Joe Ragland (born 1989), American-Liberian basketball player
- Robert O. Ragland (1931–2012), American film score composer
- Thomas Ragland (fl. 1563), English MP
- Tom Ragland (born 1946), American baseball player

== See also ==
- Raglan (disambiguation)
