= Raglan Road =

Raglan Road can refer to:

- "On Raglan Road," an Irish song based on a poem by Patrick Kavanagh
- Raglan Road (street), a street in Dublin that gave the poem its name
