= Adventureland =

Adventureland may refer to:

== Amusement parks ==
- Adventureland (Disney), an area or "themed land" in several Disney theme parks
- Adventureland (Illinois), a defunct amusement park located in Addison, Illinois, US
- Adventureland (Iowa), located in Altoona, Iowa, US
- Adventureland (New York), located in East Farmingdale, New York, US
- Adventureland (United Arab Emirates), located in Sharjah, UAE

== Others ==
- Adventureland (film), a 2009 comedy written and directed by Greg Mottola
- Adventureland (video game), a text adventure computer game by Scott Adams
- Adventureland, a virtual pinball table in the 2017 video game Pinball FX 3
- Adventureland (train), a Burlington Route passenger train from Kansas City, Missouri to Billings, Montana
