= Raglan (surname) =

As a surname, Raglan may refer to:

- Charlie Raglan (born 1993), English footballer
- Clare Raglan (1927–2002), Canadian National Hockey League player
- Herb Raglan (born 1967), Canadian National Hockey League player, son of the above
- James Raglan (1901–1961), British actor
- Robert Raglan (1906–1985), British actor
