= Summerland =

Summerland may refer to:

== Film and television ==
- Summerland (2010 film), an Icelandic film
- Summerland (2020 film), a British film
- Summerland (TV series), a 2004–2005 American drama series

== Literature ==
- Summerland (Chabon novel), a 2002 novel by Michael Chabon
- Summerland (Rajaniemi novel), a 2018 novel by Hannu Rajaniemi

== Music ==
- Summerland (album), by the Herd, 2008
- Summerland Tour, an annual music festival founded by Art Alexakis of Everclear
- Summerland, an album by Coleman Hell, 2016
- "Summerland", a song by Everclear from Sparkle and Fade, 1995
- "Summerland", a song by Florida Georgia Line from Dig Your Roots, 2016
- "Summerland", a song by King's X from Gretchen Goes to Nebraska, 1989
- Summerland, the second part of the 1935 piano suite Three Visions by William Grant Still
- "Summerland", a song by Half Alive from Conditions of a Punk, 2022

== Places ==
Australia

- Summerland Peninsula, a peninsula on Phillip Island, Victoria
- Summerlands, Victoria, a former residential subdivision on Summerland Peninsula
- Summerland Point, a suburb in New South Wales
- Summerland Way, a state route in New South Wales

Canada

- Summerland, British Columbia, a town

New Zealand

- An old name for part of Western Heights, Auckland

United Kingdom

- Summerlands, Cumbria, England

United States

- Summerland, California, an unincorporated community
  - Summerland Oil Field, an inactive offshore oil field
- Summerland Key, an island and unincorporated community in the Florida Keys
- Summerland, Mississippi, an unincorporated community

== Sports ==
- Summerland Australian Football League, a 1984–2011 Australian rules football competition in New South Wales
- Summerland Buckaroos, later Kelowna Buckaroos, a defunct junior ice hockey team in Kelowna, British Columbia, Canada
- Summerland Steam, a junior ice hockey team in Summerland, British Columbia
- Summerland Sting, a defunct junior ice hockey team in Summerland, British Columbia

== Other uses ==
- Summerland disaster, a 1973 fire in an entertainment complex on the Isle of Man
- Summerland Secondary School, Summerland, British Columbia, Canada
- The Summerland, the afterlife in several religions
- Theodore Summerland (1853–1919), American politician
