= Precipitous Bluff =

Mountain in Tasmania, Australia

- Location within Tasmania

Highest point
- Elevation: 1,145 m (3,757 ft)
- Prominence: 415 m (1,362 ft)
- Coordinates: 43°28′00″S 146°36′00″E

Geography
- Location: Tasmania, Australia
- Parent range: Southern Ranges

Precipitous Bluff or PB is a mountain in the South West Wilderness of Tasmania located north east of New River lagoon.

== Geology and Geography ==
It is visible from the South Coast Track and the Moonlight Ridge walk with a prominence of over 400m consisting of columnar Jurassic dolerite rock. It is rich in Ordovician Carbonates and limestone in the area was briefly under threat by mining in the 1970s. There were also logging threats until it became part of the Southwest National Park.

Archaeological and cave features, together with cave fauna were investigated during the Franklin Dam controversy but were criticised for being politically influenced.

== Access ==
PB can be accessed from either the South Coast track to the south, or the Moonlight ridge track to the north east. It is a 2-day walk from the coast track including a lengthy wade through New River Lagoon, or a multi-day hike across the more inland ridges.
