= William Franklin (Ireland) =

Irish politician and soldier

- Occupations: Politician; soldier

Sir William Franklin was an Irish politician and soldier of the seventeenth century.

A landowning Protestant with property in and around Carrickfergus, Franklin was a leading opponent of the Catholic King James II and his Irish deputy the Earl Tyrconnell. When Protestants in Ulster began organising resistance against James following the 1688 Glorious Revolution Franklin joined the Council of the North, which assumed control of the resistance movement. As the growing rebellion developed into the War of the Two Kings, the Council raised regiments of Protestant volunteers who formed the Army of the North. Franklin was chosen to lead an infantry regiment. Although Franklin had planned to go to England, he stayed to assume his military duties. He was one of the leaders of a failed attempt to seize Carrickfergus from its Irish Army garrison in February 1689

After the heavy defeat suffered by the Army of the North at the Break of Dromore, Franklin went to London where he appealed to Parliament for support for the Irish Protestants. However he testified that the Army of the North was much stronger than it actually was. During the summer the Protestants were besieged in Derry with the Enniskillen garrison the only other to hold out. The same year a relief force under General Percy Kirke came to the aid of both Derry and Enniskillen. Shortly afterwards an expeditionary force under Marshal Schomberg was able to capture Carrickfergus. The remains of the Army of North was incorporated into the Williamite army, although Franklin appears to have received no position in it.

His house in Carrickfergus was chosen as William of Orange's residence in 1690 when the King landed at the town before beginning the campaign that led to his victory at the Battle of Boyne. It is believed he later settled in the Limerick/Clare area due to mentions of his support for a more avid Protestant ascendancy in the south of Ireland.

== Bibliography ==
- Childs, John. The Williamite War in Ireland, 1688-1691. Continuum, 2007.
