= Brackenlands =

Coordinates: 54.81°N 03.16°W

- Location in Allerdale, Cumbria Location within Cumbria
- OS grid reference: NY2547
- Civil parish: Wigton
- Unitary authority: Cumberland
- Ceremonial county: Cumbria
- Region: North West
- Country: England
- Sovereign state: United Kingdom
- Post town: WIGTON
- Postcode district: CA7
- Dialling code: 01697
- Police: Cumbria
- Fire: Cumbria
- Ambulance: North West
- UK Parliament: Penrith and Solway

Brackenlands is an area of Wigton in Cumbria, England.

Urban planner Thomas Adams laid out a co-partnership estate at Brackenlands for lawyer J. S. Barkett around 1909.
