= Brockhollands =

Hamlet in Gloucestershire, England

Coordinates: 51.7465°N 2.5573°W

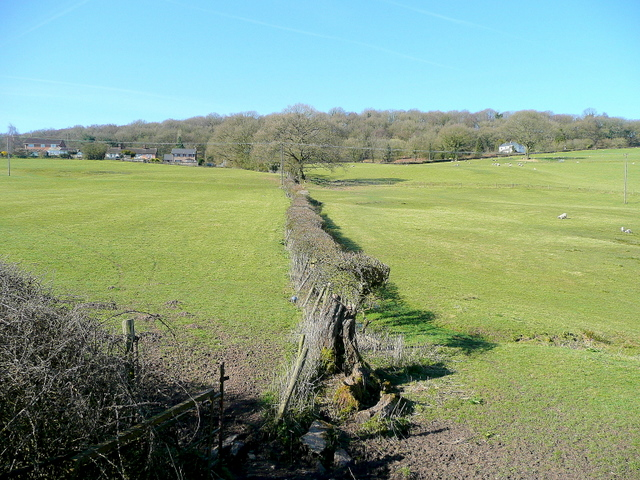
- Fields at Brockhollands

- Location within Gloucestershire
- OS grid reference: SO616054
- District: Forest of Dean
- Shire county: Gloucestershire
- Region: South West
- Country: England
- Sovereign state: United Kingdom
- Police: Gloucestershire
- Fire: Gloucestershire
- Ambulance: South Western
- UK Parliament: Forest of Dean

Brockhollands is a hamlet located in the Forest of Dean. It lies between the village of Bream and the town of Lydney in Gloucestershire. It is an obscure and small area with around 30 houses and is relatively unknown even in the local area. With its only attributes being the local sheep farm, it rarely sees any tourism but is frequently driven through by those going up to Bream.

== History ==
Brockhollands has been proposed as the possible location of the "Pwll Brochwel", the supposed location that the Saxon army retreated to after the battle against Tewdrig and Meurig at Rhyd Tintern in the sixth century.

A farmhouse was recorded from 1578 at Brockhollands. The hamlet of Brockhollands formed in the 19th century north-west of the ancient farmstead. There was mining in the area, and in the early 1930s a miners' welfare committee built a small hall at Brockhollands.
