= Jane Frankland =

English author and cybersecurity specialist

Jane Anna-Louise Frankland
- Born: April 1968
- Occupations: Author, cybersecurity expert

Jane Frankland MBE (born April 1968) is an English cybersecurity expert, entrepreneur, and author. She is the founder of "IN security Movement" and author of a book, In Security-Why a failure to attract and retain women in cybersecurity is making us all less safe.

Frankland has a degree in art and design. Before entering cybersecurity, she worked as a freelance textile designer. When she became pregnant with her first child, she moved to a career in sales to increase her income to support herself as a single mother. In 1997 a boyfriend who worked in technology suggested they start a cyber security consultancy business together. She later sold the business to her partner. In 2015, she read a study that reported the representation of women in the industry had been declining and started writing about women in the industry, which turned into a book deal. She worked with TechTalent Academy, a Birmingham organization that provides technological training to women and minorities. She started another company, KnewStart, to provide consultancy to successful startups looking to increase their scale.

In June 2018, after she made comments criticizing the use of "booth babes" at industry events, she was the subject of backlash on social media. When she wrote about the experience, she was contacted by women who had experienced sexual harassment or assault at such events and whose complaints to event organizers had been dismissed. Frankland developed a set of recommended policies around sexual harassment for industry events.

== Honours ==
Frankland was awarded an MBE in the King's New Years Honours list published on December 31, 2024, for services to Women in Cyber Security as the director of Knewstart.
