= Askeland =

Askeland may refer to:

== Places ==
- Askeland, Lindås, a village in Alver municipality, Vestland county, Norway (formerly in Lindås municipality, Hordaland county, Norway)
- Askeland, Radøy, a village in Alver municipality, Vestland county, Norway (formerly in Radøy municipality, Hordaland county, Norway)
- Askeland, Osterøy, a village in Osterøy municipality, Vestland county, Norway

== People ==
- Edvard Askeland, Norwegian jazz musician
- Erika Askeland, American politician

== See also ==
- Askland
- Askeladd
