= Mansfelder Land =

Mansfelder Land may refer to the following places in Germany:

- Mansfelder Land (district), a former county in the state of Saxony-Anhalt
- Mansfeld Land (German: Mansfelder Land), a region in Saxony-Anhalt
