= Vineland (disambiguation) =

Vineland may refer to:

- Vinland, the Viking colony in North America
- Vineland, a novel by Thomas Pynchon
- The Vinelander, a former train service in Victoria, Australia

== Places ==
=== Canada ===
- Vineland, Ontario

=== United States ===
- Vineland, Alabama
- Vineland, Colorado
- Vineland, Florida
  - Apopka-Vineland Road, several roads in Orange County, Florida
- Vineland, Minnesota
- Vineland Township, Polk County, Minnesota
- Vineland, Missouri
- Vineland, New Jersey
  - Vineland Senior High School North, a public high school
  - Vineland Senior High School South, a public high school
- Clarkston Heights-Vineland, Washington
