= Cloverland, Douglas County, Wisconsin =

Cloverland, Wisconsin
- Town
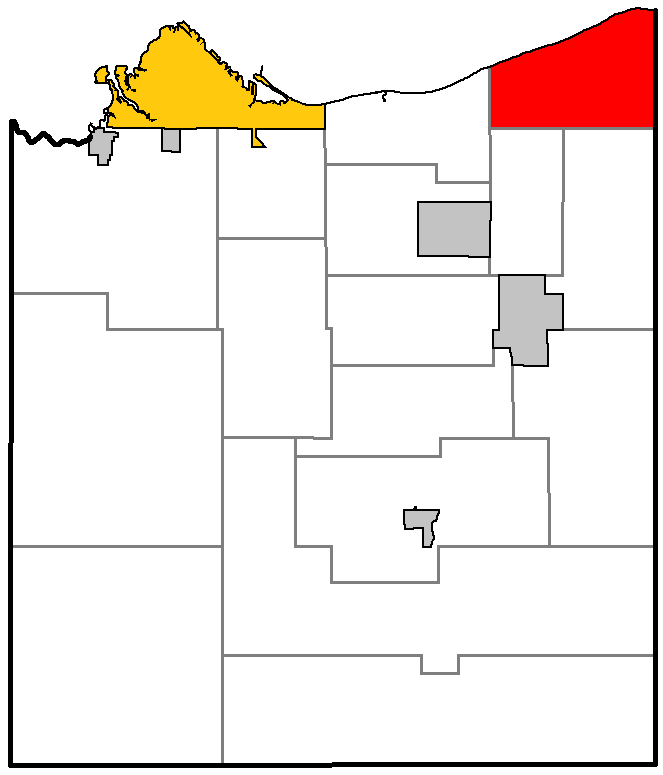
- Location of Cloverland, within Douglas County
- Coordinates: 46°41′58″N 91°37′44″W
- Country: United States
- State: Wisconsin
- County: Douglas

Area
  - Total: 46.2 sq mi (119.6 km^{2})
  - Land: 46.2 sq mi (119.6 km^{2})
  - Water: 0 sq mi (0.0 km^{2})
- Elevation: 758 ft (231 m)

Population (2020)
  - Total: 249
  - Density: 5.39/sq mi (2.08/km^{2})
- Time zone: UTC-6 (Central (CST))
  - Summer (DST): UTC-5 (CDT)
- Area codes: 715 and 534
- FIPS code: 55-15825
- GNIS feature ID: 1582988
- Website: https://townofcloverland.wi.gov/

Cloverland is a town in Douglas County, Wisconsin, United States. The population was 249 at the 2020 census. The unincorporated community of Cloverland is located in the town.

== Transportation ==
Wisconsin Highway 13 serves the town.

== Geography ==
According to the United States Census Bureau, the town has a total area of 46.2 square miles (119.6 km^{2}), all land. Geographically, the Brule River divides the town in two.

== Demographics ==
As of the census of 2000, there were 247 people, 94 households, and 64 families residing in the town. The population density was 5.3 people per square mile (2.1/km^{2}). There were 111 housing units at an average density of 2.4 per square mile (0.9/km^{2}). The racial makeup of the town was 97.17% White, 1.21% Native American, 0.81% Asian, 0.40% from other races, and 0.40% from two or more races. Hispanic or Latino of any race were 0.81% of the population.

There were 94 households, out of which 29.8% had children under the age of 18 living with them, 59.6% were married couples living together, 4.3% had a female householder with no husband present, and 30.9% were non-families. 23.4% of all households were made up of individuals, and 9.6% had someone living alone who was 65 years of age or older. The average household size was 2.63 and the average family size was 3.17.

In the town, the population was spread out, with 28.7% under the age of 18, 7.3% from 18 to 24, 26.3% from 25 to 44, 23.9% from 45 to 64, and 13.8% who were 65 years of age or older. The median age was 38 years. For every 100 females, there were 104.1 males. For every 100 females age 18 and over, there were 100.0 males.

The median income for a household in the town was $35,000, and the median income for a family was $36,250. Males had a median income of $31,042 versus $33,125 for females. The per capita income for the town was $16,220. About 4.2% of families and 7.5% of the population were below the poverty line, including 15.2% of those under the age of eighteen and none of those 65 or over.
