= Cloverland, Vilas County, Wisconsin =

Cloverland, Wisconsin
- Town
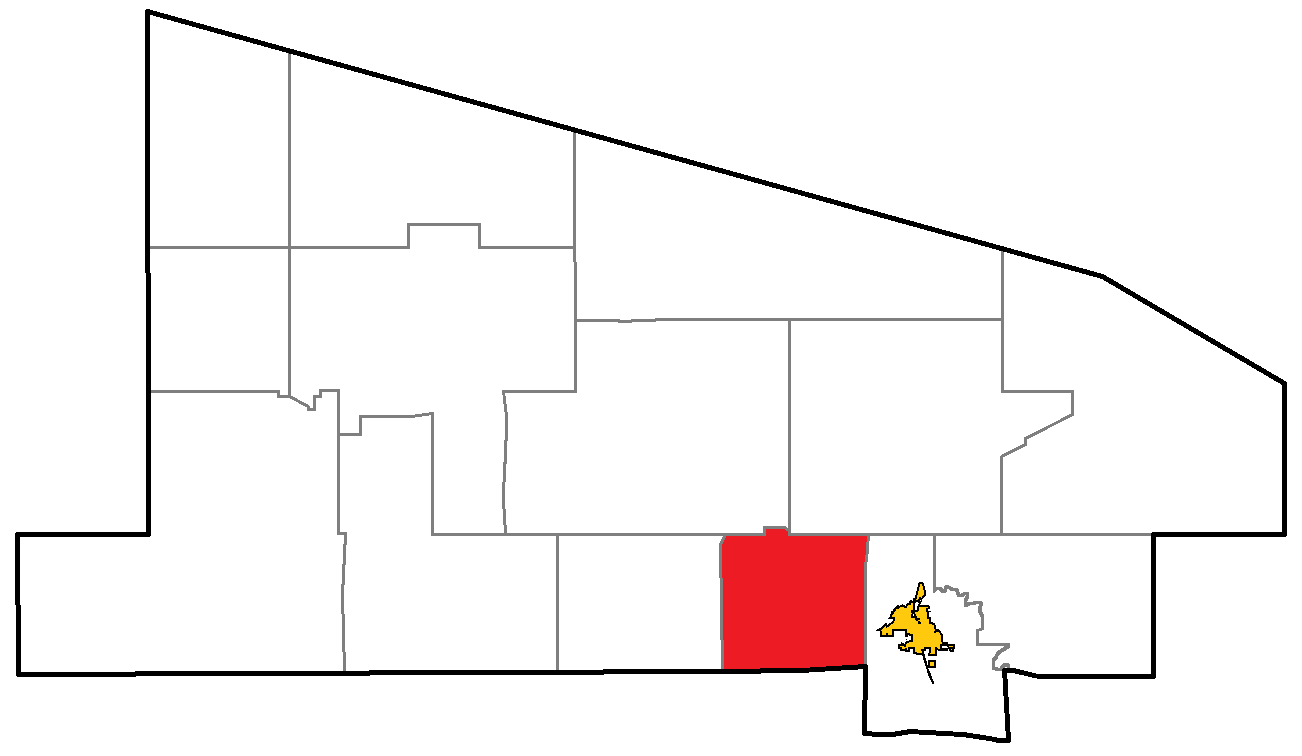
- Location of Cloverland, within Vilas County
- Coordinates: 45°56′27″N 89°22′29″W
- Country: United States
- State: Wisconsin
- County: Vilas

Area
  - Total: 35.2 sq mi (91.1 km^{2})
  - Land: 31.4 sq mi (81.3 km^{2})
  - Water: 3.8 sq mi (9.9 km^{2})
- Elevation: 1,637 ft (499 m)

Population (2020)
  - Total: 1,068
  - Density: 34.0/sq mi (13.1/km^{2})
- Time zone: UTC-6 (Central (CST))
  - Summer (DST): UTC-5 (CDT)
- Area codes: 715 & 534
- FIPS code: 55-15850
- GNIS feature ID: 1582989
- Website: https://townofcloverland.wi.gov/

Cloverland is a town in Vilas County, Wisconsin, United States. The population was 1,068 at the 2020 census.

== Geography ==
According to the United States Census Bureau, the town has a total area of 35.2 square miles (91.1 km^{2}), of which 31.4 square miles (81.3 km^{2}) is land and 3.8 square miles (9.8 km^{2}) (10.80%) is water.

== Demographics ==
As of the census of 2000, there were 919 people, 416 households, and 301 families residing in the town. The population density was 29.3 people per square mile (11.3/km^{2}). There were 936 housing units at an average density of 29.8 per square mile (11.5/km^{2}). The racial makeup of the town was 98.26% White, 0.22% African American, 0.76% Asian, 0.11% from other races, and 0.65% from two or more races. Hispanic or Latino of any race were 0.98% of the population.

There were 416 households, out of which 21.2% had children under the age of 18 living with them, 65.1% were married couples living together, 5.0% had a female householder with no husband present, and 27.6% were non-families. 23.1% of all households were made up of individuals, and 11.3% had someone living alone who was 65 years of age or older. The average household size was 2.21 and the average family size was 2.60.

In the town, the population was spread out, with 16.8% under the age of 18, 3.3% from 18 to 24, 22.7% from 25 to 44, 33.2% from 45 to 64, and 24.0% who were 65 years of age or older. The median age was 50 years. For every 100 females, there were 95.5 males. For every 100 females age 18 and over, there were 94.7 males.

The median income for a household in the town was $33,897, and the median income for a family was $41,731. Males had a median income of $30,682 versus $23,882 for females. The per capita income for the town was $19,912. About 6.2% of families and 7.1% of the population were below the poverty line, including 8.8% of those under age 18 and 8.7% of those age 65 or over.
