= William Frankland =

William Frankland may refer to:

- William Frankland (died 1640), of Thirkleby, MP for Thirsk during the reign of Charles I
- Sir William Frankland, 1st Baronet (c. 1640–1697), of Thirkleby, English politician, MP for Thirsk
- William Frankland (died 1714), FRS, son of Sir Thomas Frankland, 2nd Baronet
- William Frankland (1720–1805), East India Company merchant and MP for Thirsk
- William Frankland (1761–1816), English politician and Lord Commissioner of the Admiralty
- William Howard Frankland (1901–1980), American businessman
- William Frankland (allergist) (1912–2020), British allergist and immunologist
