= South West Wilderness =

Wilderness region of Tasmania, Australia

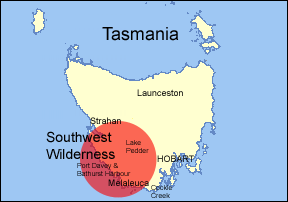
Approximate area of the South West Wilderness of Tasmania

The South West Wilderness of Tasmania, Australia is a remote and inaccessible region of South West Tasmania containing unspoilt scenery, rugged peaks, wild rivers, unique flora and fauna, and a long and rugged coastline. Parts of the wilderness are more than 50 km from the nearest road, so the only access to the area is by foot, air or sea.

It has been known by a variety of names over the last century, and the label has been affected by a number of threats to the region. For some the term The Southwest has been the usual term, while recent maps and tourism promotion material have identified it variously including the Southwest Wilderness and South-West Wilderness.

== History ==
Evidence has been found of human habitation in the South West Wilderness area going back at least 25,000 years. The coastal area was shared by four Tasmanian Aboriginal tribes for at least the last 3,000 years.

The coast of the area was mapped by Captain James Cook in 1777 as part of his third voyage of discovery aboard HMS Resolution, though this was not a focus of the voyage. It was undoubtedly sighted by earlier European voyagers, but little attempt appears to have been made to land.

The Aboriginal people were removed from the region during the 1830s by George Augustus Robinson, acting under the policies of the local colonial British government.

During the 19th century, as Europeans colonised other parts of Australia and Tasmania, this area was found to be harsh and inhospitable. Limited numbers of sealers, whalers, miners and timber-getters based themselves in the area.

In 1955 Lake Pedder National Park was proclaimed. Over the following 35 years the park was gradually extended, and was renamed the Southwest National Park, finally reaching its present size in 1990. As detailed below, the Southwest National Park forms the bulk of the South West Wilderness.

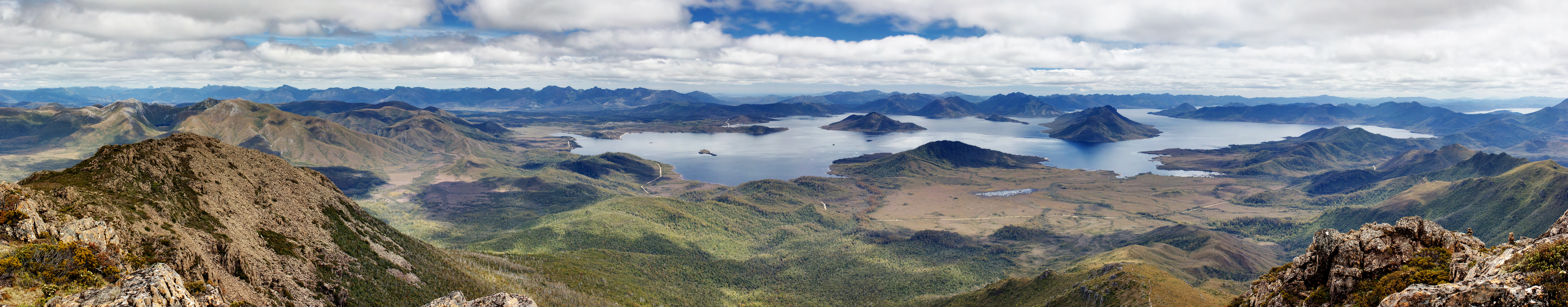
Lake Pedder from Mount Eliza, Southwest National Park, Australia

== World Heritage Area ==
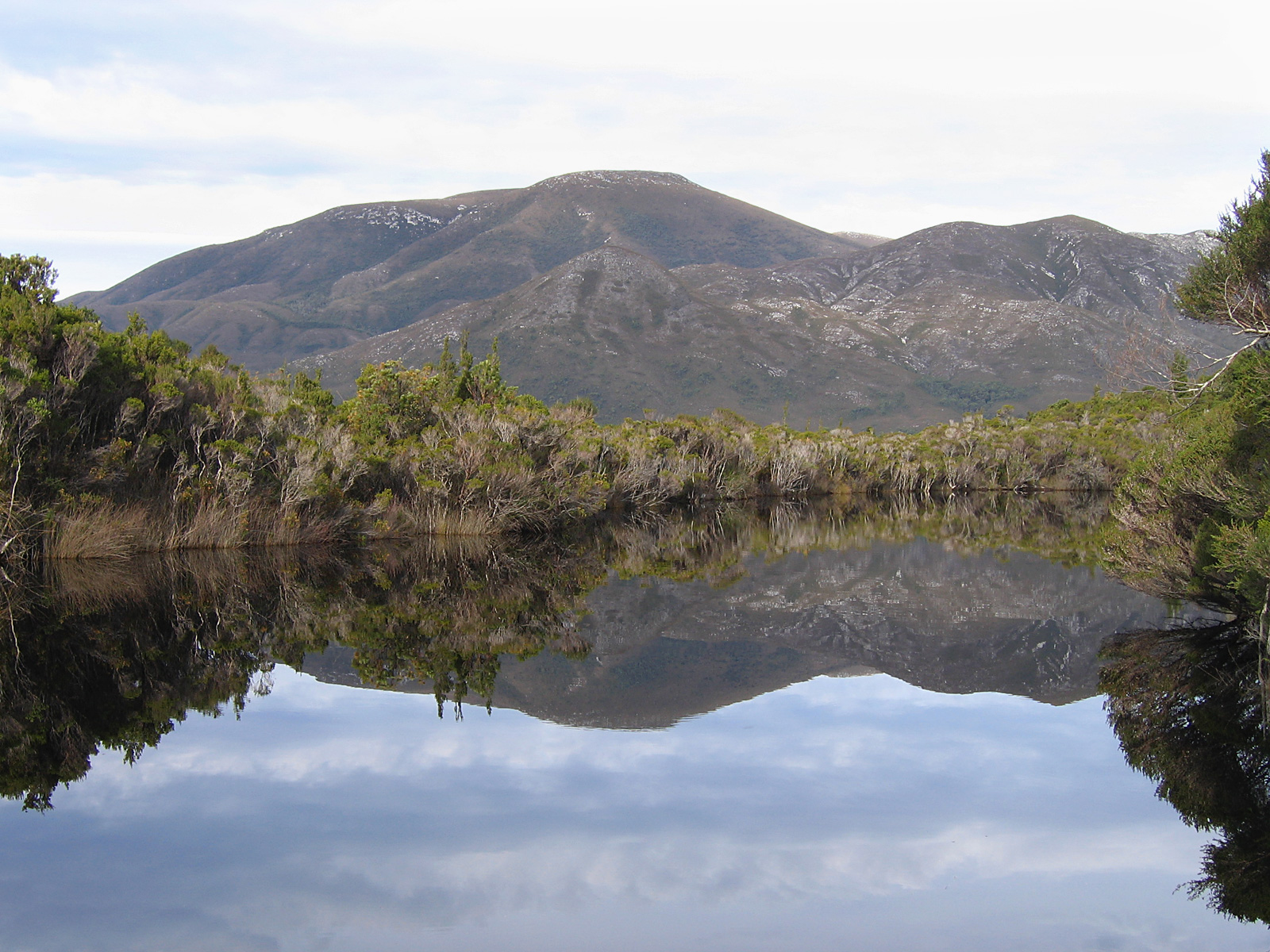
Reflections on the rivulet from Deny King's boathouse

Map of Southwest National Park

The South West Wilderness is an important part of the Tasmanian Wilderness World Heritage Site, and is therefore regarded as containing "superlative natural phenomena or areas of exceptional natural beauty and aesthetic importance".

The South West Wilderness is largely composed of the Southwest National Park, Tasmania's largest National Park, which at 6,052.13 km² is larger than many small countries.

The Southwest National Park is part of a continuous chain of five National Parks, along with the Hartz Mountains National Park, the Franklin-Gordon Wild Rivers National Park, the Cradle Mountain-Lake St Clair National Park, and the Walls of Jerusalem National Park. Together these five parks cover almost a quarter of Tasmania's land mass and, along with a few other smaller parks and areas, form the World Heritage Area. Sections of some of these other National Parks can also be considered part of the South West Wilderness.

== Geology and geography ==
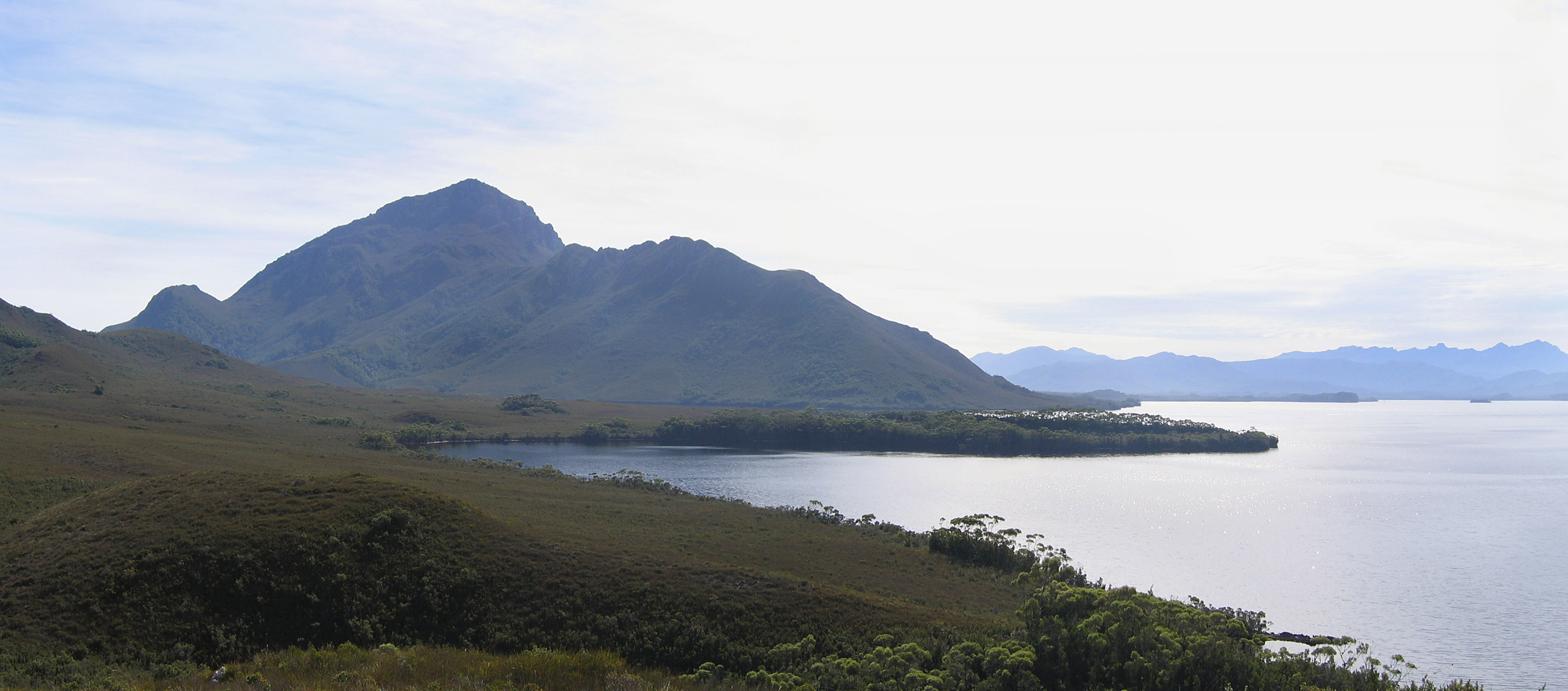
Mount Rugby on the shores of Bathurst Harbour

The South West Wilderness has a preponderance of dolerite and quartzite rock, with very little soil coverage over much of its area. This largely contributes to the observed features of the landscape, and the low utility of the area for agriculture or forestry. The remoteness, ruggedness and infertility is largely what led to its being unsuitable for settlement.

It displays extensive mountain ridges and steep valleys, with deep mountain lakes and extensive wild moor-lands. Much of its landscape has been sculpted by relatively recent glaciation events. The wilderness area also contains the immense Port Davey and Bathurst Harbour, which combined cover an area of 170 square kilometres, more than three times the size of Sydney Harbour.

Melaleuca is a tiny settlement on Bathurst Harbour, consisting of one currently inhabited house, an historic house formerly inhabited by Tasmanian naturalist Deny King, a crushed quartz rock airstrip, and some basic National Park facilities including a bird hide, information centre and signage, and toilets. Its current permanent population is just two.

Some key geographic features include the Arthur Range, South Picton Range, Frankland Range and Ray Range. Notable peaks include Mount Rugby on Bathurst Harbour, Mount Melaleuca, Mount Anne, Precipitous Bluff, and Federation Peak. Rivers in, or that have their headwaters in the South West Wilderness, include the Davey River, the Franklin and Gordon Rivers, and the Huon River.

== Flora and fauna ==
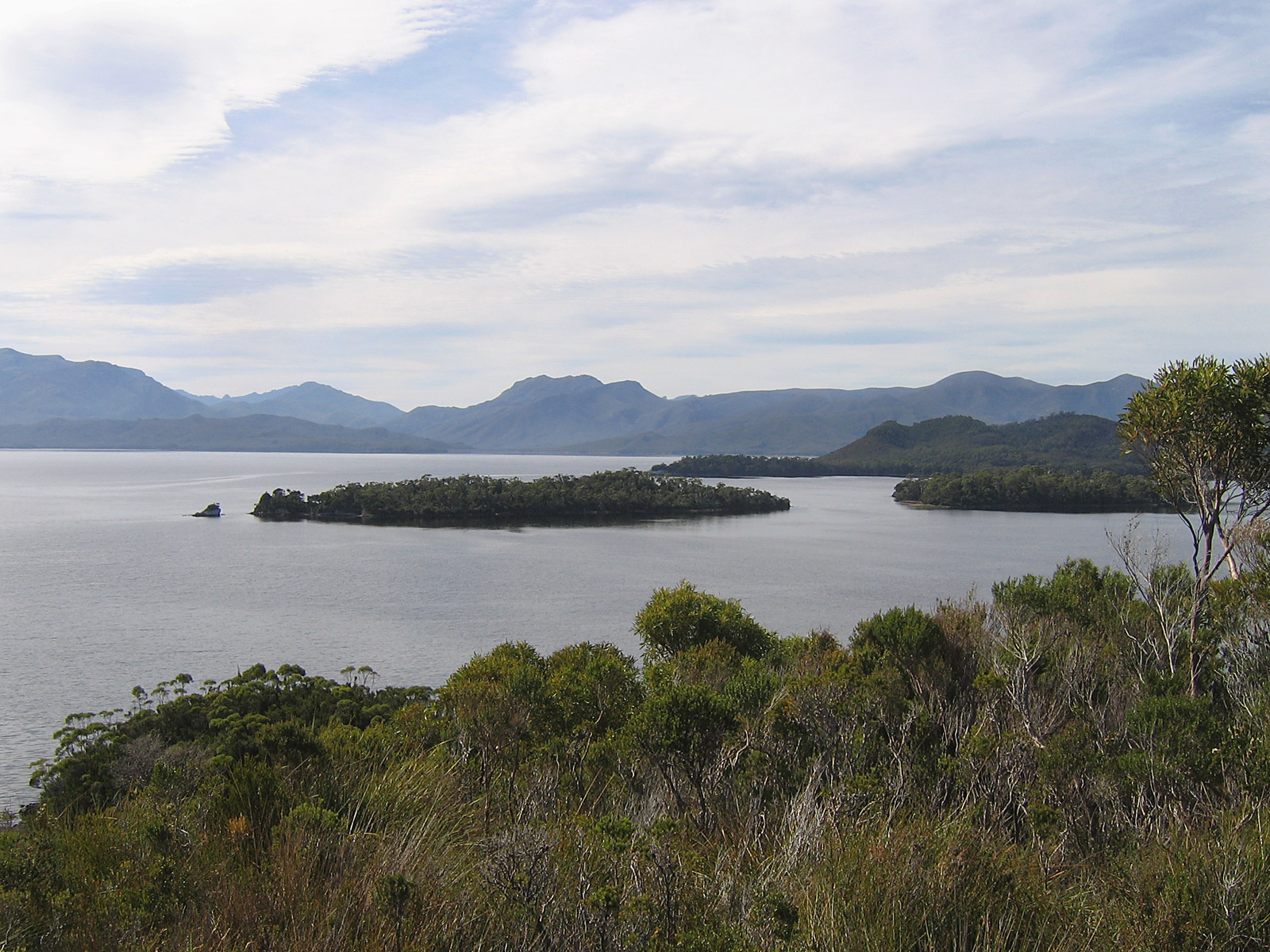
The Celery-Top Islands on Bathurst Harbour are crowded with celery-top pines

In the more fertile areas dense forests of eucalyptus, southern sassafras and myrtle beech, acacia (wattle), and leatherwood (Eucryphia lucida) are found, with low growing ferns, climbing heath, bauera, mosses and lichen. In sheltered wet patches, stands of temperate rainforest still exist.

The region is also host to specimens and stands of unique and ancient Huon pines, which are extremely slow growing but can live for thousands of years and form one of the most durable timbers on Earth, as well as the fascinating celery-top pines (Phyllocladus aspleniifolius).

The exposed and more infertile areas, particularly around the extreme south-west, consist largely of low growing native grasses such as the unusual buttongrass, heaths, and hardy melaleucas. These plants grow right to the water's edge, and stain the pure unpolluted water the colour of tea.

Fauna are typically Tasmanian, though population densities are not high, especially in the more infertile areas. Due to its remoteness, the wilderness is touted by some as a possible place for a breeding population of thylacines (Tasmanian tigers) to have survived since their official extinction in 1936, though most authorities would agree that areas in north-west Tasmania such as the Tarkine wilderness are more likely, as this region provides more suitable habitat and more prey for the thylacine.

Rivers can be rich with fish, such as giant trout, as the area is not overfished by humans. Bird life can be varied, including rosellas, honeyeaters, native wrens and robins, thornbills and currawongs. The region around Melaleuca is home to summer breeding grounds of the highly endangered orange-bellied parrot.

== Access ==
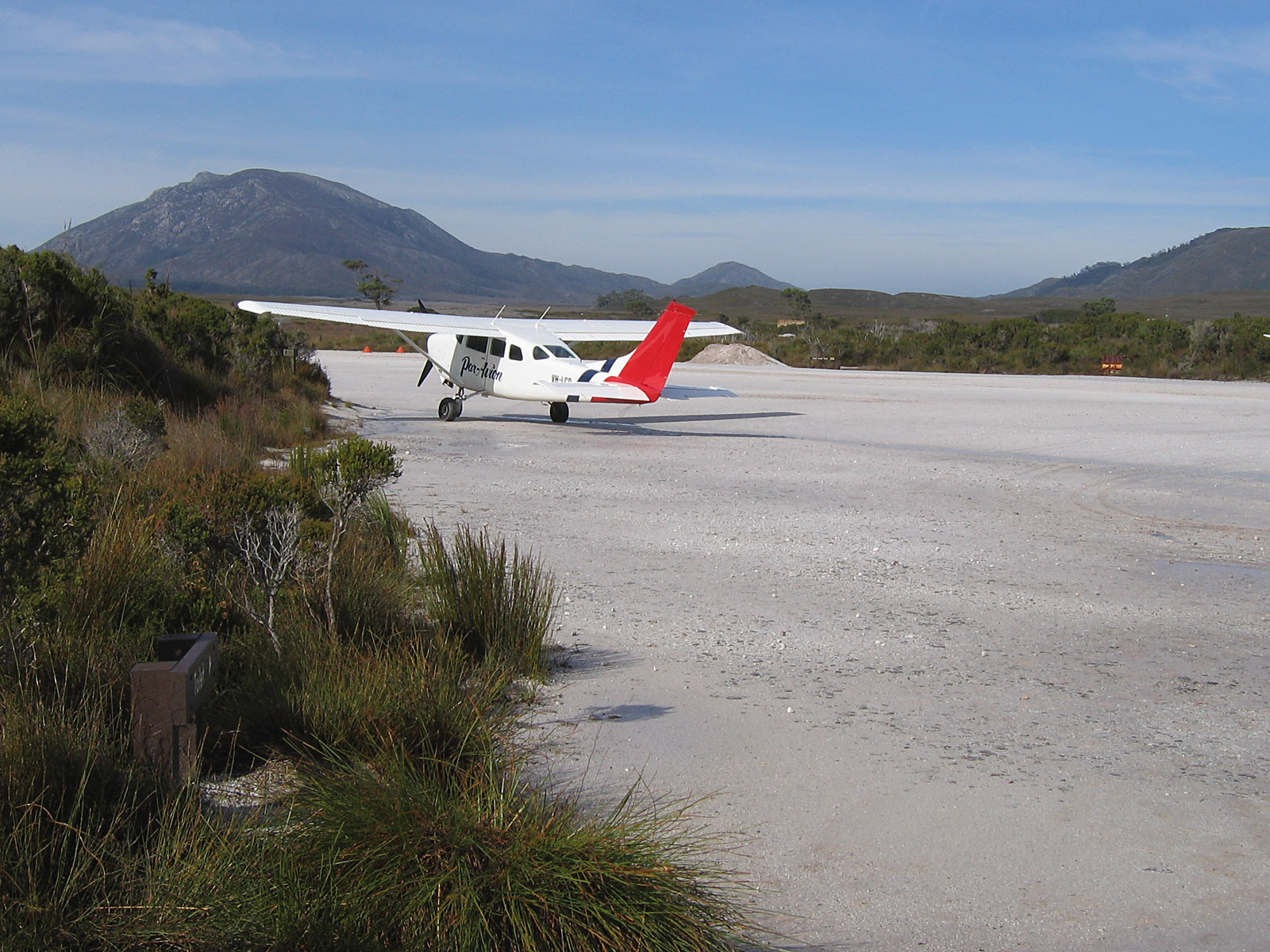
A tourist aircraft prepares for take-off from the Melaleuca airstrip

The South West Wilderness is one of the most remote and inaccessible areas in Australia. No vehicular roads penetrate beyond the edges of the wilderness, so the only access to the south-west of the area is by foot, air or sea.

There are two formal locations for overnight lodgings located on Lake Pedder. The Ted's Beach campground is located 10 km from Strathgordon on the East bank of the lake. The facilities there include electric barbecues supplied by the National Park Service as well as showers and toilets. The Lake Pedder Chalet is located on the west bank of the lake in Strathgordon and offers full hotel amenities with a restaurant and bar which are open for breakfast, lunch, and dinner. Both of these areas have free boat ramps and both are situated conveniently near the start of the Port Davey Track.

Two walking tracks (for very experienced walkers only) cross the wilderness. The 54 km Port Davey Track runs from Lake Pedder to Melaleuca and typically takes four to five days to walk. Lake Pedder itself is 75 km from Hobart via the Gordon River Road.

From Melaleuca the 66 km South Coast Track runs along the southern coast of Tasmania back to Cockle Creek. This section of the walk typically takes between five and nine days. From Cockle Creek at the end of the Huon Highway, the southernmost road in Australia, it is an approximately two-hour drive back to Hobart. There are also some shorter walks that enter the edges of the wilderness from the road access points.

Alternatively an aircraft drop-off and/or pick-up at Melaleuca can be arranged, although air travel into the area is highly dependent upon the rapidly changeable weather. Light aircraft fly on regular tourist flights from Cambridge Aerodrome near Hobart and offer a way to view the South West Wilderness. Flights take about 45 minutes each way.

The only other possible access to the wilderness is by boat. There are no regular tourist operations to the area by sea, though a water trip can be coordinated through the tourist flight operator, as well as it offering overnight accommodation in a standing camp. At least one sea kayak touring outfitter leads extended wilderness tours of Bathurst Harbour, using folding kayaks and departing from Melaleuca.

The area is subject to snow, ice, strong winds, heavy fog and cloud cover at any time of year, but especially in the mid-year months, which means any trip into the wilderness should be taken with caution. Rainfall can be up to 3,000 millimetres (120 in) per year, and the superb views are regularly obscured by low level cloud. This variable and potentially dangerous weather occurs because the wilderness fronts the wild Southern Ocean, where the next landfall is Antarctica to the south and South America to the west.

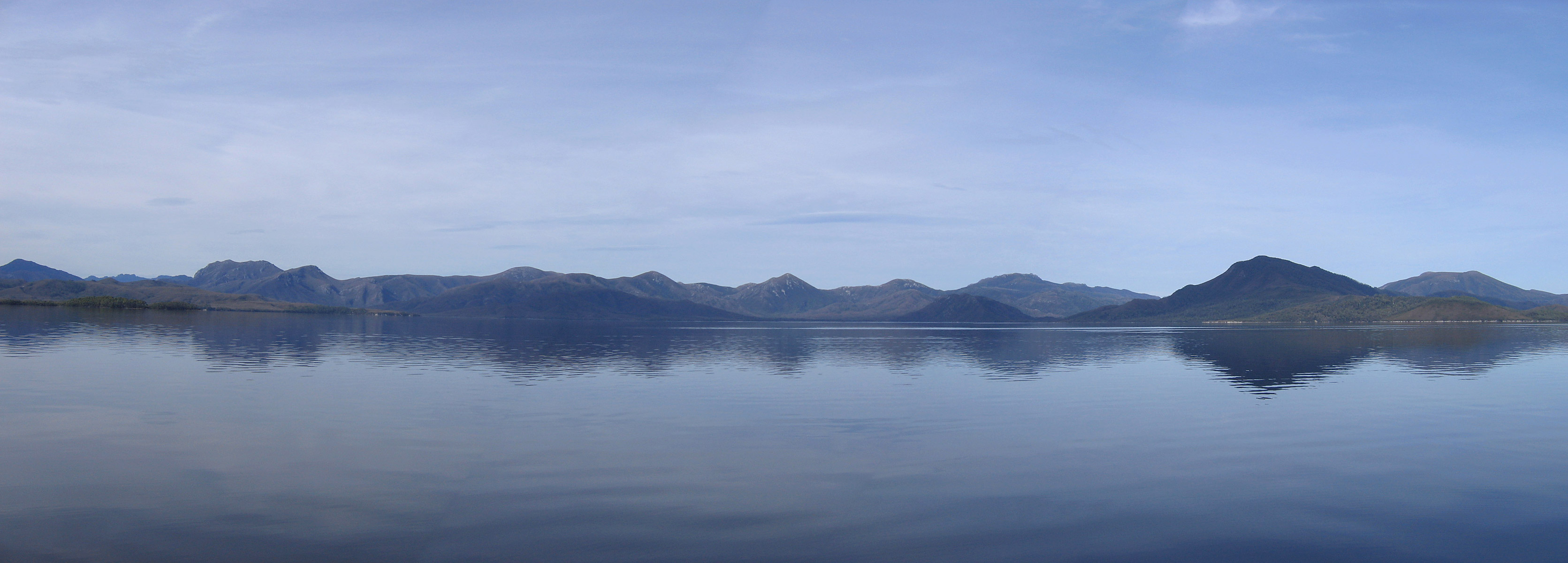
Bathurst Harbour - another view
