= Strathgordon, Tasmania =

Strathgordon
- Town
- Coordinates: 42°46′S 146°03′E
- Country: Australia
- State: Tasmania
- Region: South-east
- LGA: Derwent Valley Council
- Location: 144 km (89 mi) W of Hobart; 57 km (35 mi) W of Maydena; 121 km (75 mi) W of New Norfolk

Government
  - State electorate: Lyons
  - Federal division: Lyons
- Elevation: 322 m (1,056 ft)

Population
  - Total: 8 (Southwest) (2021 census)
- Postcode: 7139
- Mean max temp: 14.1 °C (57.4 °F)
- Mean min temp: 6.3 °C (43.3 °F)
- Annual rainfall: 2,519.6 mm (99.20 in)
Localities around Strathgordon
Southwest	Southwest	Southwest
Southwest	Strathgordon	Southwest
Southwest	Southwest	Southwest

Strathgordon is an old company town built for Hydro-Electric Commission employees work on the dams for the Gordon-Pedder impoundment. It is a tourist destination for visitors wishing to visit the Southwest National Park and World Heritage listed South West Wilderness.

It is remote by Tasmanian standards; the only road access is via the Gordon River Road from Maydena, 70 kilometres (43 mi) away. Fuel can be purchased at the Lake Pedder Wilderness Lodge which also provides accommodation and meals.. The road is maintained by Hydro Tasmania.

== History ==
Strathgordon was the company town for construction by the Hydro-Electric Commission (TAS) of hydroelectric structures in the area, including four dams and one power station, that resulted in damming of Lake Pedder and Lake Gordon. It was gazetted as a locality in 1968, and its post office opened on 16 July 1969. It was at its peak activity in 1972, with retail stores, a school, church, sports complex and indoor swimming pool.

Since the completion of the dams, it's mostly used by trout fishers and bushwalkers and is maintained by Hydro Tasmania.

== Locality ==
It's rural locality in the local government area (LGA) of Derwent Valley. The 2021 census recorded a population of 8 for the state suburb of Southwest, which includes Strathgordon. It is on the road to the Gordon River Dam the most south westerly road in the south west of Tasmania.

== Road infrastructure ==
Route B61 (Gordon River Road) runs through from south-east to south-west.

== Climate ==
Strathgordon has a cold oceanic climate (Cfb) with cool summers and cold winters with crisp nights year round. Rainfall is extremely heavy year round, some of the heaviest in all of Australia. Strathgordon as well as being very wet is also very cloudy for most of the year; it is the cloudiest site in Australia, with only 1,478 sun hours and 16.3 clear days annually.

Snow is a common occurrence in the winter and spring months, and can be heavy in amount, while sleet and wet snow can occur in the summer. On average there are 12.7 snowy days annually.

The station commenced record in 1968 and ceased on 19 March 2021.

Climate data for Strathgordon Village (1968–2021); 322 m AMSL; 42.77° S, 146.05° E
Month	Jan	Feb	Mar	Apr	May	Jun	Jul	Aug	Sep	Oct	Nov	Dec	Year
Record high °C (°F)	36.2 (97.2)	36.3 (97.3)	33.1 (91.6)	27.5 (81.5)	21.1 (70.0)	16.1 (61.0)	17.5 (63.5)	20.8 (69.4)	24.5 (76.1)	27.9 (82.2)	32.0 (89.6)	35.0 (95.0)	36.3 (97.3)
Mean daily maximum °C (°F)	19.3 (66.7)	19.7 (67.5)	17.4 (63.3)	14.2 (57.6)	11.5 (52.7)	9.5 (49.1)	9.0 (48.2)	10.0 (50.0)	11.6 (52.9)	13.5 (56.3)	16.3 (61.3)	17.2 (63.0)	14.1 (57.4)
Mean daily minimum °C (°F)	9.5 (49.1)	9.7 (49.5)	8.6 (47.5)	6.9 (44.4)	5.4 (41.7)	3.8 (38.8)	3.0 (37.4)	3.6 (38.5)	4.4 (39.9)	5.4 (41.7)	7.1 (44.8)	8.2 (46.8)	6.3 (43.3)
Record low °C (°F)	2.8 (37.0)	1.5 (34.7)	1.3 (34.3)	0.0 (32.0)	−1.1 (30.0)	−4.0 (24.8)	−2.5 (27.5)	−3.1 (26.4)	−1.5 (29.3)	−1.3 (29.7)	0.6 (33.1)	1.8 (35.2)	−4.0 (24.8)
Average precipitation mm (inches)	145.4 (5.72)	107.3 (4.22)	149.5 (5.89)	201.6 (7.94)	239.1 (9.41)	213.4 (8.40)	271.8 (10.70)	292.1 (11.50)	277.9 (10.94)	247.2 (9.73)	173.9 (6.85)	198.4 (7.81)	2,519.6 (99.20)
Average precipitation days	17.3	14.1	18.2	20.0	23.0	22.5	25.0	25.3	24.4	22.9	19.3	20.1	252.1
Average afternoon relative humidity (%)	62	61	66	73	79	82	81	75	71	65	62	64	70
Mean monthly sunshine hours	201.5	178.0	145.7	105.0	68.2	51.0	62.0	83.7	102.0	139.5	165.0	176.7	1,478.3
Source: Bureau of Meteorology
