= List of governors of the Bengal Presidency =

In 1644, Gabriel Boughton procured privileges for the East India Company (EIC) which permitted them to build a factory at Hughli, without fortifications. Various chief agents, Governors and presidents were appointed to look after company affairs in the Bengal region. In 1765, the Treaty of Allahabad granted the diwani of Bengal Subah to the EIC. In 1772, Warren Hastings was appointed as the Governor-General of Fort William in Bengal which ended the title of Governor of Bengal.

The Saint Helena Act 1833 enacted that the Governor-General of India shall also act as the Governor of the Bengal presidency. From this time the Governors-General of India held also the separate office of Governor of Bengal, until the year 1854.

The Section 56 of Act 16 & 17 Victoria in 1853 empowered the Court of Directors of EIC to declare that the Governor-General of India shall not be Governor of the Presidency of Fort William in Bengal, but that a separate Governor shall be appointed for such Presidency. Until then, the Governor-General of India in Council will be directed to appoint a Lieutenant Governor of the Presidency of Fort William in Bengal. In 1854, F. J. Halliday was appointed as the first lieutenant governor of the Bengal presidency.

At the Delhi Durbar on 12 December 1911, King George V announced the transfer of the seat of the Government of India from Calcutta to Delhi, the reunification of the five predominantly Bengali-speaking divisions into a Presidency (or province) of Bengal under a governor, the creation of a new province of Bihar and Orissa under a lieutenant-governor, and that Assam Province would be reconstituted under a chief commissioner. On 21 March 1912, Thomas Gibson-Carmichael was appointed the Governor of Bengal. On 22 March the provinces of Bengal, Bihar and Orissa and Assam were constituted.

In 1947, India gained independence from the British Raj, and the new state of West Bengal was formed following the partition of India. C. Rajagopalachari was appointed as the first Governor of West Bengal. When the constitution of India came into effect on 26 January 1950, the office of Governor of West Bengal become a ceremonial position.

== Precursors (1650–1758) ==
=== Agents, chiefs and governors (1650-1699) ===
In 1644 Gabriel Boughton, procured privileges for the East India Company which permitted them to build a factory at Hughli, without fortifications. In 1650, the factories of Balasor and Hughli were united. On 14 December 1650, James Bridgman was appointed as the chief of the factories. However, in 1653, Bridgman left suddenly and Powle Waldegrave assumed his charge.

On 27 February 1657, the company resolved its holdings into four agencies:- Fort St. George, Bantam, Persia, and Hughli. George Gawton was appointed as the Agent of Hughly. Additional three factories in Ballasore, Cassambazar and Pattana were put under the Hughly agency. In 1658, Johnathan Trevisa was appointed as the second to Gawton and was meant to succeed him after the latter's death. On 6 February 1661, the company reduced the Hughly agency under the Fort St. George, and then agent Trevisa was made the "Chief of Factories in the Bay of Bengal". On 24 November 1681, William Hedges was appointed as the "Agent and Governor for the affairs of the East India Company in the Bay of Bengal". On 21 December 1684, William Gyfford who was the President and Governor of Fort St. George was given the additional charge of Bengal due to increasing mismanagement. John Beard was appointed as the "Agent and Chief in the Bay of Bengal" and become the subordinate to Gifford.

Chief of the factories of Balasore and Hughli
Name	Portrait	Took office	Left office	Remarks
James Bridgman		14 December 1650	1653	
Powle Waldegrave		1653	1657	
Agent of Hughly Agency
George Gawton		27 February 1657	11 September 1658	
John Trevisa		11 September 1658	6 February 1661	
Chief of Factories in the Bay of Bengal
John Trevisa		6 February 1661	31 January 1662	
William Blake		31 January 1662	24 January 1668	
Shem Bridges		24 January 1668	7 December 1669	
Henry Powell		7 December 1669	?	
Walter Clavell		~June 1672	7 August 1677	Died in office
Matthias Vincent		7 September 1677	~July 1682 (position superseded)	Deposed in July 1682
Agent and Governor for the affairs of the East India Company in the Bay of Bengal
Sir William Hedges		24 November 1681	~ August 1684	Deposed in August 1864
Agent and Chief in the Bay of Bengal
John Beard		21 December 1863	28 August 1865	Died in office
Job Charnock		~ April 1686	10 January 1693	Died in office
Francis Ellis		10 January 1693	January 1694	
Charles Eyre		25 January 1694	1 February 1699	Left for England in 1699
John Beard		1 February 1699	20 December 1699 (position superseded)	Second to Eyre

=== President and Governor of Fort William, in Bengal (1699-1705) ===
On 20 December 1699, the Court of Directors (London East India Company) declared Bengal a Presidency, and then Agent Charles Eyre was made the " President and Governor of Fort William, in Bengal". The President or Chief in the Bay of Bengal for the English East India Company was Sir Edward Littleton in whose commission and instructions, dated 12 January 1698, it was also stated that power had been obtained from his Majesty to constitute him the "Minister or Consul for the English Nation" with all powers requisite thereunto." Littleton was later deposed by the Court of Directors in 1703.

The union of the two East India Companies took place on 23 July 1702. For united trade in Bengal, a Council was appointed, of which Nathaniel Halsey and Robert Hedges were to take chair each in their week alternatively as per the dispatch from United Company on 26 February 1702. In a dispatch of 12 February 1704, it was ordered that if Beard shall die, no one will be appointed as President to succeed him. After the departure of John Beard to Madras, Ralph Sheldon assumed the position of Chief of Council, and his appointment was confirmed in a dispatch of 7 February 1706.

President and Governor of Fort William, in Bengal
Name	Portrait	Took office	Left office	Remarks
Sir Charles Eyre		20 December 1699	7 January 1701	Left on account of health issues
John Beard		7 January 1701	7 July 1705	Died in Office

=== President in the Bay, and Governor and Commander-in-Chief for Fort William, in Bengal (1705-1774) ===
On 30 December 1709, Anthony Weldon was appointed as the "President in the Bay, and Governor and Commander-in-Chief for Fort William, in Bengal" for the United East India Company. His appointment was later revoked and was supposed to be succeeded by Sheldon. Since Sheldon had died by the time dispatch arrived in Bengal, John Russell was ordered to succeed as the Governor. By a letter of 8 May 1771, the Court appointed Warren Hastings to be Governor of Bengal. By Act of Parliament 13 Geo. III., cap. 63, the Presidency of Fort William in Bengal will headed by a Governor-General, and Hastings was appointed as the first Governor-General. He assumed the office on 20 October 1774.

President in the Bay, and Governor and Commander-in-Chief for Fort William, in Bengal
#	Name	Portrait	Took office	Left office	Remarks	Appointee
1	Anthony Weldon		30 December 1709	4 March 1711	Appointment revoked by the Court of Directors Resigned in March 1711	East India; Company
2	John Rusell		4 March 1711	3 December 1713	Dismissed by the Court	East India; Company
3	Robert Hedges		3 December 1713	28 December 1717	died in office	East India; Company
4	Samuel Feake		12 January 1718	17 January 1723	Left for England due to illness	East India; Company
5	John Deane		17 January 1723	30 January 1726	Returned to England	East India; Company
6	Henry Frankland		30 January 1726	25 February 1732	Returned to Europe	East India; Company
7	John Stackhouse		25 February 1732	29 January 1739	Resigned	East India; Company
8	Thomas Broddyll		29 January 1739	4 Feb 1746	Left for England	East India; Company
9	John Forster		4 Feb 1746	March 1748	Died in office	East India; Company
10	William Barwell		18 April 1748	1749	Dismissed by the Court	East India; Company
11	Adam Dawson		17 July 1749	1752	Dismissed by the Court	East India; Company
12	William Fytche		5 July 1752	8 August 1752	Died in Office	East India; Company
13	Roger Drake		8 August 1752	20 June 1758	Deposed by the Court	East India; Company
14	Colonel Robert Clive		27 June 1758	23 January 1760	Resigned	East India; Company
15	John Zephaniah Holwell		28 January 1760	27 July 1760	Handed over to Vansittart who was appointed on 23 November 1759 to the office	East India; Company
16	Henry Vansittart		27 July 1760	26 November 1764	Returned to England	East India; Company
17	John Spencer		3 December 1764	3 May 1765		East India; Company
18	Robert Clive, 1st Baron Clive		3 May 1765	20 January 1767	Returned to England	East India; Company
19	Harry Verelst		29 January 1767	24 December 1769	Retired from the service	East India; Company
20	John Cartier		26 December 1769	13 April 1772		East India; Company
21	Warren Hastings		13 April 1772	20 October 1773 (office superseded)	Appointed as the Governor-General of Fort William in Bengal in 1773	East India; Company

== List ==
Portrait	Name	Term		Appointer
Before 1773 the Governor-General of the Presidency of Fort William was named as Governor of Bengal (1757–1772).
Governors General of the Presidency of Fort William (1773–1833)
	Warren Hastings (Note: Originally joined on 28 April 1772)	20 October 1773	8 February 1785	East India Company (1773–1858)
	John Macpherson (acting)	8 February 1785	12 September 1786	East India Company (1773–1858)
	Charles Cornwallis, 1st Marquess Cornwallis (Note: Earl Cornwallis from 1762; created Marquess Cornwallis in 1792.)	12 September 1786	28 October 1793	East India Company (1773–1858)
	John Shore	28 October 1793	18 March 1798	East India Company (1773–1858)
	Alured Clarke (acting)	18 March 1798	18 May 1798	East India Company (1773–1858)
	Richard Wellesley, 2nd Earl of Mornington (Note: Created Marquess Wellesley in 1799.)	18 May 1798	30 July 1805	East India Company (1773–1858)
	Charles Cornwallis, 1st Marquess Cornwallis	30 July 1805	5 October 1805	East India Company (1773–1858)
	Sir George Barlow, 1st Baronet (acting)	10 October 1805	31 July 1807	East India Company (1773–1858)
	Gilbert Elliot-Murray-Kynynmound, 1st Baron Minto	31 July 1807	4 October 1813	East India Company (1773–1858)
	Francis Rawdon-Hastings, 1st Marquess of Hastings (Note: Earl of Moira prior to being created Marquess of Hastings in 1816)	4 October 1813	9 January 1823	East India Company (1773–1858)
	John Adam (acting)	9 January 1823	1 August 1823	East India Company (1773–1858)
	William Amherst, 2nd Baron Amherst (Note: Created Earl Amherst in 1826.)	1 August 1823	13 March 1828	East India Company (1773–1858)
	William Butterworth Bayley (acting)	13 March 1828	4 July 1828	East India Company (1773–1858)
Governors-General of India (1834–1858)
	Lord William Bentinck	4 July 1828	20 March 1835	East India Company (1773–1858)
	Sir Charles Metcalfe, 3rd Baronet (acting)	20 March 1835	4 March 1836	East India Company (1773–1858)
	George Eden, 2nd Baron Auckland (Note: Created Earl of Auckland in 1839.)	4 March 1836	28 February 1842	East India Company (1773–1858)
	Edward Law, 2nd Baron Ellenborough	28 February 1842	June; 1844	East India Company (1773–1858)
	William Wilberforce Bird (acting)	June; 1844	23 July 1844	East India Company (1773–1858)
	Henry Hardinge (Note: Created Viscount Hardinge in 1846.)	23 July 1844	12 January 1848	East India Company (1773–1858)
	James Broun-Ramsay, 10th Earl of Dalhousie (Note: Created Marquess of Dalhousie in 1849.)	12 January 1848	28 February 1856	East India Company (1773–1858)
	Charles Canning, 2nd Viscount Canning (Note: Created Earl Canning in 1859.)	28 February 1856	31 October 1858	East India Company (1773–1858)
Viceroys and Governors-General of India (1858–1947)
	Charles Canning, 2nd Viscount Canning (Note: Created Earl Canning in 1859.)	1 November 1858	21 March 1862	Victoria (1837–1901)
	James Bruce, 8th Earl of Elgin	21 March 1862	20 November 1863	Victoria (1837–1901)
	Robert Napier (acting)	21 November 1863	2 December 1863	Victoria (1837–1901)
	William Denison (acting)	2 December 1863	12 January 1864	Victoria (1837–1901)
	Sir John Lawrence, 1st Baronet	12 January 1864	12 January 1869	Victoria (1837–1901)
	Richard Bourke, 6th Earl of Mayo	12 January 1869	8 February 1872	Victoria (1837–1901)
	Sir John Strachey (acting)	9 February 1872	23 February 1872	Victoria (1837–1901)
	Francis Napier, 10th Lord Napier (acting)	24 February 1872	3 May 1872	Victoria (1837–1901)
	Thomas Baring, 2nd Baron Northbrook	3 May 1872	12 April 1876	Victoria (1837–1901)
	Robert Bulwer-ytton, 2nd Baron Lytton	12 April 1876	8 June 1880	Victoria (1837–1901)
	George Robinson, 1st Marquess of Ripon	8 June 1880	13 December 1884	Victoria (1837–1901)
	Frederick Hamilton-Temple-Blackwood, 1st Earl of Dufferin	13 December 1884	10 December 1888	Victoria (1837–1901)
	Henry Petty-Fitzmaurice, 5th Marquess of Lansdowne	10 December 1888	11 October 1894	Victoria (1837–1901)
	Victor Bruce, 9th Earl of Elgin	11 October 1894	6 January 1899	Victoria (1837–1901)
	The Lord Curzon of Kedleston (Note: Oliver Russell, 2nd Baron Ampthill was acting Governor-General in 1904)	6 January 1899	18 November 1905	Victoria (1837–1901)
	Gilbert Elliot-Murray-Kynynmound, 4th Earl of Minto	18 November 1905	23 November 1910	Edward VII (1901–1910)
	Charles Hardinge, 1st Baron Hardinge of Penshurst	23 November 1910	4 April 1916	George V (1910–1936)
	Frederic Thesiger, 3rd Baron Chelmsford	4 April 1916	2 April 1921	George V (1910–1936)
	Rufus Isaacs, 1st Earl of Reading	2 April 1921	3 April 1926	George V (1910–1936)
	E. F. L. Wood, 1st Baron Irwin	3 April 1926	18 April 1931	George V (1910–1936)
	Freeman Freeman-Thomas, 1st Earl of Willingdon	18 April 1931	18 April 1936	George V (1910–1936)
	Victor Hope, 2nd Marquess of Linlithgow	18 April 1936	1 October 1943	Edward VIII (1936)
	Archibald Wavell, 1st Viscount Wavell	1 October 1943	21 February 1947	George VI (1936–1947) (As Emperor of India)
	Louis Mountbatten, 1st Viscount Mountbatten of Burma	21 February 1947	15 August 1947	George VI (1936–1947) (As Emperor of India)
Governors-General of the Dominion of India (1947–1950)
	The Viscount Mountbatten of Burma (Note: Created Earl Mountbatten of Burma on 28 October 1947.)	15 August 1947	21 June 1948	George VI (1947–1950) (As King of India)
	Chakravarti Rajagopalachari	21 June 1948	26 January 1950	George VI (1947–1950) (As King of India)

== Governors of the Presidency of Fort William in Bengal (1834-1854) ==
By an Act of 1833 (3 & 4 William IV., cap. lxxxv., Section lvi.), it was enacted " that the Executive Government of each of the several Presidencies of Fort William in Bengal, Fort St. George, Bombay, and Agra shall be administered by a Governor and three Councilors, to be styled the Governor-in-Council of the said Presidencies of Fort William in Bengal, Fort St. George, Bombay, and Agra respectively, and that the Governor General of India for the time being shall be Governor of the Presidency of Fort William in Bengal. From this time the Governors General of India held also the separate office of Governor of Bengal, until the year 1854. Under the Charter Act 1853 the Governor General of India was relieved of his concurrent duties as Governor of Bengal and empowered to appoint a lieutenant-governor from 1854.

Governors of the Presidency of Fort William in Bengal (ex-officio Governor-General of India, 1833–1857)
#	Name (birth–death)	Portrait	Took office	Left office	Appointee
1	Lord William Bentick (1774–1839)		15 November 1834 (1833)	20 March 1835	East India; Company
-	Sir Charles Metcalfe, 3rd Baronet, ICS (acting) (1785–1846)		20 March 1835	4 March 1836	East India; Company
2	George Eden, 2nd Baron Auckland (1784–1849)		4 March 1836	28 February 1842	East India; Company
3	Edward Law, 2nd Baron Ellenborough (1790–1871)		28 February 1842	June 1844	East India; Company
-	William Wilberforce Bird, ICS (acting) (1784–1857)		June 1844	23 July 1844	East India; Company
4	Sir Henry Hardinge (1785–1856)		23 July 1844	12 January 1848	East India; Company
5	James Broun-Ramsay, 10th Earl of Dalhousie (1812–1860)		12 January 1848	1 May 1854 (28 February 1856)	East India; Company

== Lieutenant governors of the Bengal Presidency (1854-1912) ==
=== Lieutenant governors of the Presidency of Fort William in Bengal (1854-1912) ===
Under the Charter Act 1853 the Governor General of India was relieved of his concurrent duties as Governor of Bengal and a separate Governor of Bengal shall be appointed. Until then a Lieutenant Governor will be appointed. F. J. Halliday became the first lieutenant governor of the Bengal Presidency. William Duke served as the last lieutenant governor after which the office was superseded by the Governor of Bengal province in 1912.

Lieutenant governors of the Presidency of Fort William in Bengal
#	Name	Portrait	Took office	Left office	Governor-General
1	Frederick James Halliday		1854	1859	James Broun-Ramsay, 1st Marquess of Dalhousie
2	John Peter Grant		1859	1862	Charles Canning, 1st Earl Canning
3	Cecil Beadon		1862	1866	Charles Canning, 1st Earl Canning
4	William Grey		1867	1870	Sir John Lawrence, 1st Baronet
5	George Campbell		1870	1874	Richard Bourke, 6th Earl of Mayo
6	Sir Richard Temple Hart		1874	1877	Thomas Baring, 2nd Baron Northbrook
7	Sir Ashley Eden		1877	1882	Thomas Baring, 2nd Baron Northbrook
8	Sir Augustus Thompson		1882	1887	George Robinson, 1st Marquess of Ripon
9	Sir Steuart Bayley		1887	1890	Frederick Hamilton-Temple-Blackwood, 1st Earl of Dufferin
10	Sir Charles Alfred Elliott		1890	1893	Henry Petty-Fitzmaurice, 5th Marquess of Lansdowne
11	Sir Anthony MacDonnell		1893	1895	Henry Petty-Fitzmaurice, 5th Marquess of Lansdowne
12	Sir Alexander Mackenzie		1895	1897	Victor Bruce, 9th Earl of Elgin
13	Sir Charles Stevens		1897	1898	Victor Bruce, 9th Earl of Elgin
14	Sir John Woodburn		1898	1902	Victor Bruce, 9th Earl of Elgin
15	James Bourdillon		1902	1903	George Curzon, 1st Baron Curzon of Kedleston
16	Sir Andrew Henderson Leith Fraser		1903	1906	George Curzon, 1st Baron Curzon of Kedleston
17	Francis Slacke		1906	1908	Gilbert Elliot-Murray-Kynynmound, 4th Earl of Minto
18	Sir Edward Norman Baker		1908	1911	Gilbert Elliot-Murray-Kynynmound, 4th Earl of Minto
19	Frederick William Duke		1911	1912	Charles Hardinge, 1st Baron Hardinge of Penshurst

=== Lieutenant governors of the Province of Eastern Bengal and Assam (1905-1912) ===
Lord Curzon, the Viceroy of India, proposed the Partition of Bengal on religious lines into Hindu-majority Bengal and Muslim-majority Eastern Bengal and Assam and put it into effect on 16 October 1905. Dacca became the capital. The partition stoked controversy among Indian nationalists, who described it as an attempt to "divide and rule" the Bengali homeland. Sir Bampfylde Fuller was the province's first Lieutenant Governor. However, at the Delhi Durbar in 1911, King George V announced that the British government had decided to annul the partition. Eastern Bengal was reunited with western Bengali districts, and Assam was made a Chief-Commissionership.

Lieutenant governors of the Province of Eastern Bengal and Assam
#	Name	Portrait	Took office	Left office	Governor-General
1	Sir Bampfylde Fuller		16 October 1905	20 August 1906	George Curzon, 1st Baron Curzon of Kedleston
2	Lancelot Hare		20 August 1906	1911	Gilbert Elliot-Murray-Kynynmound, 4th Earl of Minto
3	Sir Charles Stuart Bayley		1911	21 March 1912	Charles Hardinge, 1st Baron Hardinge of Penshurst

== Governors of Bengal (1912–1947) ==
On 12 December 1911 at the Delhi Durbar, King George V announced the transfer of the seat of the Government of India from Calcutta to Delhi and the reunification of the five predominantly Bengali-speaking divisions into a Presidency (or province) of Bengal under a Governor. On 1 April 1912 Thomas Gibson-Carmichael was appointed the Governor of Bengal. Sir Frederick Burrows became the last Governor of the Bengal province following the Independence of India.

Governors of Bengal
Name	Portrait	Took office	Left office	Appointer
Thomas Gibson-Carmichael, 1st Baron Carmichael		1 April 1912	26 March 1917	Charles Hardinge, 1st Baron Hardinge of Penshurst
Lawrence Dundas, Earl of Ronaldshay		26 March 1917	28 March 1922	Frederic Thesiger, 3rd Baron Chelmsford
Victor Bulwer-Lytton, 2nd Earl of Lytton		28 March 1922	28 March 1927	Rufus Isaacs, 1st Earl of Reading
Sir Francis Stanley Jackson		28 March 1927	28 March 1932	E. F. L. Wood, 1st Baron Irwin
Sir John Anderson		29 March 1932	30 May 1937	Freeman Freeman-Thomas, 1st Earl of Willingdon
Michael Knatchbull, 5th Baron Brabourne		30 May 1937	23 February 1939	Victor Hope, 2nd Marquess of Linlithgow
Sir John Arthur Herbert		1 July 1939	1 December 1943	Victor Hope, 2nd Marquess of Linlithgow
Richard Casey, Baron Casey		14 January 1944	19 February 1946	Archibald Wavell, 1st Viscount Wavell
Sir Frederick Burrows		19 February 1946	15 August 1947	Archibald Wavell, 1st Viscount Wavell

== See also ==
- List of governors of Bombay Presidency
- List of colonial governors and presidents of Madras Presidency
- List of governors of West Bengal
- List of presidents of Bangladesh
