= John Goldsborough =

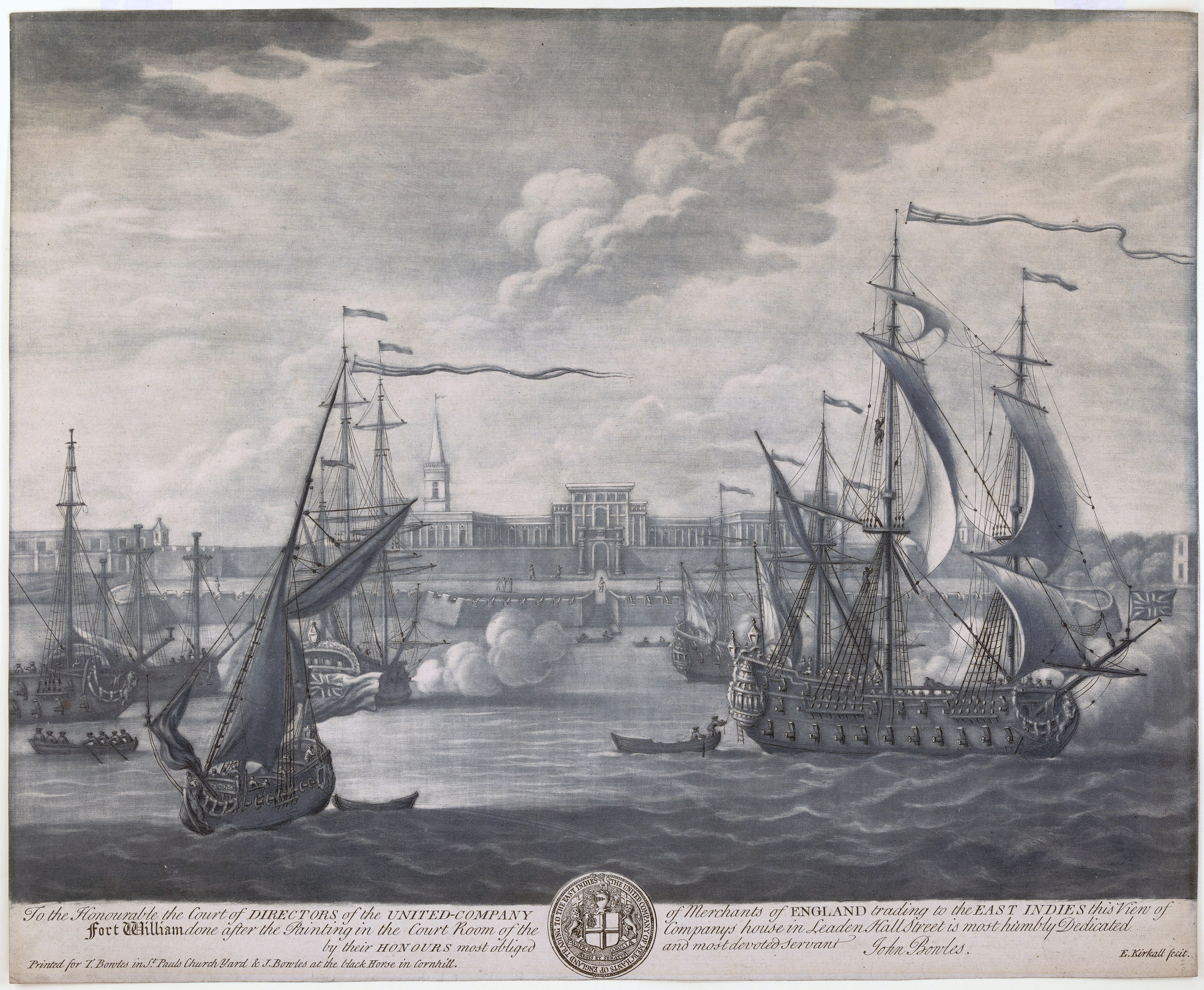
Fort William, Calcutta, 1735

Sir John Goldsborough (died November 1693) was a sea-captain and administrator of the British East India Company. He was the founder of Fort William in Calcutta, India.

== Biography ==
=== Early life ===
He was a native of Suffolk, in which county he possessed an estate. He was in command of the East Indiaman Antelope when that ship was taken by a Dutch fleet, between Masulipatam and Madras on 22 August 1673. His account of the engagement is in the Bodleian Library. He later commanded the Falcon in 1673–4, and Bengal Merchant in 1676–7, 1683, and 1686.

=== India ===
The death of Sir John Child in February 1690 created a vacuum in power within the company's hierarchy in India, and no officer initially succeeded Child. In January 1691, the Company directors resolved to appoint Gainsborough to act as the first member of council at the different settlements in India. In February, he was knighted, and given the official title of ‘supervisor-commissary-general and chief governor' and set sail for India in March. The following year he was made ‘captain-general and commander-in-chief’ based at Madras. He arrived at Fort St. George on 5 December 1692. His first instructions from the directors were to proceed with the construction of a steeple at a church at Fort George and to enlarge the town into a quadrangle. He thereafter began investigating the quarrel between the late governor, Elihu Yale, and his council. In June 1693 he went to Fort St. David, and after a short stay there returned by land to Madras in July.

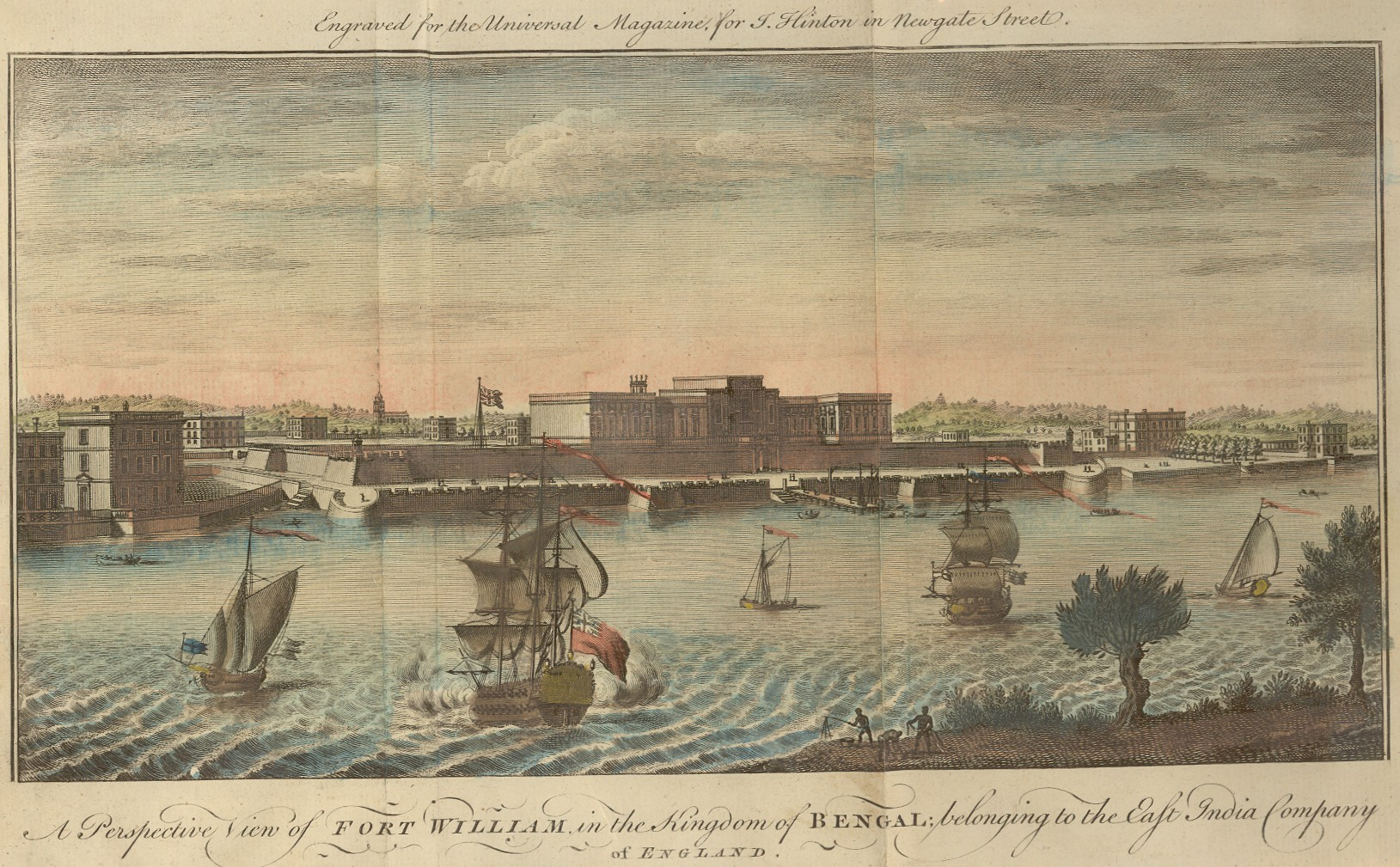
"A Perspective View of Fort William" by Jan Van Ryne, 1754

On 29 July he embarked for the Bay of Bengal, arriving at Chatanati, just north of Calcutta on 12 August. He reported unfavourably of the late Job Charnock and the disorder that followed amongst the company's servants. He criticised Charnock's successor Francis Ellis as worsening the situation, and noting that he was "a man too easy and weak to stand alone in the head of such an affairs as this" and that "he led too loose a life to give any good example or govern this place". Ellis was quickly remanded to Fort St. George, and Charles Eyre made his replacement.

During his stay in Bengal, he criticised how everyone built as they pleased, without regulation, and noted how the company would incur large costs rectifying factories poorly constructed on unsuitable land. To resolve the situation he ordered a suitable piece of land to be enclosed by mud walls, and upon the approval of the local government, a factory was to be built on the land. The factory was to become the Fort William. He also ordered Eyre to relocate the administrators into the only brick building, along with the papers in their possessions, which were at the time housed in thatched huts and liable to the hazard of fire.

=== Death ===
While staying at Chatanati, Goldsborough was struck down by fever and died ‘within some few days after’ 28 November 1693. Before leaving London he made a will, dated 7 March 1691, wherein he described himself as ‘of Bethnall Green, in the county of Middlesex, knight, being bound on a voyage to the East India beyond the seas in the shipp Berkly Castle’ (registered in P. C. C. 12, Bond). Goldsborough was succeeded by Sir John Gayer, who was appointed General of India and based at Bombay.

== Personal life ==
Following his death, his wife and children remained at Charles Street, Fort George. His widow Mary later married Roger Braddyll, a member of Governor Pitt's council at Fort St. George. She died in India some time previously to 4 November 1702, on which day her husband administered to her estate at London.
