= Feake =

Feake is a surname. Notable people with the surname include:

- Charles Feake (c. 1716–1762), English physician
- Christopher Feake (1612–1683), English Congregationalist clergyman
- Robert Feake (1602–c. 1661), New England settler
