= Samuel Feake =

Administrator in British India (died 1757)

- Died: 16 June 1757; London
- Occupation: Colonial Administrator
- Known for: President of Bengal

Samuel Feake (died 16 Jun 1757) was an administrator of the English East India Company. He served as President in the Bay and as Governor and Commander-in-Chief for Fort William. His son, Charles Feake, was an English physician and Fellow of the Royal Society. Feake was appointed Governor of Bengal for the United East India Company on 12 January 1718, succeeding Robert Hedges. He left office on 17 January 1723 and later returned to England due to illness.

== Death ==
Feake died on 16 June 1757 in London at the age of 75.

Political offices
Preceded by Robert Hedges	President of Bengal; 12 January 1718 – 17 January 1723	Succeeded by John Deane
