= Frederick Halliday =

Frederick or Fred Halliday is the name of:

- Fred Halliday (1946–2010), British academic writer, particularly on the Middle East
- Fred Halliday (footballer) (1880–1953), English footballer and manager
- Sir Frederick James Halliday (1806–1901), First Lieutenant-Governor of Bengal
- Sir Frederick Loch Halliday, Police Commissioner of Kolkata and later first Commissioner of the Greek Cities Police
