= Francis Slacke =

English civil servant in India

Francis Slacke CSI (6 June 1853 – 8 August 1940) was a senior officer in the Indian Civil Service and later became Lieutenant-Governor of Bengal.

== Early life ==
Francis Alexander Slack (post Slacke) was born in the parish of Saint Saviour in Jersey and educated at Blundell's School in Tiverton, University College, Oxford and St John's College, Cambridge. On 19 November 1879 Slacke married Caroline Elizabeth Cave, 2nd daughter of Thomas Cave, M.P. and sister of Viscount Cave.

== Career ==
Slacke entered the Indian Civil Service in 1874 and was admitted at the Inner Temple on 27 May 1875. His appointments included:

- Magistrate and Collector - 1892
- Secretary to the Board of Revenue – 1896
- Secretary to the Government of Bengal (Revenue and General Department) – 1900
- Commissioner – 1903
- Major, Calcutta Light Horse (1905-8)
- Member of Board of Revenue – 1906
- Lieutenant-Governor of Bengal - 1906
- Vice-president of Bengal Legislative Council - 1910
- Vice-president of Bengal Executive Council - 1911

Slacke retired from the Indian Civil Service in 1912 and was subsequently appointed Fellow of Calcutta University (1907) and President of Fisheries Advisory Committee (1908).
