= Cecil Beadon =

English administrator

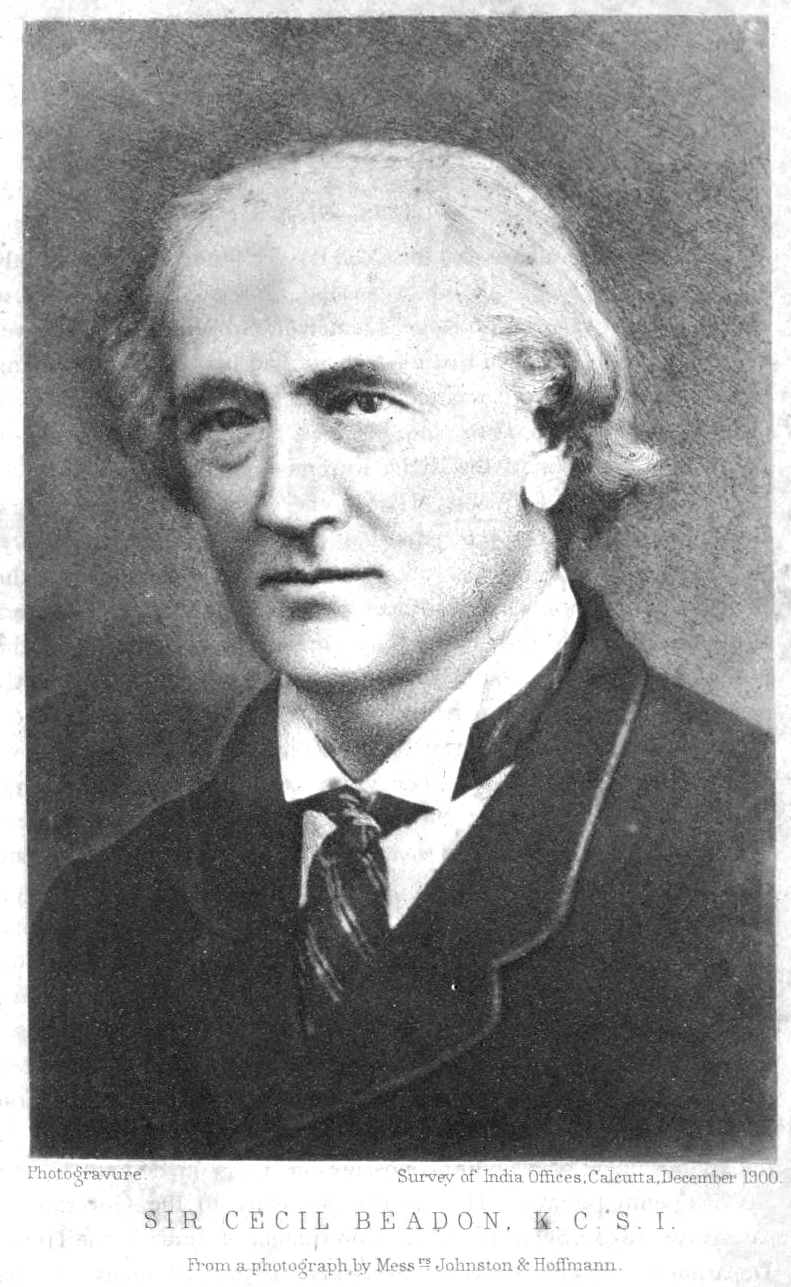

Lieutenant Governor of the Bengal Presidency
- In office 1862–1866
- Appointed by: Charles Canning, 1st Earl Canning
- Preceded by: John Peter Grant
- Succeeded by: William Grey

Personal details
- Born: 1816
- Died: 18 July 1880 (aged 63–64)

Sir Cecil Beadon, KCSI (1816 – 18 July 1880) was an English administrator in British India, serving as lieutenant-governor of the Bengal Presidency from 1862 to 1866, when he was relieved of the post after a commission of inquiry, which was critical of his handling of the Orissa famine of 1866.

== Life ==
He was the youngest son of Richard Beadon (1779–1858), and grandson of Richard Beadon, the bishop of Bath and Wells His mother, Annabella Ashe née à Court (1781–1866) was the daughter of Sir William à Court 1st Baronet à Court of Heytesbury; and sister of William à Court, 1st Baron Heytesbury. Cecil was educated at Eton College and Shrewsbury School.

At the age of eighteen he was presented with an appointment to the Bengal civil service, which had been placed by the court of directors at the disposal of his uncle Lord Heytesbury, nominated as Governor-General of India in 1835 (by Robert Peel, but the nomination was cancelled by the fall of Peel's administration). Reaching India in 1836, Beadon spent time in district offices administration, and was serving as magistrate of Murshidabad when in 1843 he was appointed under-secretary to the government of Bengal.

From that time his promotion was rapid. After filling posts in the revenue administration, he was selected in 1850 by James Broun-Ramsay, 1st Marquess of Dalhousie to represent the Bengal presidency on a commission on the postal system. He then held in succession the posts of secretary to the government of Bengal, secretary to the government of India in the home department, foreign secretary, member of the council of the governor-general (1860–2), and finally that of lieutenant-governor of Bengal (1862–6). He was backed by three Governors-General, Hardinge, Dalhousie who consulted him on internal administration, and Canning. During most of the Indian Rebellion of 1857, Beadon was home secretary.

In Bengal, measures Beadon implemented in the Assam tea trade were held to have caused a slump, and the mission of Ashley Eden to Bhutan went badly, and was followed by the Bhutan war. The Orissa famine of 1866 found him absent from Calcutta for health reasons. The Governor-General, Sir John Lawrence did not overrule Beadon's view of the famine. The report of a commission of inquiry on the handling of the famine was unfavourable to Beadon, who left India and returned to England.

He died on 18 July 1880 in his sixty-fifth year.

== Orissa famine ==
During the Orissa famine of 1866, he did nothing to alleviate deaths from famine, as he was concerned about tampering with the natural laws of economics. He remarked that "Such visitations of providence as these no government can do much either to prevent or alleviate," and that if he attempted to alleviate deaths from famine, he would consider himself "no better than a dacoit or thief." He maintained this viewpoint in spite of the fact that India exported over 200 million pounds of rice to Britain during the period of famine.

== Family ==
In 1837 he married firstly Harriet Sneyd (1818–1855) daughter of Major Ralph Henry Sneyd (1784–1840) of the Bengal cavalry, with whom he had ten children; and in 1860 he married secondly Agnes Stendale (1836–1906), daughter of William Handley Sterndale (1791–1866) and sister of Robert Armitage Sterndale, with whom he had ten more.

Children by Harriet Sneyd:

- Col Cecil Beadon (1838–1913); who married Elinor Augusta Flora Plowden (1846–1886), a sister of Sir Henry Meredyth Plowden
- Col Richard Beadon (1839–1884); who married Elinor Louisa Cooper Sterndale (1846–1907) a younger sister of his step-mother Agnes
- Henry Sneyd Beadon (1842–1890); who married Elizabeth Ellen Boddam (1849–1928), a great-granddaughter of Rawson Hart Boddam
- Edward Sneyd Beadon (1846–1933); who married Edith Rachel Edwards (1851–1883)
- William à Court Beadon (1847–1917); who married Emily Florence Dixon (1863–?)
- Rev Hyde Elphinstone Beadon (1851–1855)
- Harold Archibald Beadon (1853–1921)
- three children who died young born in 1842, 1844 and 1850

Children by Agnes Stendale:

- Helen Beadon (1861–1933); married Sir Henry Meredyth Plowden (1840–1920)
- Philip Canning Beadon (1863–1864), born and died an infant in India
- Lt Col Guy Cecil Beadon (1864–1915); married Olive Coates (1870–?)
- Isabel Margaret Beadon (1867–1930); married in 1903 Colonel William Graham Waugh McClintock (1846–1924)
- Lt Col Arthur Eyre Beadon (1869–1945); married Marjory Armytage Blunt (1878–1962)
- Agnes Imogen Beadon (1870–1964); married Judge Sir Arthur Hay Stewart Reid (1851–1930), Hilda Stewart Reid (1898–1982) was their daughter.
- Eirene Beadon (1872–1897); married George William Dyson (1864–1922)
- Capt Lancelot Richmond Beadon (1876–1922); married Hilda Marian née Raper (1880–1953)
- Violet Beadon (1879–1949); married Archibald Campbell MA (1877–1963), Judge of the High Court of Lahore

== See also ==
- List of governors of Bengal Presidency

Government offices
| Preceded by Sir John Peter Grant | Lieutenant-governor of Bengal; 1862–1866 | Succeeded by Sir William Grey |
