= John Peter Grant =

British colonial administrator (1807–1893)

Sir John Peter Grant GCMG KCB
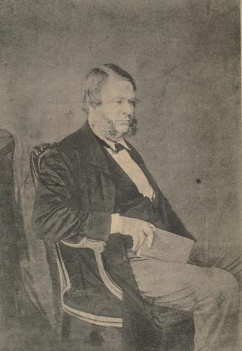
- Born: 28 November 1807; London
- Died: 6 January 1893 (aged 85)
- Education: Eton College; Edinburgh University; East India College; Fort William College
- Occupation: colonial administrator
- Spouse: Henrietta Isabella Phillippa Plowden

Sir John Peter Grant, GCMG, KCB, (28 November 1807 – 6 January 1893), was a British colonial administrator who served as Lieutenant-Governor of Bengal (1859–1862) and as Governor of Jamaica.

== Life ==
John Peter Grant was born in London on 28 November 1807. His parents were the similarly named John Peter Grant, who came from Rothiemurchus, Inverness-shire, and his wife, Jane, a daughter of William Ironside from Houghton-le-Spring, County Durham.

Grant was educated at Eton College from 1819, spent some time at Edinburgh University and then, in 1827, became a student at the East India College in Haileybury. He joined the Bengal Civil Service in the following year and spent some time at Fort William College in Calcutta before being appointed as an assistant magistrate in Bareilly. The experience there did not suit him and he returned to Calcutta in 1832.

There followed a nine-year period during which Grant held various secretarial posts in the administration.

== Jamaica ==
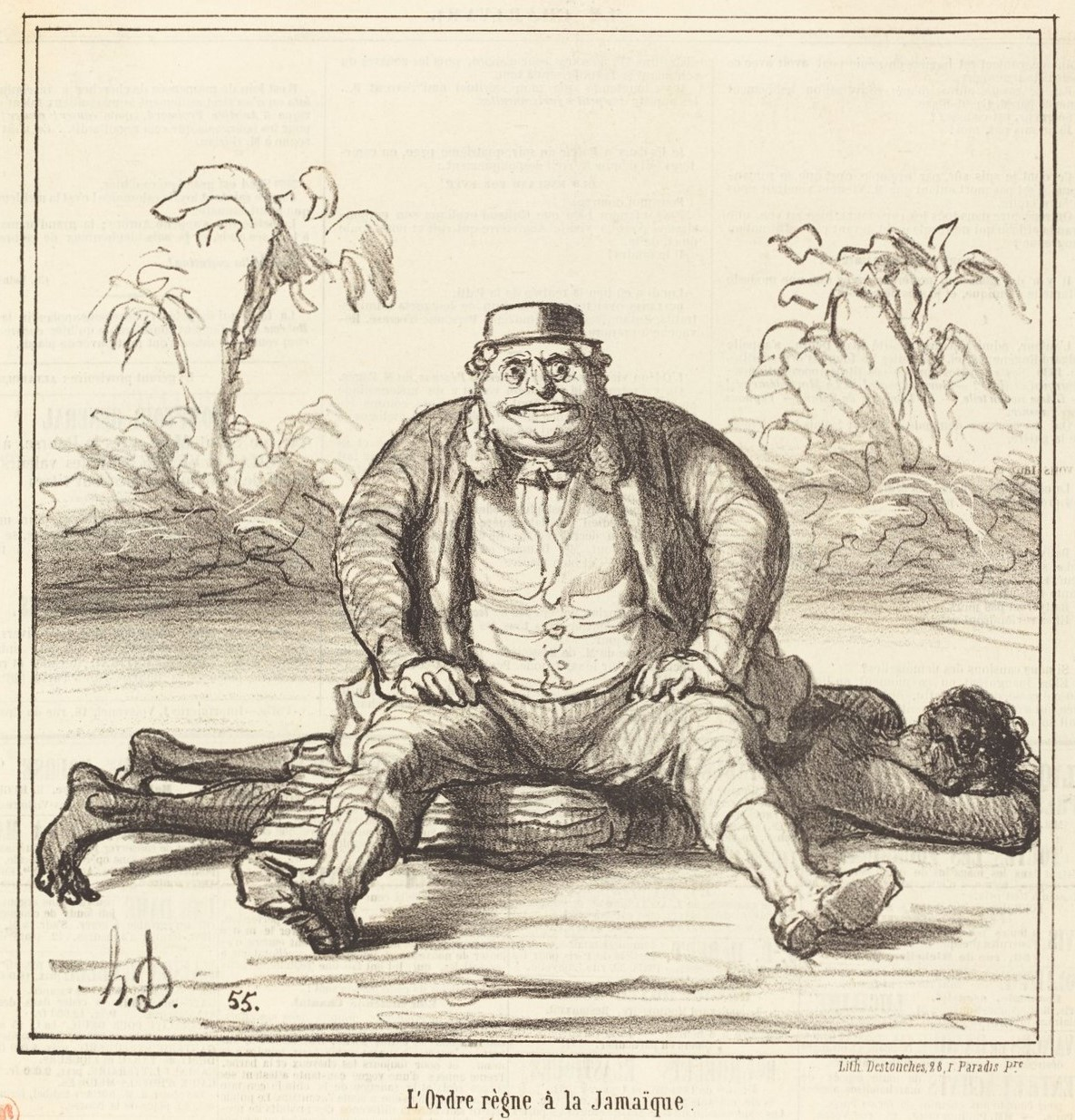
1866 lithography by French cartoonist Honoré Daumier showing British Governor John Peter Grant establishing his authority following the Morant Bay Rebellion

Grant was appointed Governor of Jamaica and arrived on 5 August 1866. His arrival attracted excited crowds and he was given a guard of honour from the First and Third West India Regiments. Grant was responsible for the disestablishment of the Anglican Church in Jamaica, which took place in 1870, and he also established a constabulary in 1867 as well as instituting Crown Colony rule with a nominated council there.

He died at Upper Norwood on 6 January 1893.

== Family ==
On 16 February 1835, Grant married Henrietta Isabella Phillippa Plowden at Calcutta Cathedral. She was the daughter of another Bengal Civil Service officer, Trevor Chichele Plowden. The couple had five sons and three daughters, one of whom, Jane Maria Strachey was a leading suffragist and she married Sir Richard Strachey.

His son Major Bartle Grant was the father of the painter Duncan Grant.

== See also ==
- John Peter Grant, 13th Earl of Dysart
- List of governors of Bengal Presidency

Government offices
Preceded by Sir Frederick James Halliday	Lieutenant-governor of Bengal; 1859–1862	Succeeded by Sir Cecil Beadon
Preceded by Henry Knight Storks	Governor of Jamaica; 1866–1874	Succeeded by W. A. G. Young (acting)
