= Charles Feake =

English physician

Charles Feake (c.1716–1762) was an English physician and Fellow of the Royal Society.

== Life ==
He was the son of Samuel Feake (died 1757) of Durrington Hall in Essex from 1720. He was born in Cossimbazar, West Bengal, where his father was governor of Fort William (1718 to 1723). He was educated at Stoke Newington (Mr Stuckey), at Newcome's School for three years, and Caius College, Cambridge where he matriculated in 1732, later graduating later M.B. in 1738 and M.D. in 1743.

Feake was physician to Guy's Hospital, from 1745, when for the first time the hospital took on a third physician. He became a Fellow of the Royal College of Physicians in 1745 and a Fellow of the Royal Society in 1748; and gave the Harveian Oration in 1749.

Feake died on 2 August 1762. His library was sold in 1763.
