= John Stackhouse (colonial administrator) =

- Born: c. 1680
- Died: 1741
- Occupation: Colonial Administrator
- Known for: President of Bengal

John Stackhouse was an administrator of the English East India Company. He served as the company's governor of the Bengal Presidency in the eighteenth century.

Political offices
Preceded by John Deane	Governor of Bengal Presidency; 25 February 1732 – 29 January 1739	Succeeded by Thomas Broddyll
