= Robert Hedges (colonial administrator) =

British administrator

- Occupation: Colonial Administrator
- Known for: President of Bengal

Robert Hedges was an administrator of the English East India Company. He served as President of Bengal in the early eighteenth century.

Political offices
Preceded by John Russell	President of Bengal; 3 December 1713 – 12 January 1718	Succeeded by Samuel Flake
