= Thomas Broddyll =

British colonial administrator

- Occupation: Colonial Administrator
- Known for: President of Bengal

Thomas Broddyll was an administrator of the English East India Company. He served as President of Bengal in the eighteenth century.

Political offices
Preceded by John Stackhouse	President of Bengal; 29 January 1739 – 4 February 1746	Succeeded by John Forster
