= Charles Eyre (colonial administrator) =

British merchant and President of Bengal (died 1729)

Sir Charles Eyre
- Born: England
- Died: 1729; Calcutta
- Resting place: St. Anne Churchyard, Kew, England
- Occupation: Colonial Administrator
- Known for: President of Fort William
- Spouse: Mary Charnock

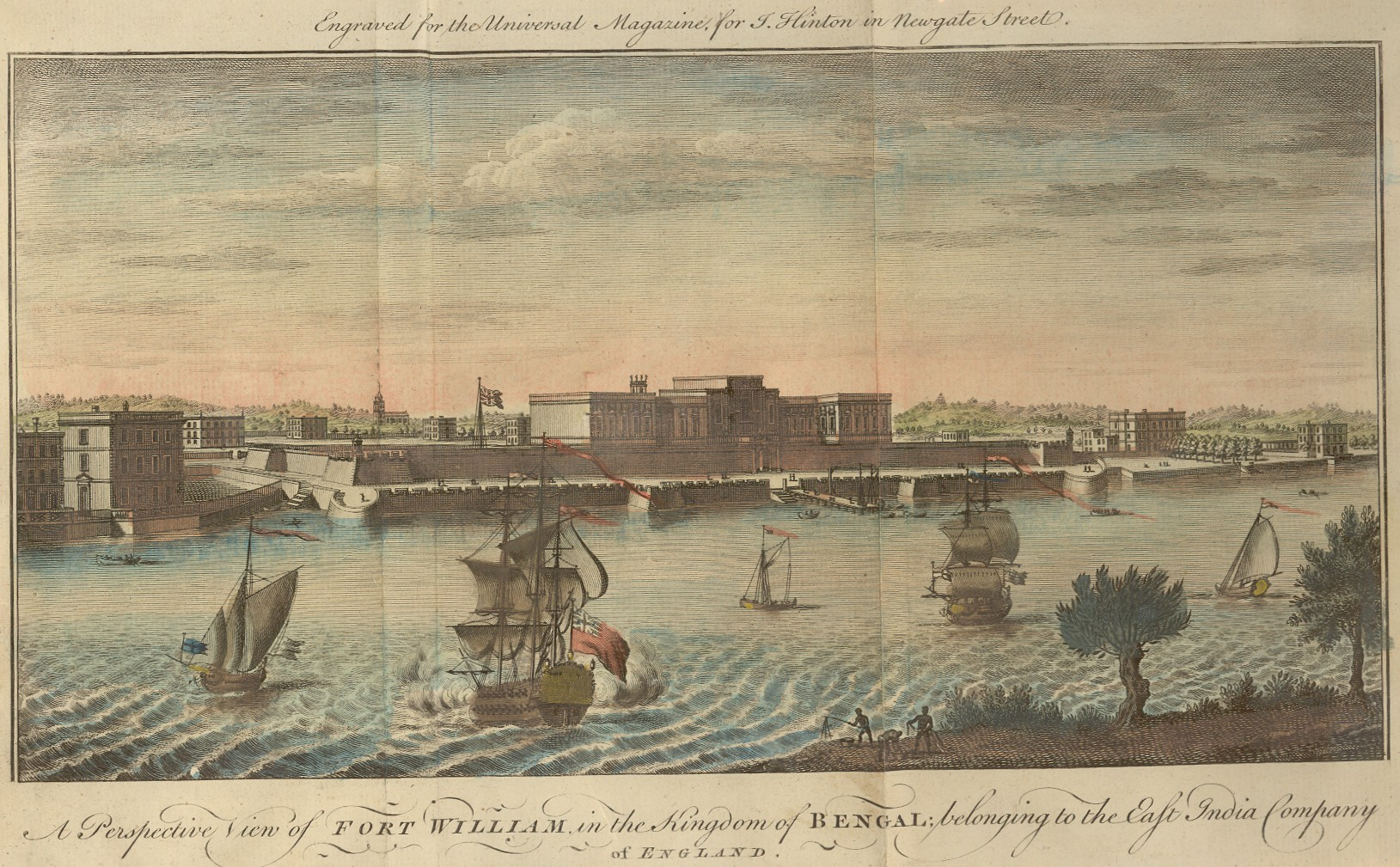
Fort William, c. 1760

Sir Charles Eyre (died 1729) was an administrator of the British East India Company and founder of Fort William, Calcutta. He was a President of Fort William.

== Career ==
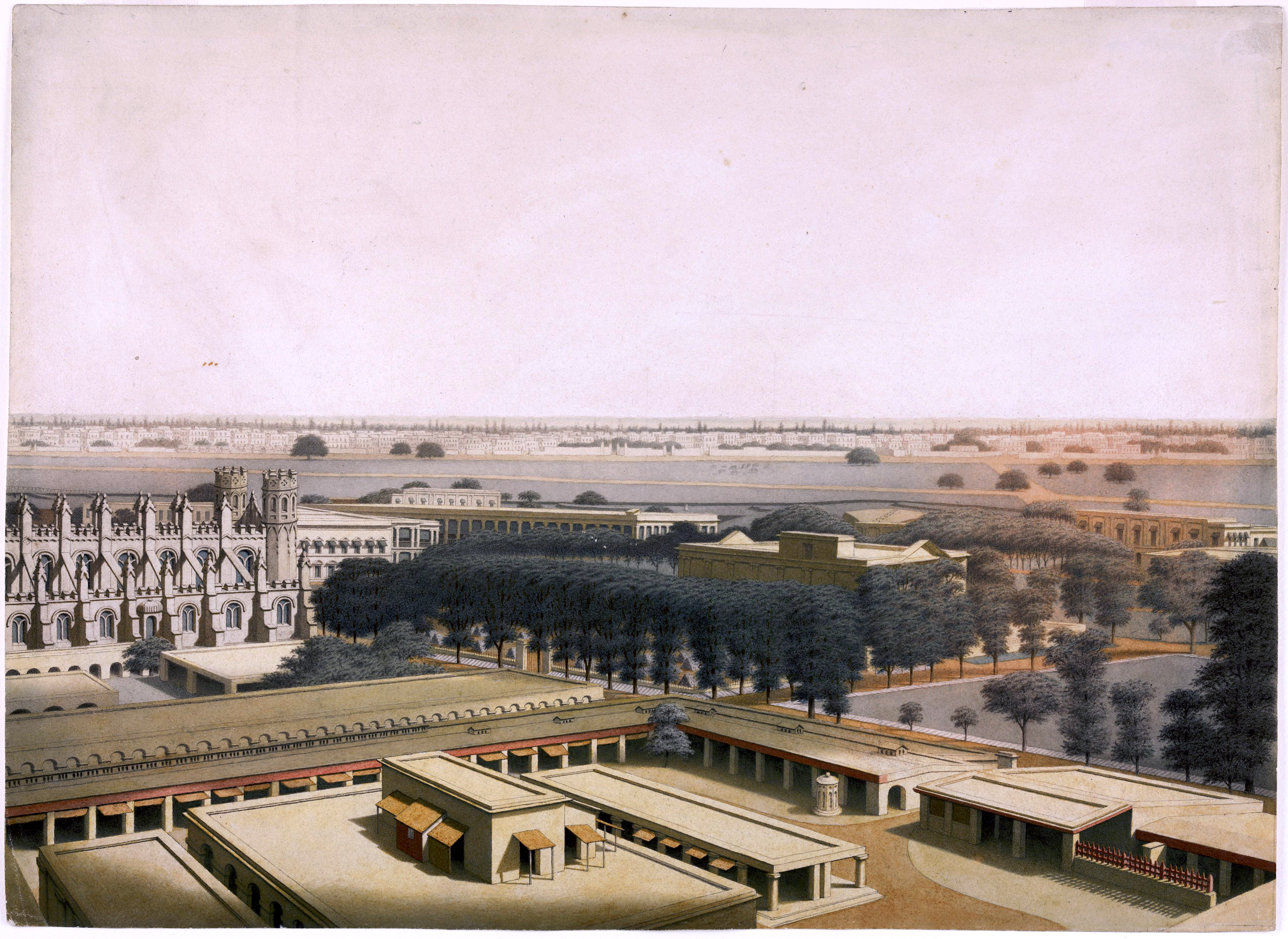
Fort William, Calcutta: a view from the inside, c. 1828

While in office, Eyre started work on Fort William, Calcutta in 1696. On 10 November 1698, Eyre signed the document legalizing the British occupation of three small villages that formed the basis of the Fort William settlement; his signature, and not that of his father-in-law Job Charnock (who died in 1692) appears on the document signed with the original landlords, the Sabarna Roy Choudhury family. In December 1699, Eyre was appointed president and governor of Fort William in Bengal, and Bengal was at the same time constituted a presidency. He was the first governor appointed by the Company to Bengal since William Hedges (agent and governor) in 1681 and William Gyfford (president and governor) in December 1683 (after which the title of governor had been temporarily dropped in favour of agent and chief of the bay of Bengal, Bengal having again been subordinated to Madras).

As a merchant, Eyre amassed a fortune of 23,000 Pagodas, which through the ingenuity of Thomas Pitt he converted into diamonds to take back with him to England in 1702, having first been ensured a sum of £13,800 through a bill of exchange. His will was proved on 23 October 1729.

== Personal life ==
Eyre was from Kew, Richmond, Surrey. Eyre was married to Mary, eldest daughter of Job Charnock. Eyre was a sometime resident of Kew, where he leased a house within the Kew Palace grounds from Sir Richard Levett, Lord Mayor of London who owned the palace as well as the house he leased to Eyre and the estate surrounding them. Levett was a powerful early London merchant who was a merchant adventurer in the Honourable East India Company and one of the first governors of the new Bank of England. He was a knight. Eyre was also one of the contributors to the founding of St Anne's Church in Kew in 1714.

== See also ==
- List of rulers of Bengal
- List of governors of Bengal Presidency
- History of Bengal
- History of Bangladesh
- History of India

Political offices
| Preceded by Francis Ellis | President of Bengal; 12 August 1693 – January 1694 | Succeeded by |
| Preceded by none | Chief Agent of Bengal; January 1694 – 1698 | Succeeded by John Beard |
| Preceded by John Beard | Chief Agent of Bengal; December 1699 – 26 May 1700 | Succeeded by |
| Preceded by | President of Bengal; 26 May 1700 – 7 January 1701 | Succeeded by John Beard |
