= Francis Ellis (colonial administrator) =

Administrator of the English East India Company

- Occupation: Colonial Administrator
- Known for: President of Bengal

Sir Francis Ellis was an administrator of the English East India Company, and President of Bengal in 1693.

Political offices
Preceded by Job Charnock	President of Bengal (acting); 10 January 1693 – 12 August 1693	Succeeded by Charles Eyre
