= John Forster (colonial administrator) =

British colonial administrator (died 1748)

- Died: 1748
- Occupation: Colonial Administrator
- Known for: President of Bengal

John Forster (died March 1748) was an administrator of the English East India Company. He served as governor of Fort William in Bengal in the eighteenth century. His daughter John Anna Forster [sic] (died 4 June 1774) married Sir Harry Goring, 6th Baronet.

Political offices
Preceded by Thomas Broddyll	President of Bengal; 4 February 1746 – 18 April 1748	Succeeded by William Barwell
