= Frederick James Halliday =

First Lieutenant Governor of Bengal

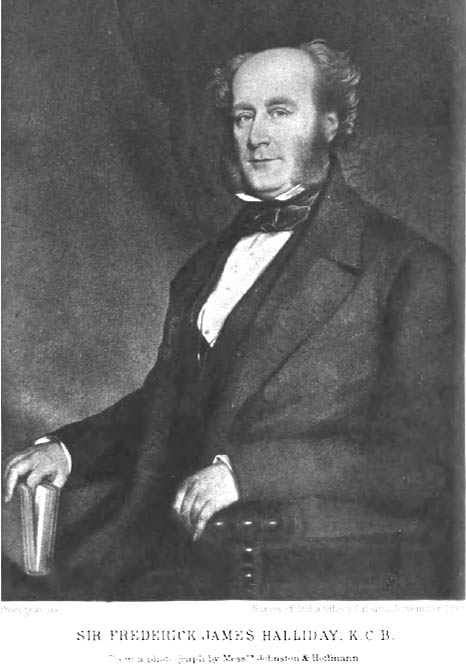
Sir Frederick James Halliday

Sir Frederick James Halliday KCB (25 December 1806 – 22 October 1901) was a British civil servant and the first Lieutenant-Governor of Bengal.

== Early life and career ==
Frederick James Halliday was born on 25 December 1806 at Ewell, Surrey. According to the Oxford Dictionary of National Biography, he was educated at Rugby School. However, a 1901 publication says that, although he went to Rugby in 1814, he entered St Paul's School, London in 1815, spent seven years there and thus "he may fairly be claimed as a Scholar of St. Paul's." This is also the opinion of a historian of St. Paul's, Michael McDonnell, who notes that Halliday was sent to Rugby to be under the influence of its head master, John Sleath, and moved to St. Paul's as a consequence of Sleath being appointed as High Master there. Subsequently, he attended the East India College in Haileybury, before joining the Bengal civil service in 1824. He attended Fort William College in Calcutta, where he was taught by I. C. Vidyasagar. His first office in the civil service was as an assistant working for the supreme court in 1825.

Halliday had become secretary to the Board of Revenue by 1836 and was appointed Home Secretary for the Government of India in 1849. He took a period of leave in England between July 1852 and November 1853, although he was frequently called upon to provide information to Parliament during that time.

== Lieutenant-governor ==
Around May 1854, Halliday was appointed as the first Lieutenant-Governor of Bengal. He took up residence at Belvedere House, the former home of Warren Hastings in Calcutta. Prior to that time the region had been overseen by the governor-general, and by a deputy-governor when the former was away. The deputies were appointed more on the basis of seniority than of merit. It had been recognised for some time that continued territorial acquisitions, which involved disparate populations and regions, both necessitated different administrative approaches and were causing the governor-general to be more frequently away from the area. The Marquess of Dalhousie, who was governor-general between 1847 and 1856, took the opportunity presented by the renewal of the East India Company's charter to reorganise affairs. It was anticipated that the appointment of Halliday would result in significant improvements to the administration of Bengal, and this proved to be the case because he had gained considerable administrative experience by this time.

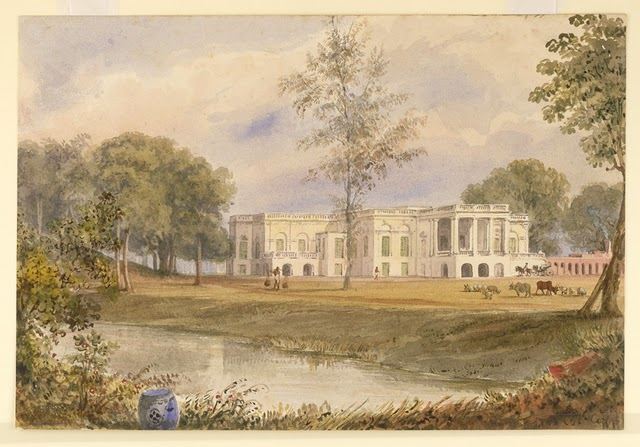
1838 illustration by William Prinsep of Belvedere House, Calcutta. This became Halliday's official residence as lieutenant-governor from 1854.

Among his achievements was the building of numerous roads that linked various towns. He also enabled much progress in the construction of the East Indian Railway. Both of these were seen by Halliday as necessities, for he recognised that speedy and accurate communication was a prerequisite for efficient administration. He introduced the Calcutta Municipal Act, enacted reforms of the police service (including better pay), tightened supervision of the inefficient justice system and increased the number of its officials. Arrangements were also introduced to limit civil disturbances and disruption by, for example, creating a force of military police. Although Bengal was on the periphery of events relating to the Indian rebellion of 1857, and Halliday was commended for his successes in dealing with civil unrest, he provided advice to Lord Canning, the governor-general, regarding how to deal with the rebellion elsewhere. He had past experience of uprisings, including one that had occurred at Santal in 1855, soon after his appointment to office.

Aside from his administrative reforms, Halliday was also active in pursuit of social change. While serving as a magistrate in Hooghly district in 1829, he had witnessed the last legal sati (ritual burning of a widow) in Bengal, and as lieutenant-governor he sought to enforce the anti-sati legislation that had been enacted soon after. He was also involved in enabling the Widow Remarriage Act to facilitate the remarriage of Hindu widows, that piece of legislation being a consequence of agitation by, among others, his former mentor, Vidyasagar. Indeed, Vidyasagar enjoyed a close relationship to Halliday during the 1850s, and this helped achieve changes in other social policy spheres, such as education. Halliday was an enthusiastic supporter of the despatch on education formulated by Charles Wood in 1854, and as a consequence various measures were implemented. These included the establishment of director of public instruction for the region and the incorporation of the University of Calcutta.

Halliday left the office of lieutenant-governor in May 1859. He had generally enjoyed the support of the governor-general during his tenure but he did antagonise some people within the official circles of the Indian government. Most notably, he had a long-running dispute with William Tayler, whom he considered to be incompetent. Halliday eventually removed Tayler from his position as Commissioner of Patna, following what Halliday considered to be a poor decision made by Tayler. This ultimately caused Tayler to resign and to bear a resentment that persisted until he died in 1892 and caused him publicly to seek redress for Halliday's actions.

== Subsequent life ==
In 1860 Halliday was appointed a Knight Commander of the Order of the Bath. He served as a Member of the Council of India from 1868 to 1886.

Halliday, who had a lifelong interest in music, was a player of the contrabass and from this acquired the nickname of "Big Fiddle". He married Eliza Barbara Macgregor, the daughter of an officer in the army of the East India Company, on 25 December 1834. She predeceased him, in 1886, having borne several children, one of whom — George Thomas Halliday — was later a Lieutenant-General in the Bengal Cavalry.

He died, aged 94, on 22 October 1901 and is buried in Brompton Cemetery, London.

His younger brother was General John Gustavus Halliday (1822–1917), and his grandson, Hastings Hadley D'Oyly (whom Clare Anderson thinks was probably named after Warren Hastings) was a member of the family of D'Oyly baronets.

== See also ==
- List of governors of Bengal Presidency

Government offices
Preceded by None	Lieutenant-governor of Bengal; 1854–1859	Succeeded by Sir John Peter Grant
