= Fort William, West Bengal =

Fort in Calcutta, India

Fort William
- Vijay Durg
- Kolkata, West Bengal, India
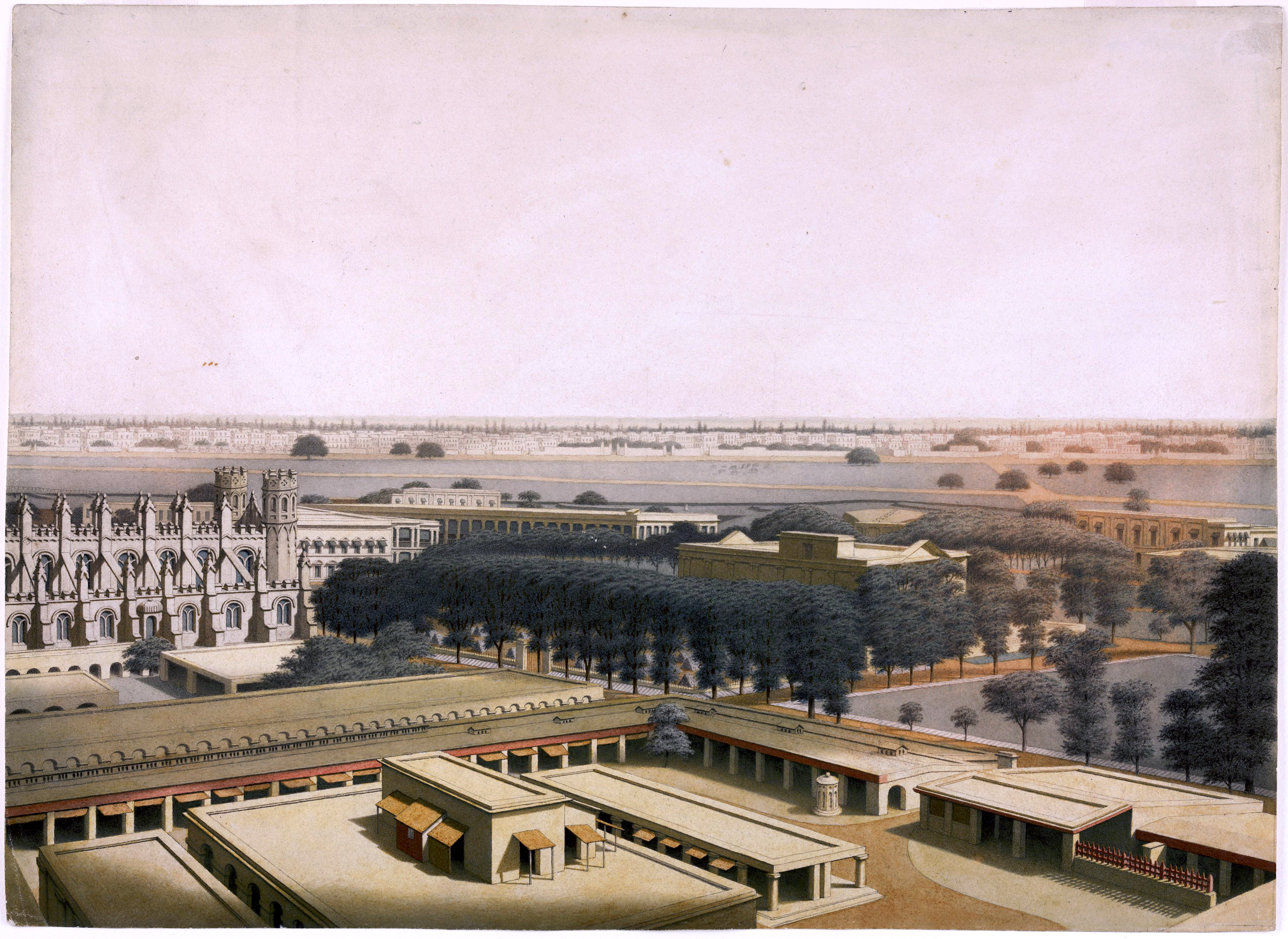
- Fort William, a view from the inside, c. 1828

Site information
- Type: Fortress, garrisoned and armoured army headquarters.
- Controlled by: Bengal Subah (before 1757); British East India Company (1757–1858); British Raj (1858–1947); Indian Army (1947–present)

Location
- Location within Kolkata
- Coordinates: 22.5577°N 88.3380°E

Site history
- Built: 1696–1702; 324 years ago
- In use: 1781–present
- Battles/wars: Battle of Plassey (1757)

Garrison information
- Garrison: Eastern Command

Fort William, officially Vijay Durg, is a fort in Hastings, Calcutta (Kolkata). It was built during the early years of Britain's administration of Bengal. It sits on the eastern banks of the River Hooghly, the major distributary of the River Ganga. One of Kolkata's most enduring British-era military fortifications, it extends over an area of seventy hectares.

The fort was named after King William III. In front of the Fort is the Maidan, the largest park in the country. An internal guard room became the Black Hole of Calcutta. Today the fort is the headquarters of Eastern Command of the Indian Army.

== History ==
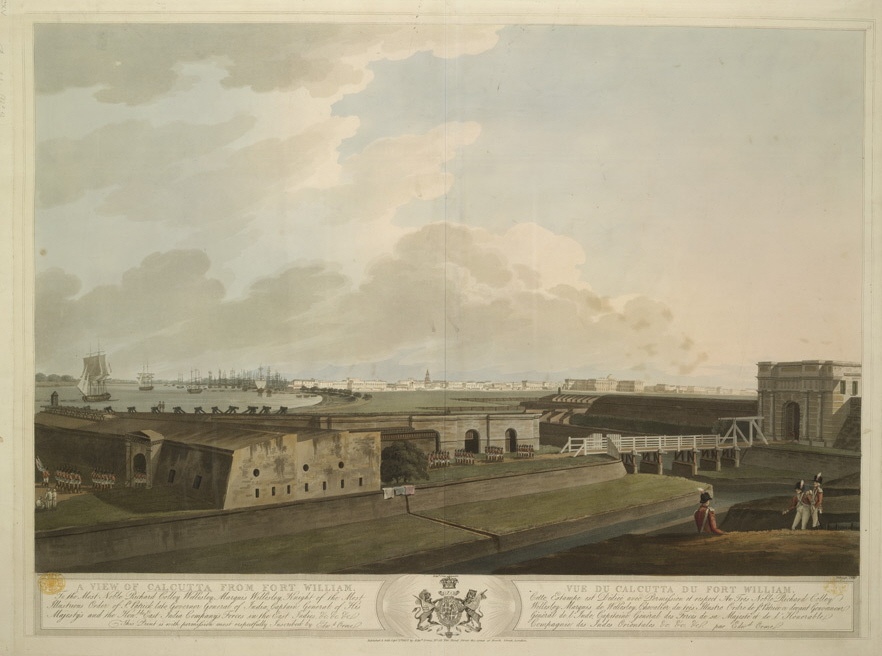
A view of Calcutta from Fort William (1807)

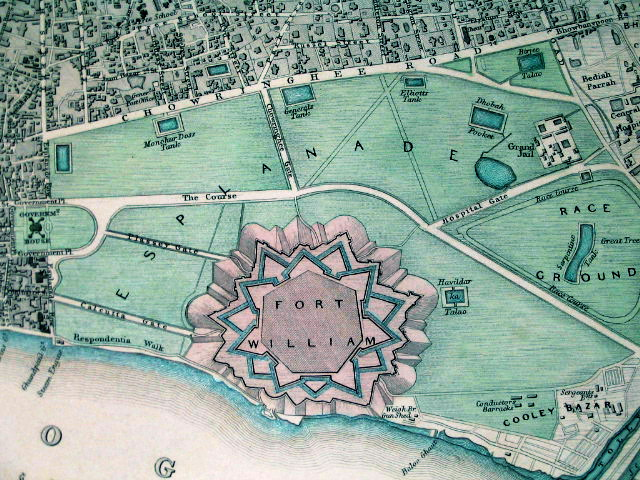
Plan (top-view) of Fort William, c. 1844

There are two Fort Williams. The original fort was built in the year 1696 by the British East India Company under the orders of Sir John Goldsborough which took a decade to complete. The permission was granted by Mughal Emperor Aurangzeb. Sir Charles Eyre started construction near the bank of the Hooghly River with the South-East Bastion and the adjacent walls. It was named after King William III in 1700. John Beard, Eyre's successor, added the North-East Bastion in 1701, and in 1702 started the construction of the Government House (Factory, see Factory (trading post)) at the centre of the fort. Construction ended in 1706. The original building had two stories and projecting wings. In 1756, the Nawab of Bengal, Siraj Ud Daulah, attacked the Fort, temporarily conquered the city, and changed its name to Alinagar. This led the British to build a new fort in the Maidan. Robert Clive started rebuilding the fort in 1758, after the Battle of Plassey (1757); construction was completed in 1781 at a cost of approximately two million pounds. The area around the Fort was cleared, and the Maidan became "the Lungs of Kolkata". It stretches for around 3 km in the north–south direction and is around 1 km wide. The headquarters of the Indian Ordnance Factories was established in 1775 at Fort William.

Today, Fort William is the property of the Indian Army. The headquarters of Eastern Command is based there, with provisions for accommodating 10,000 army personnel. The Army guards it heavily, and civilian entry is restricted.

Much of Fort William is unchanged, but St Peter's Church, which used to serve as a chaplaincy centre for the British citizens of Kolkata, is now a library for the troops of HQ Eastern Command. A major part of the land parcel is home to the family of Army.

A war memorial has been created at the entrance of the fort, and the fort also houses a museum which displays artifacts from the Indo-Pakistani War of 1971, especially those related to the battles in the Eastern sector and the Bangladesh Liberation War.

The fort was officially renamed to Vijay Durg, in honour of the oldest fort along Maharashtra's Sindhudurg coast, in 2025.

=== First Indian Masonic lodge ===
In 1730, Ralph Farrwinter and other members of the East India Company opened the first Indian Masonic lodge, a short time after the creation of the Grand Lodge of England in 1717.

== Structure ==
The Fort is built of brick and mortar in the shape of an irregular octagon with an area of 5 km^{2} (1.9 sq mi). Five of its sides face landward, and three towards the Hooghly River. The design is that of a star fort, suited to defence against cannon firing solid shot, and dates from before the advent of explosive shells. A dry moat 9 metres (30 ft) deep and 15 m (49 ft) broad surrounds the fort. The moat can be flooded but is designed as an area in which to use enfilade (or flanking) fire against any attackers reaching the walls. There are six gates: Chowringhee, Plassey, Calcutta, Water Gate, St Georges and the Treasury Gate. There are similar forts at places like Thalassery in Kerala.

== Gallery ==
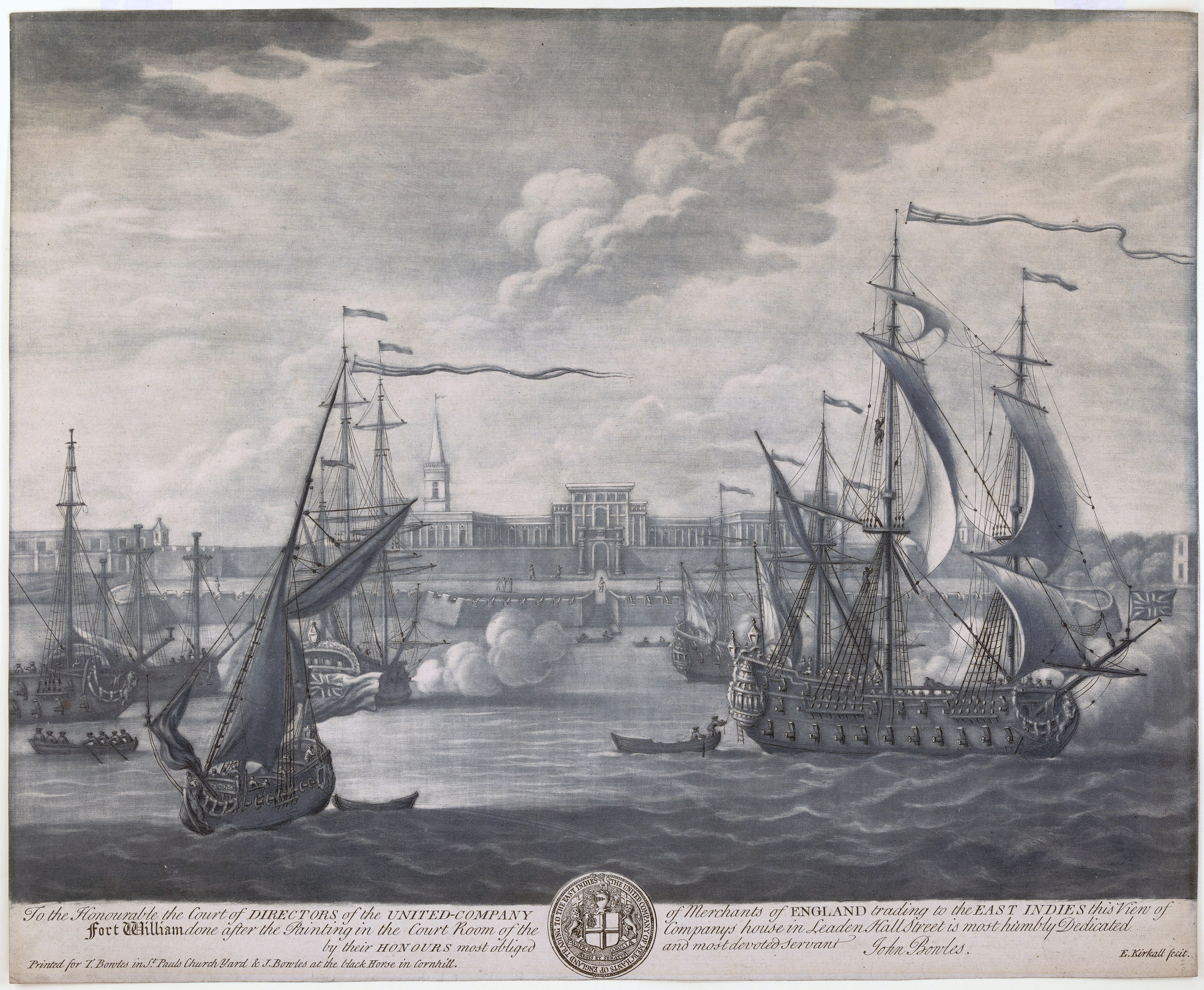
Fort William, 1735

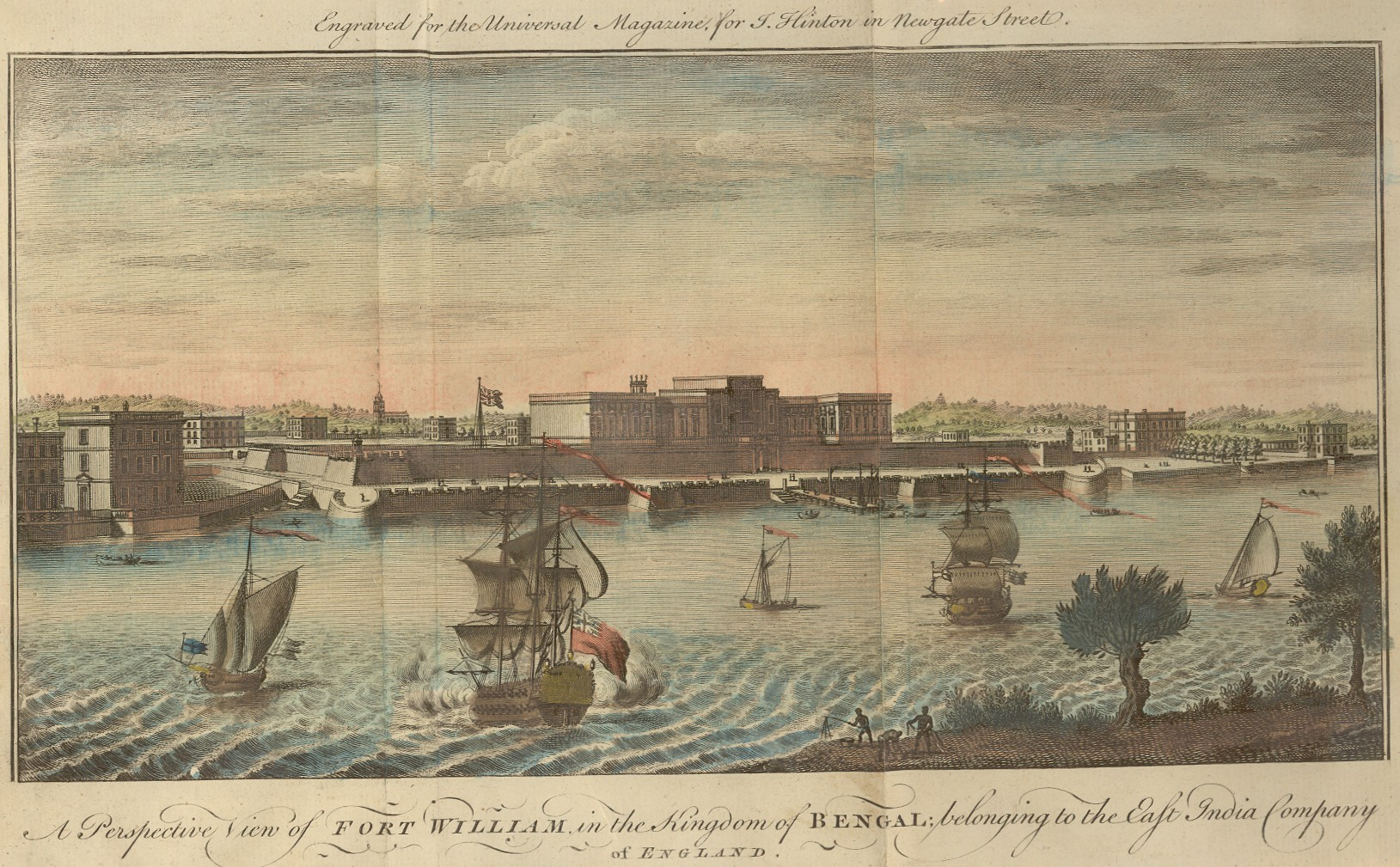
Fort William, by Jan Van Ryne, 1754

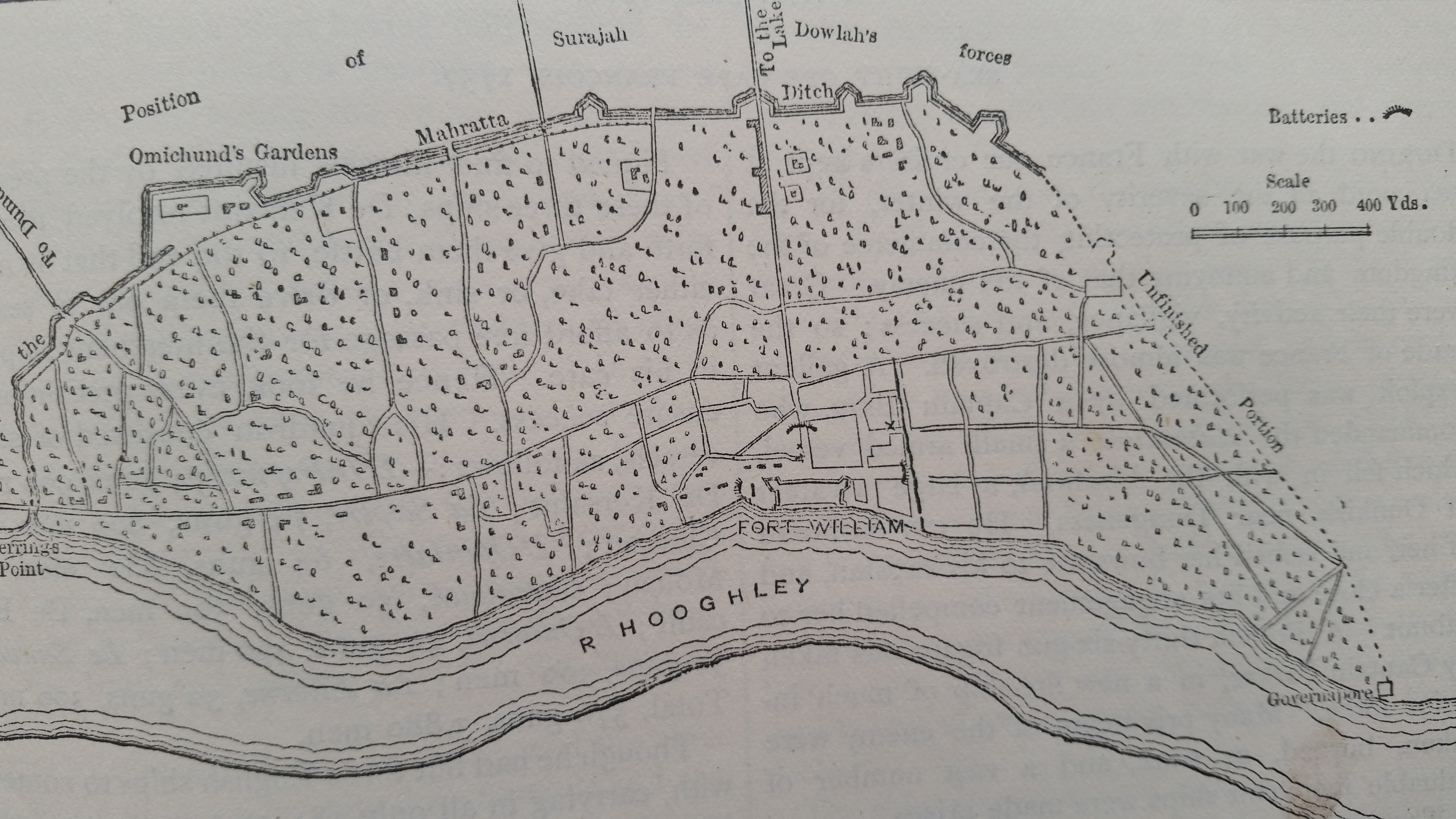
Fort William, Calcutta, 1756

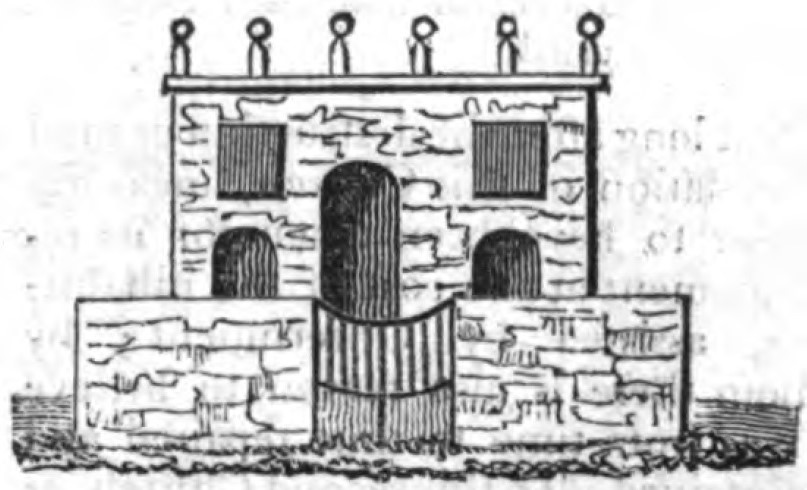
First English Chapel, Fort William, Calcutta. Raised in 1714, with contribution of Rs. 1000 by the East India Company (p. 197, March 1824)

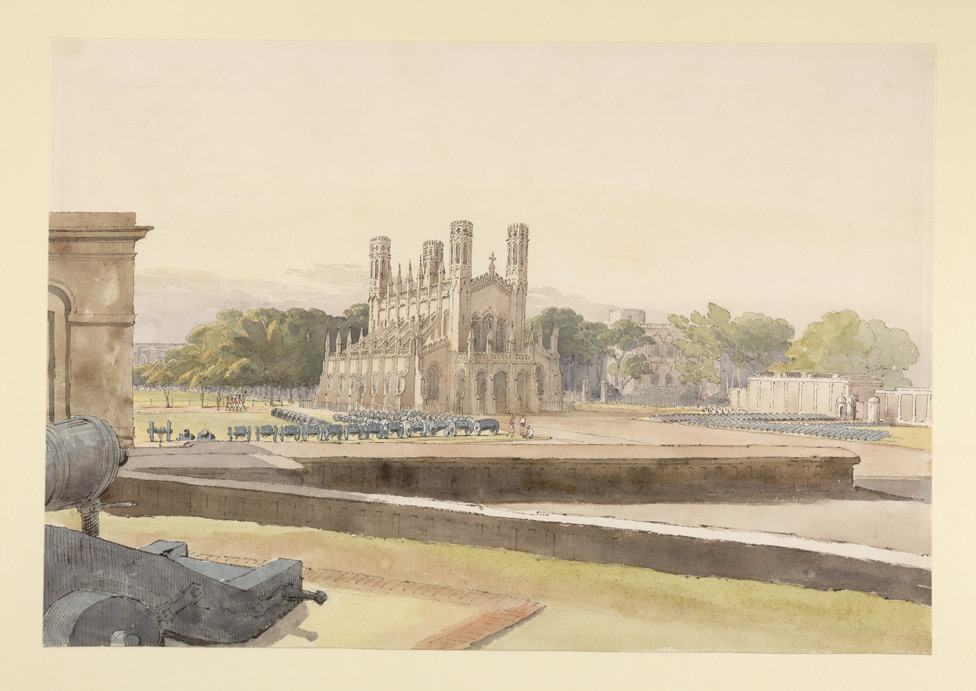
St Peter's Church, Fort William by William Prinsep 1835

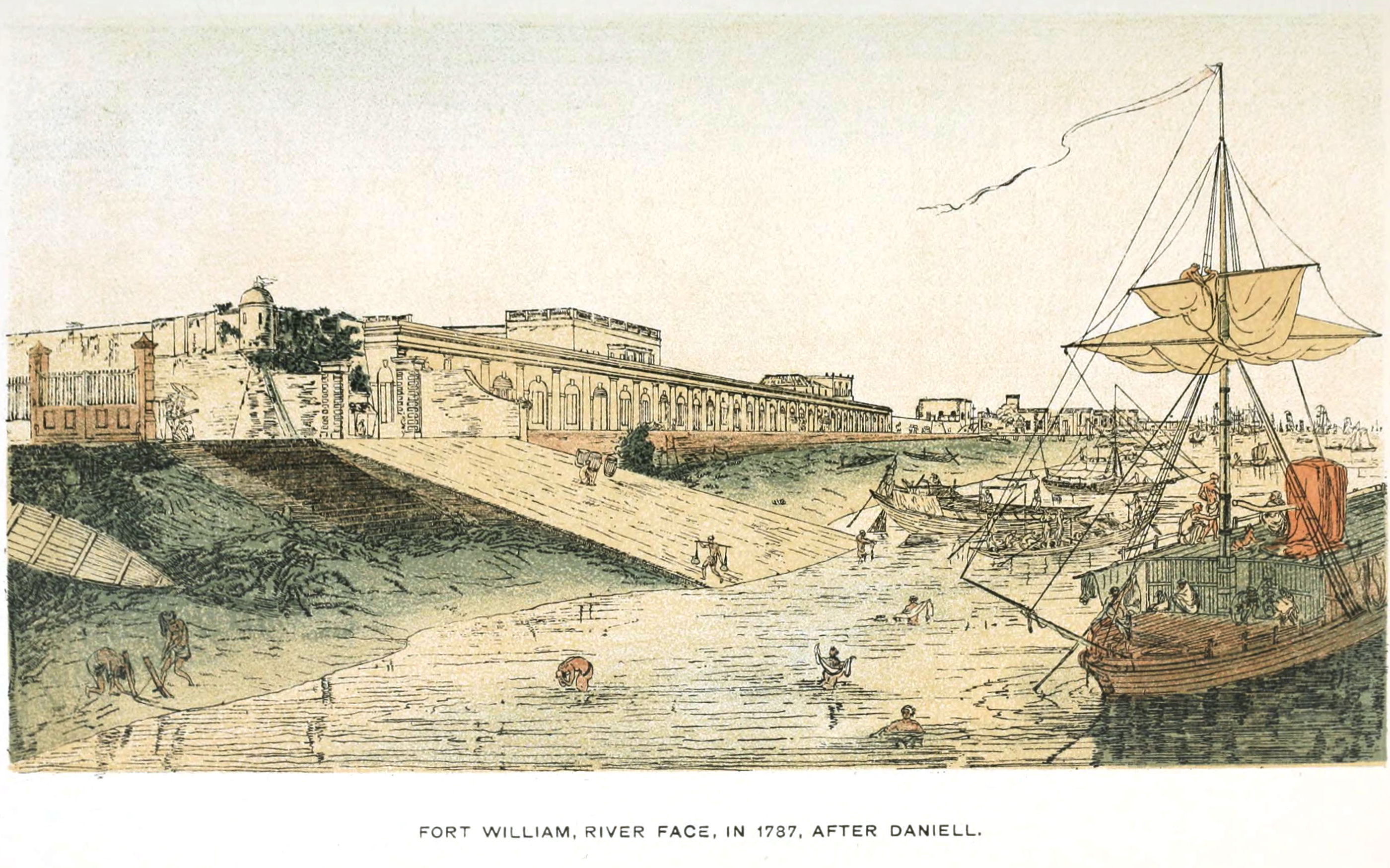
Fort William, River Face 1786 (from a coloured engraving by Thomas Daniell).

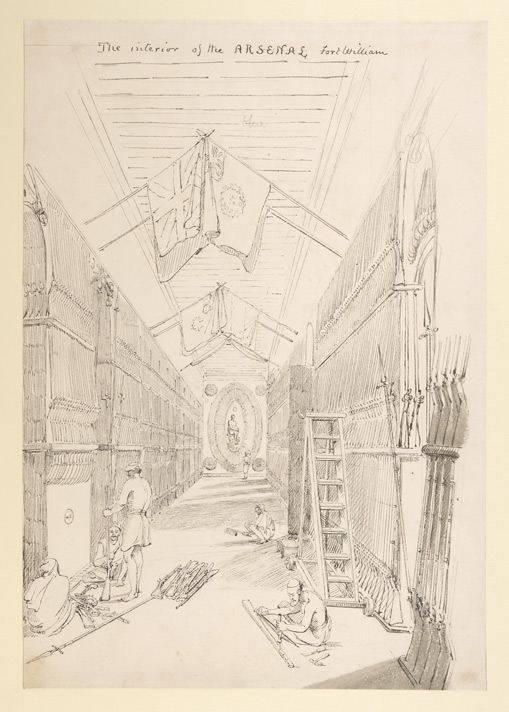
The interior of the Arsenal, Fort William by William Prinsep 1835

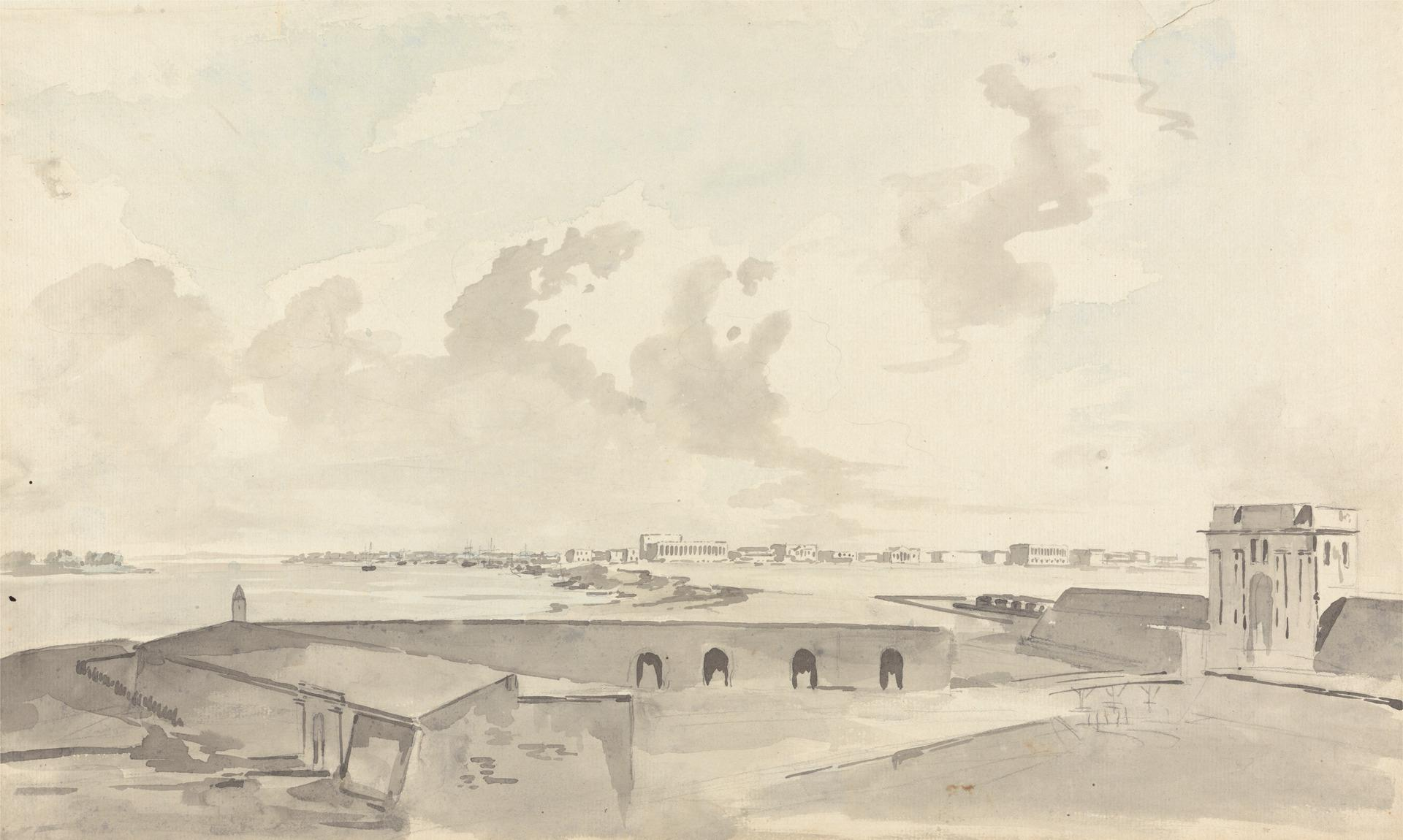
Fort William by Samuel Davis

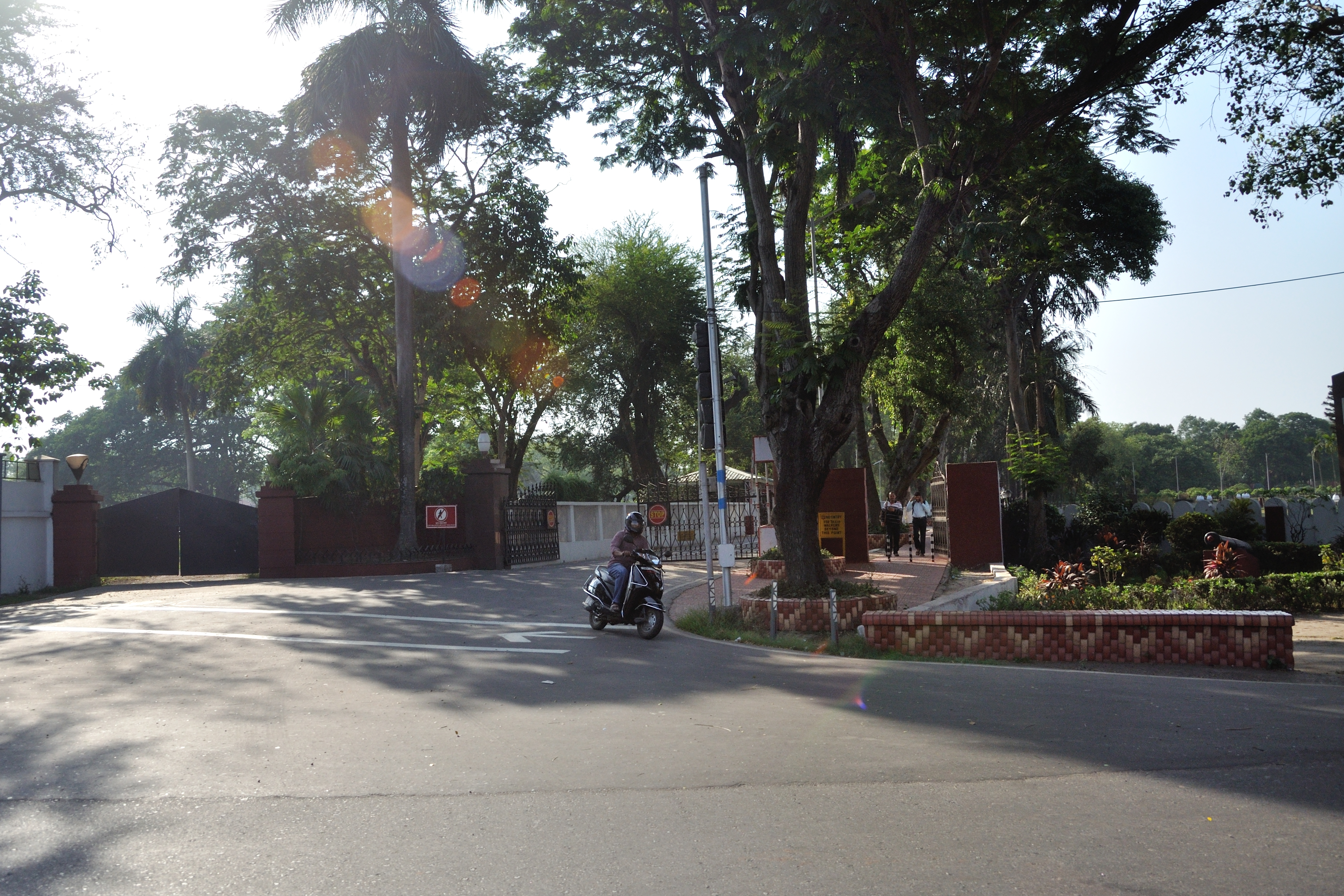
Main entrance, Fort William 2013

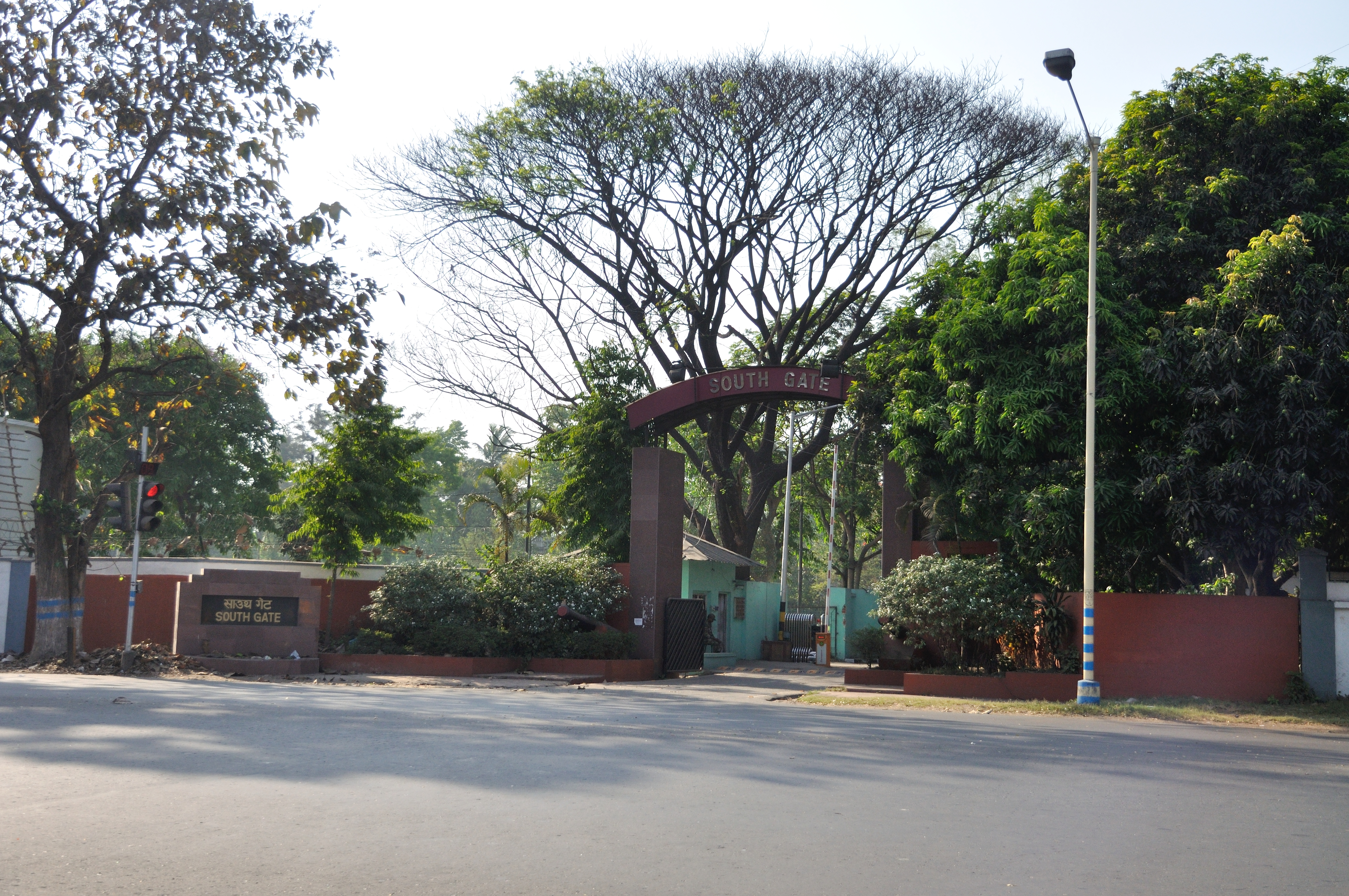
South gate, Fort William 2013

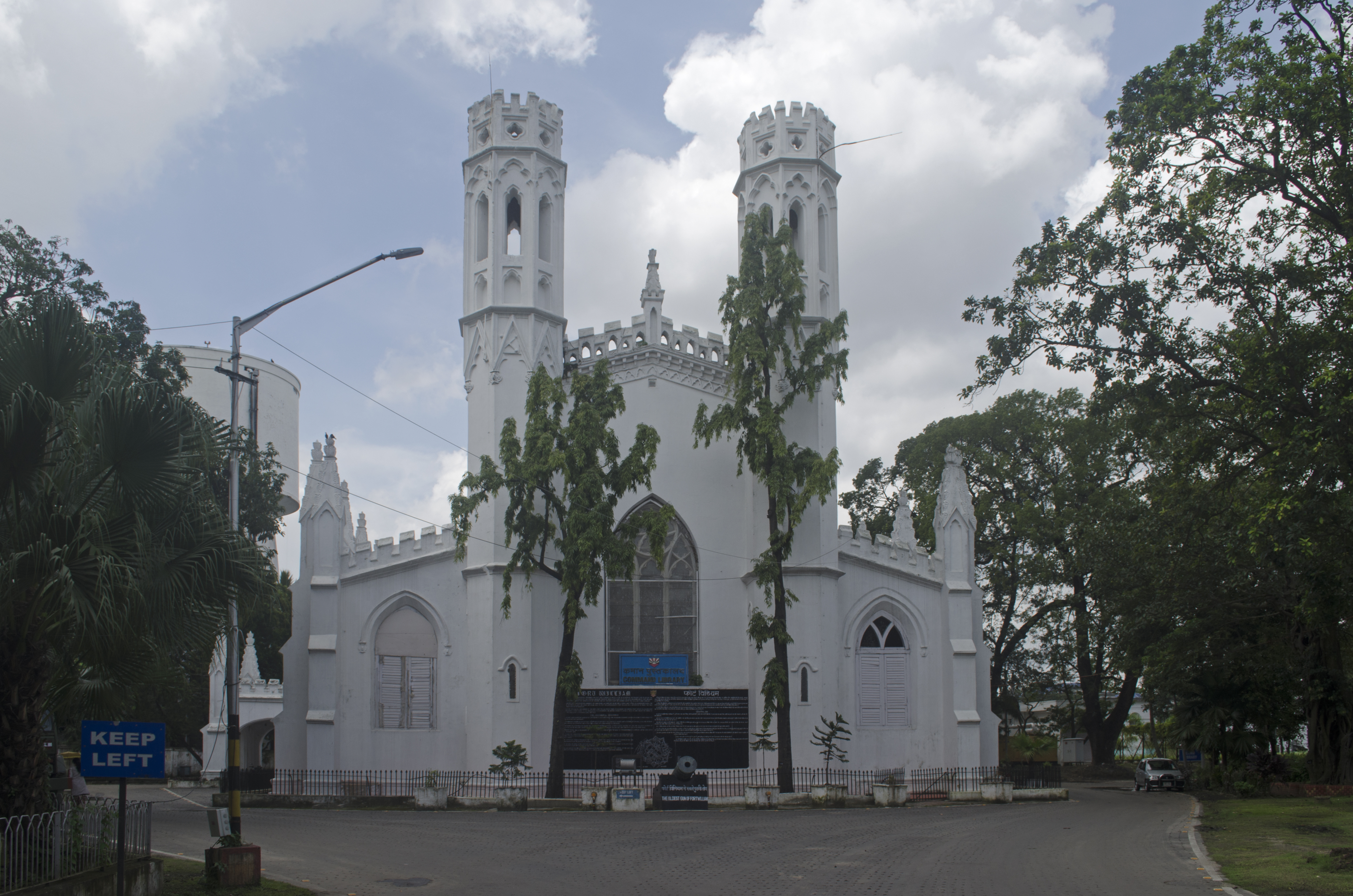
St. Peter's Church, Fort William, Kolkata

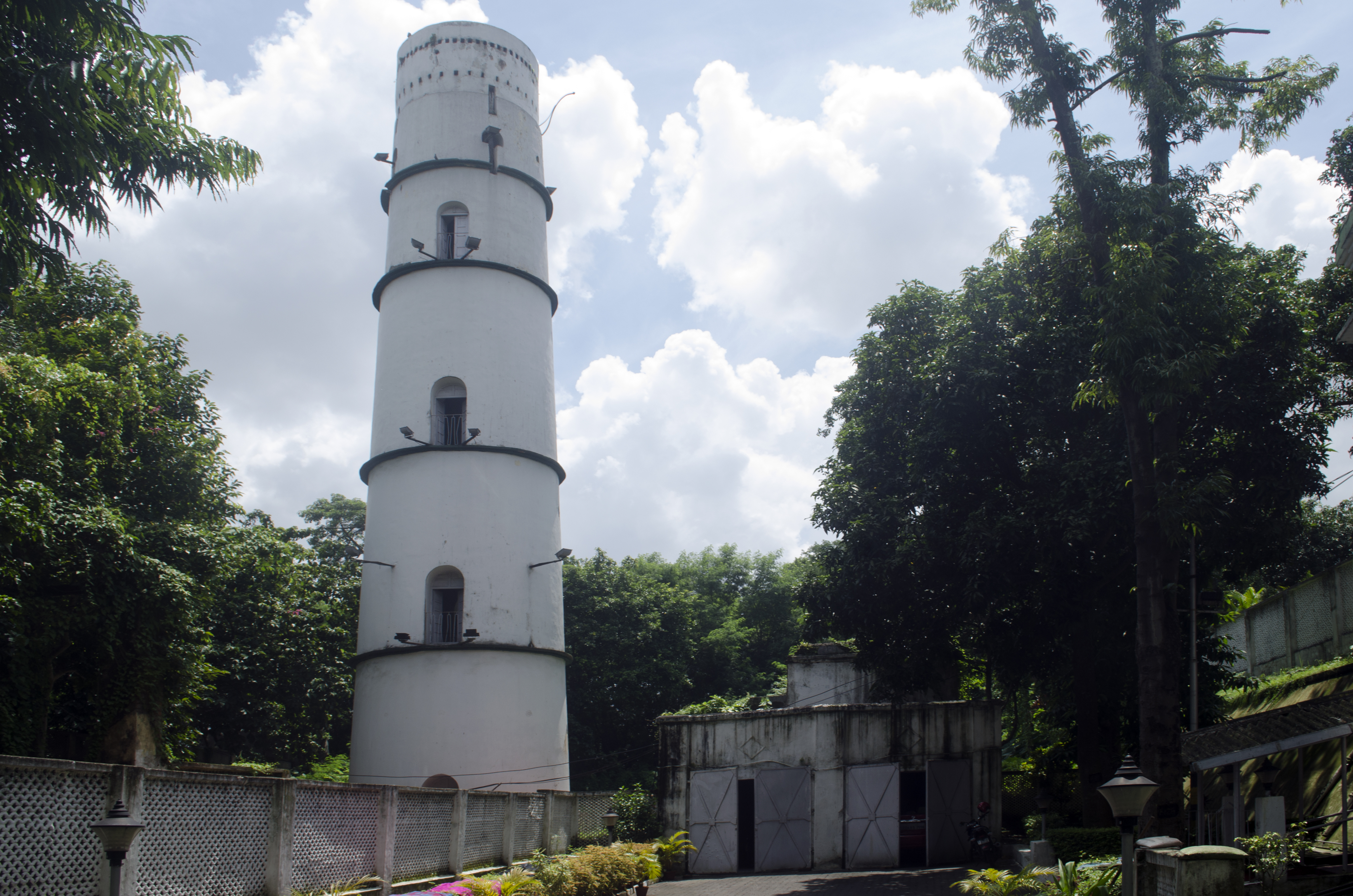
Semaphore Tower, Fort William, Kolkata

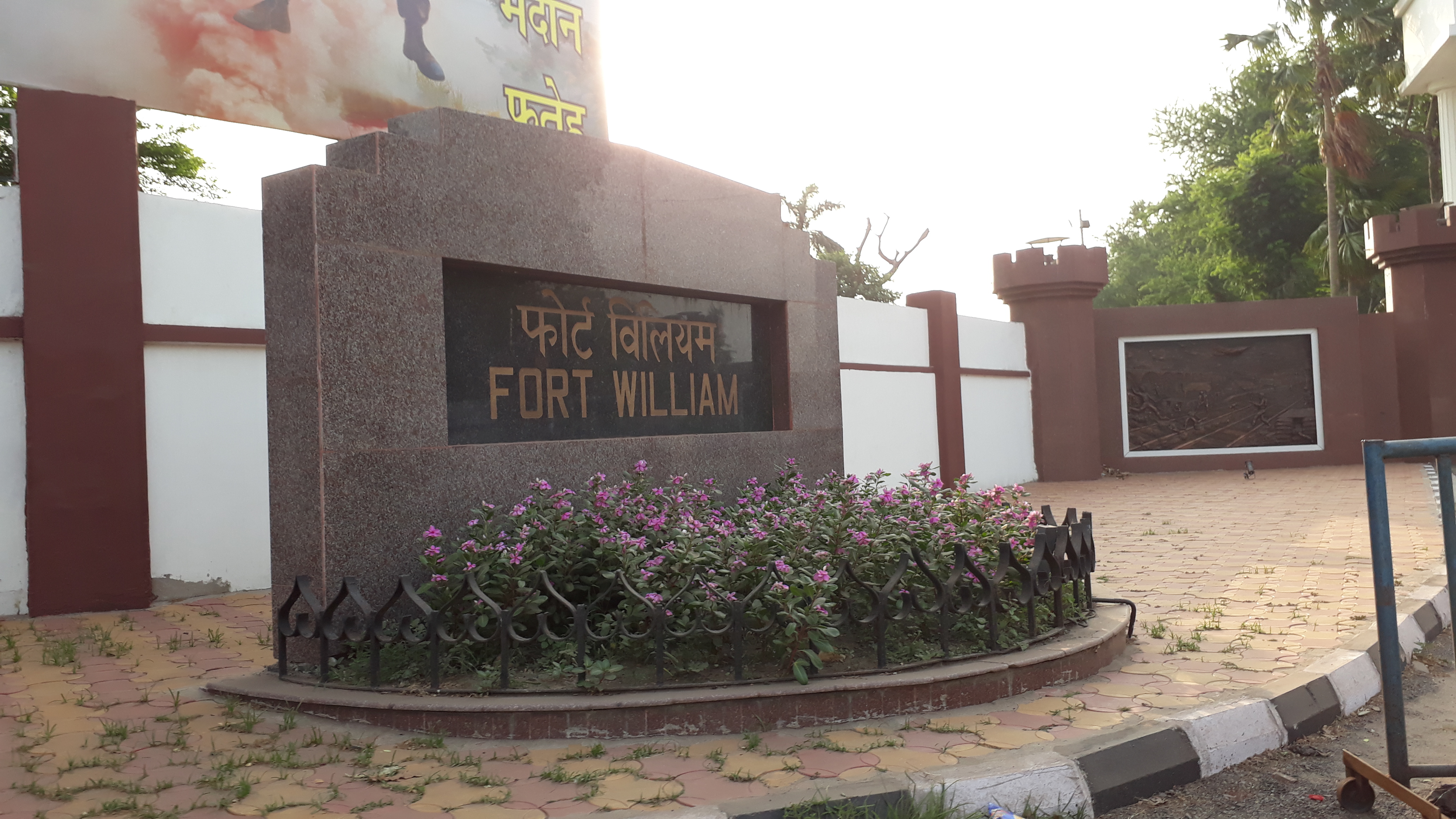
Main Gates of Fort William

== See also ==
- Fort William College
- Fort St. George, India
