= Job Charnock =

17th-century East India Company administrator; disputed founder of Calcutta/Kolkata

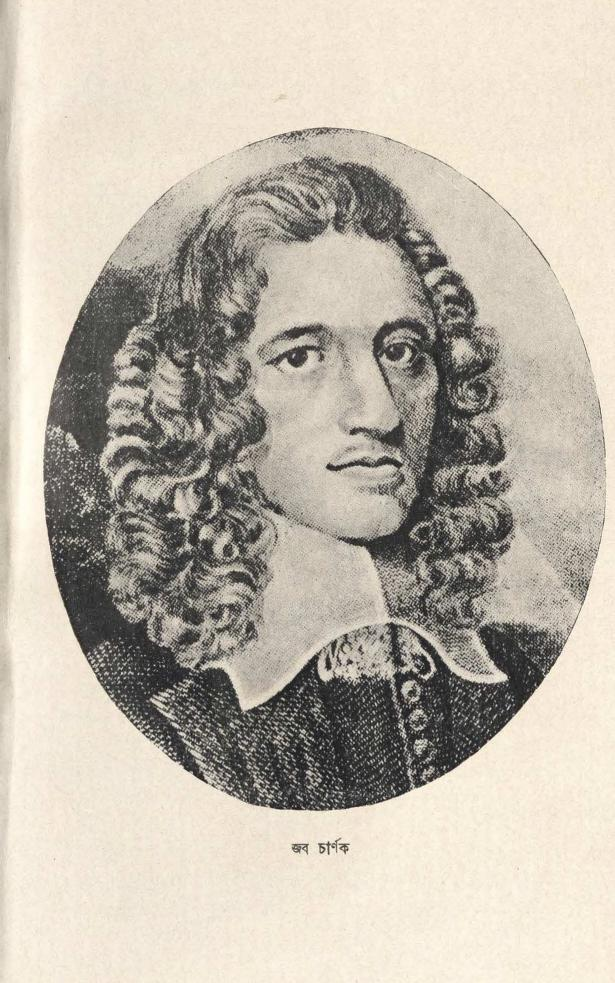
- Born: c. 1630; London, England
- Died: 10 January 1692; Calcutta, Bengal, Mughal Empire
- Occupations: Administrator and businessman
- Known for: Development of Calcutta

Signature
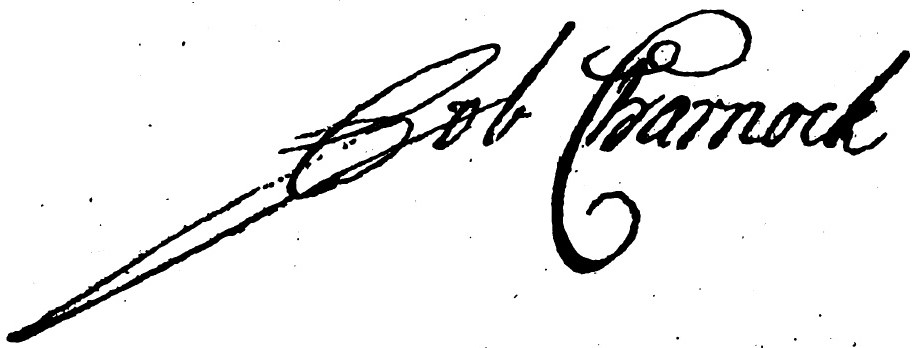

Job Charnock (/dʒoʊb/; c. 1630–1692/1693) was an English administrator with the East India Company. He is widely regarded by historians as the founder of the city of Calcutta (Kolkata); however, this view was challenged in court, and in 2003 the Calcutta High Court ruled that he ought not to be regarded as the sole founder.

== Early life and career ==
Charnock came from a Lancashire family and was the second son of Richard Charnock of London. Stephen Charnock (1628–1680) was probably his elder brother. He was part of a private trading enterprise in the employ of the merchant Maurice Thomson between 1650 and 1653, but in January 1658 he joined the East India Company's service in Bengal, where he was stationed at Hoogly.

Charnock was described as a silent, morose man, not popular among his contemporaries, but as "always a faithful man to the Company", which rated his services very highly. In addition to his business acumen, he won the Company's esteem by stamping out smuggling among his less scrupulous colleagues. His zeal in this regard made him enemies who throughout his life spread malicious gossip to discredit him.

== Patna factory ==
Charnock was entrusted with procuring the Company's saltpetre and appointed to the centre of the trade, Patna in Bihar, on 2 February 1659. After four years at the factory he contemplated returning to England, but the Company persuaded him to stay on by promoting him to the position of chief factor in 1664.

Charnock took a Hindu common-law wife. Historian P. Thankappan Nair places the event in 1678 or a little earlier. A Company servant, Alexander Hamilton, later wrote that she had been a sati and that Charnock, smitten by her beauty, had rescued her from her husband's funeral pyre by the Ganges in Bihar, but Nair dismisses Hamilton's statement as fiction. She was said to be a fifteen-year-old Rajput princess. Charnock named her Maria, and soon after he was accused of secretly converting to Hinduism. Though he remained a devout Christian, the story of his conversion and moral laxity was so widely believed that it became a cautionary tale in a later more puritanical age.

Charnock was promoted to the rank of senior merchant by 1666, and became third in the Bengal hierarchy in 1676. He was now the Company's longest-serving servant in Bengal, and applied for a transfer to a more senior post. After some haggling due to difficulties with resentful colleagues who hoped to see him sent away to Madras, on 3 January 1679 the directors promoted him to the position of head at Cossimbazar, second in charge of the Company's operations in Bengal.

== Rivalry with William Hedges ==
Cossimbazar was notorious as a smugglers' den, and when Charnock assumed his new post on Christmas Day 1680 it was over the objections of Streynsham Master, president at Madras, who oversaw the Company's operations in the whole Bay of Bengal. The directors reprimanded Master for his interference, but although they agreed to free Bengal from oversight by the Madras presidency, Charnock's hopes of promotion to the top Bengal post at Hooghly were dashed when in 1681 the directors sent out one of their own, William Hedges, as agent of the bay and governor of Bengal.

On Hedges' arrival at Hooghly, Charnock found him to be an officious neophyte. The rivalry between the Company's two most senior servants in Bengal was aggravated by the intrigues of Company servants and interlopers keen to undermine Charnock's authority and resume their smuggling operations on the side. Charnock was further irritated by the fact that members of Hedges' staff from Hooghly were regularly sabotaging their colleagues' work in Cossimbazar by poaching the local commodities. In 1684 the exasperated directors restored supervisory control over Bengal to the new president at Madras, William Gyfford, and replaced Hedges in Bengal with John Beard, the elder.

== Chief agent in Bengal ==
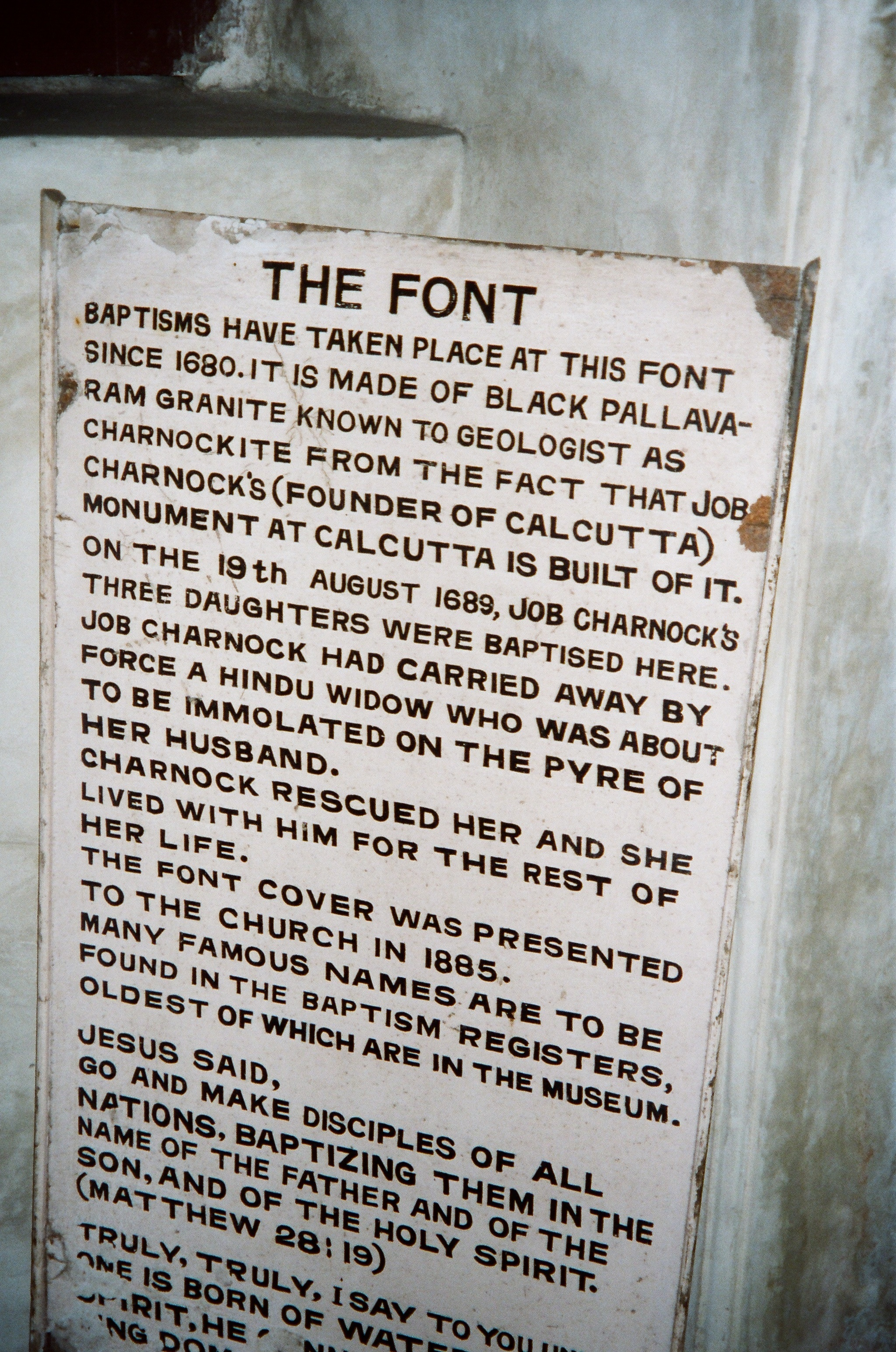
Plaque with details of Baptism of Charnock's daughters, on Baptismal Font at St. Mary's Church, Fort St. George, Madras

When Beard died on 28 August 1685, Charnock finally assumed the position of agent and chief in the Bay of Bengal. By this time a crisis had arisen over restrictions on trade, and in particular the Mughal nawab's imposition of a customs duty of 3½ per cent, which the English refused to pay on the grounds that it was in breach of the original firman which exempted them from customs. Relations with the nawab deteriorated into violent conflict. When Charnock received word of his promotion, Cossimbazar was under siege, and he could not leave to take up his responsibilities at Hooghly until April 1686. On his arrival he continued to resist what he saw as extortion, by force or persuasion, and when these did not serve, by taking the Company's business elsewhere.

Finding himself again besieged at Hooghly, Charnock put the Company's goods and servants on board his light vessels. Pursued by the nawab's troops, on 20 December 1686 he dropped down the river 27 miles (43 km) to Sutanuti, then "a low swampy village of scattered huts", but a place well chosen for the purpose of defence. From Sutanuti he moved on to Hijili in February 1687, where he was again besieged from March to June 1687. After negotiating a truce and safe passage, he transferred the factory back to Sutanuti in November 1687.

It was probably during this interlude at Sutanuti that Charnock suffered a personal loss in the death of his wife Maria. They had been together for some twenty-five years. They had one son (who would predecease his father), and three surviving daughters who were later baptised in Madras. Although Maria was buried like a Christian, and not cremated as a Hindu, Charnock was said to sacrifice a cock over her grave each year on the anniversary of her death, "after the Pagan Manner". University librarian Prabodh Biswas writes that the ritual resembles the Sufi worship of the panch peer or "five saints", a custom which Charnock "is said to have adopted". He was also said to have built his garden house at Barrackpore so as to be near her grave.

Even though Charnock had married a native woman, he had a certain animosity towards the natives due to his sufferings at the hands of the native rulers. Captain Hamilton had said, "the Governor (Charnock) at the hour of dinner and near his dining room had delinquents (native) punished that he might satiate himself with their cries."

== Chittagong expedition ==
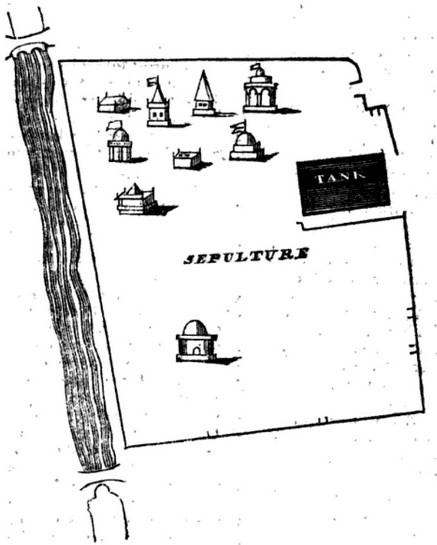
Sketch of Job Charnock's Cemetery, made before 1742 (p.196), March 1824

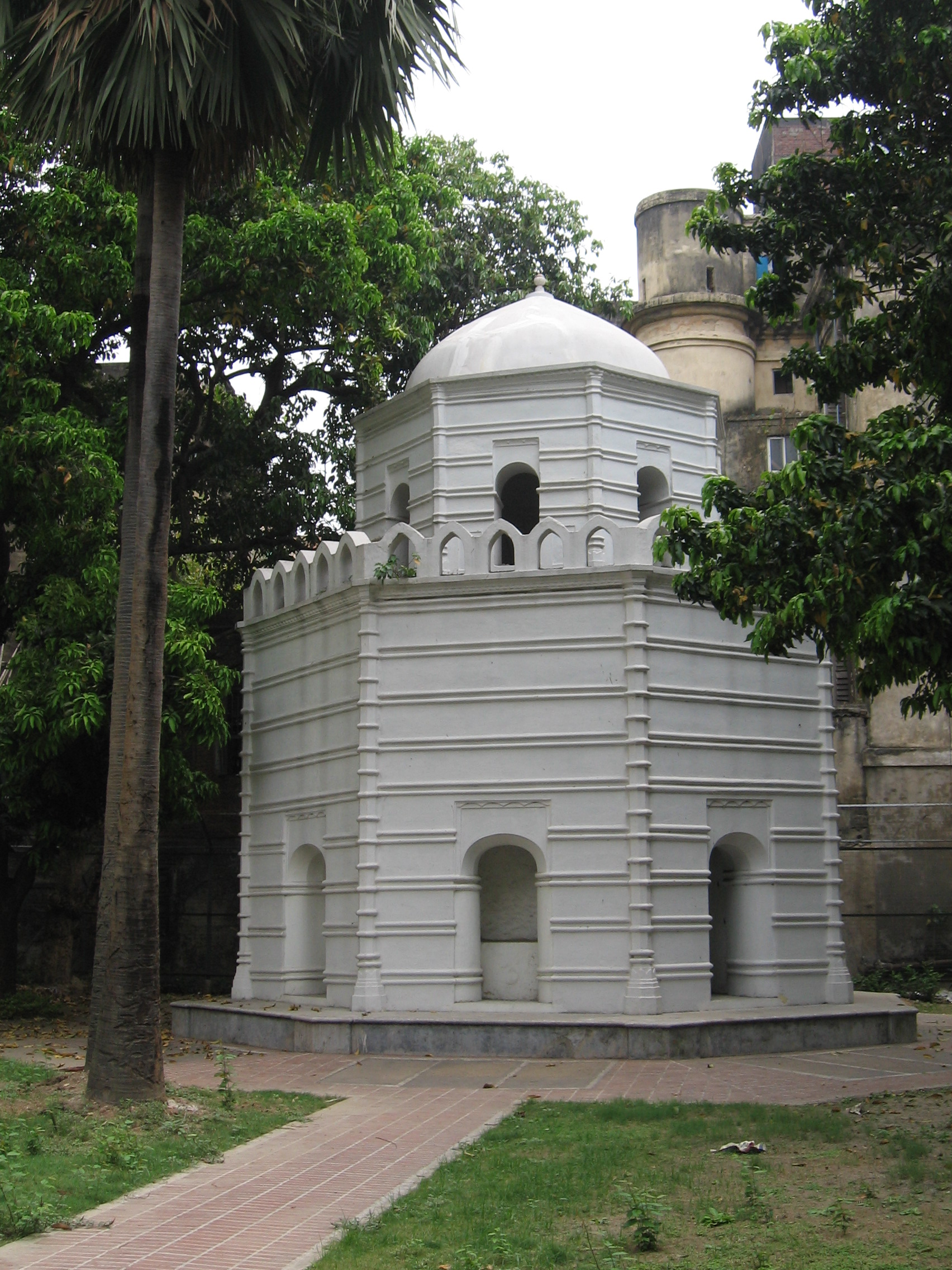
Job Charnock's mausoleum

By 1686 the secret committee of the court of directors in London had decided the Company should establish a fortified settlement in Bengal, to resist what they regarded as arbitrary exactions and violent harassment by Mughal officials:

we have no remedy left, But either to desert our Trade or we must draw that sord his Majesty hath intrusted us with to vindicate the Rights and Honour of the English Nation in India.

Accordingly, in September 1688 the largest naval force the Company had ever assembled swept into the bay, with orders to blockade the ports and arrest the ships of the Grand Mughal, and, if this did not bring satisfaction, to take the town of Chittagong. Beard being dead, authority devolved to a reluctant Charnock as commander-in-chief. As he anticipated, Chittagong proved remote and unviable. Sutanuti had in the meantime been razed by the nawab's troops, therefore the squadron sailed for Madras, arriving on 7 March 1689.

== Calcutta ==
Job Charnock founding Calcutta, 1690

In Madras Charnock persuaded the reluctant council, over the objections of its president, his old opponent William Hedges, that Sutanuti was the best place to establish the headquarters in Bengal, because of its defensible position and its deep-water anchorage for the fleet. The selection of the future capital of India was entirely due to his stubborn resolution.

In March 1690, the Company received permission from Aurangzeb in Delhi to re-establish a factory in Bengal, and on 24 August 1690 Charnock returned to set up headquarters in the place he called Calcutta; the appointment of a new nawab ensured this agreement was honoured, and on 10 February 1691 an imperial grant was issued for the English to "contentedly continue their trade".

The directors showed their approval of Charnock's initiative by making his agency independent of Madras on 22 January 1692. Thereafter "Calcutta grew steadily till it became India's 'city of cities' and capital".

== Mausoleum ==
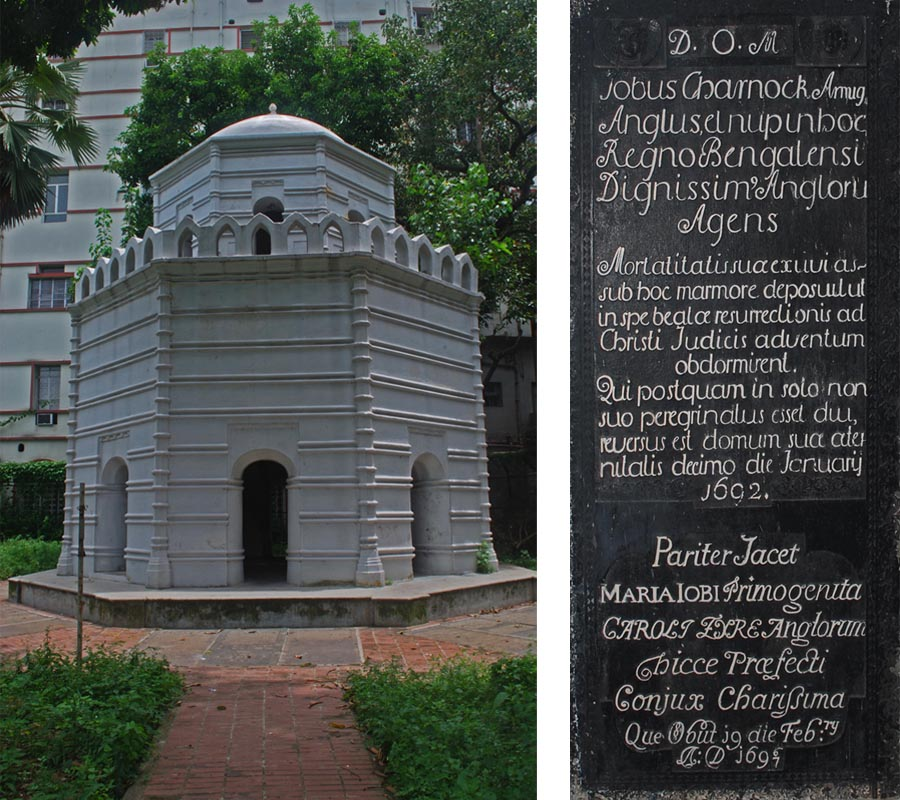
Job Charnock's Tomb and epitaph

Charnock died in Calcutta on 10 January 1692 (or 1693 according to an exhibition at the Victoria Memorial which points out that the 1692 date on his gravestone refers to an old calendar system by which the new year began in March), shortly after the death of his son. His three surviving daughters all remained in Calcutta: Mary (d. 19 February 1697), Elizabeth (d. August 1753), and Katherine (d. 21 January 1701); all found wealthy English husbands. Mary married the President and Governor of Fort William, Sir Charles Eyre.

A mausoleum was erected in 1695 over Charnock's simple grave by Eyre, his son-in-law and successor. It can still be seen in the graveyard of St. John's Church, the second oldest Protestant church in Calcutta after John Zacharias Kiernander's Old Mission Church (1770), and is now regarded as a national monument. The stone for the mausoleum was brought from the St. Thomas Mount, Madras. Later in 1893 geogologist T. H. Holland found it to be a different form of granite and named it Charnockite after Job Charnock.
It is inscribed with the Latin epitaph:

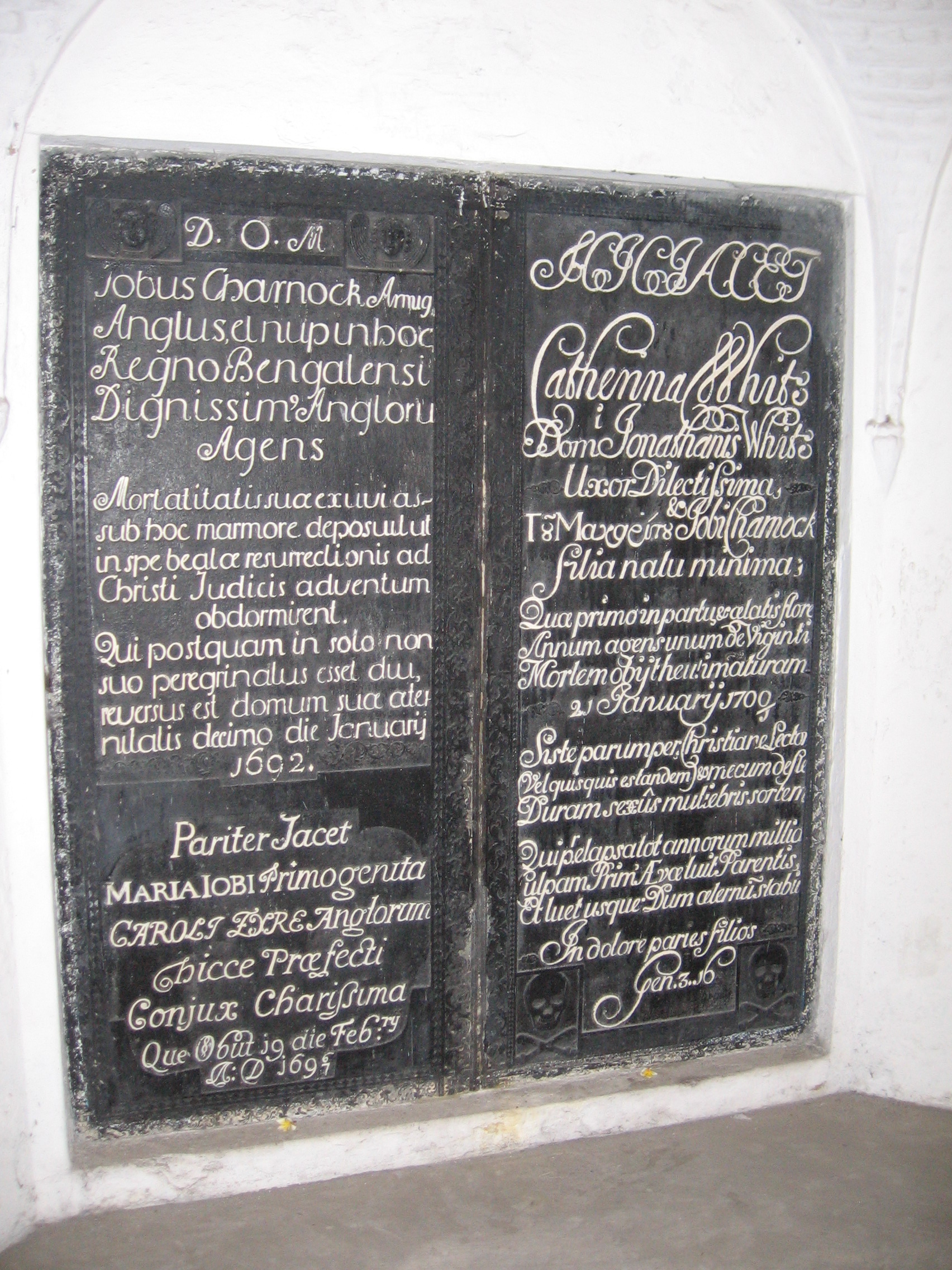
The marble slab in the mausoleum

D.O.M. Jobus Charnock, Armiger Anglus et nup. in hoc regno. Bengalensi dignissimum Anglorum Agens Mortalitatis suae exuvias sub hoc marmore deposuit, ut in spe beatae resurrectionis ad Christi judicis adventum obdormirent. Qui postquam in solo non-suo peregrinatus esset diu reversus est domum suae aeternitatis decimo die 10th Januarii 1692. Pariter Jacet Maria, Iobi Primogenita, Carole Eyre Anglorum hicci Praefecti. Conjux charissima. Quae Obiit 19 die Februarii A.D. 1696–97.

Translation:

In the hands of God Almighty, Job Charnock, English knight and recently the most worthy agent of the English in this Kingdom of Bengal, left his mortal remains under this marble so that he might sleep in the hope of a blessed resurrection at the coming of Christ the Judge. After he had journeyed onto foreign soil he returned after a little while to his eternal home on the 10th day of January 1692. By his side lies Mary, first-born daughter of Job, and dearest wife of Charles Eyre, the English prefect in these parts. She died on 19 February AD 1696–97.

The inscription omits any mention of Charnock's Hindu wife Maria. Eyre may have hoped to make the public image of his predecessors and in-laws seem more respectable to the growing Anglican community in Calcutta. Even so, the monument was built by Bengali craftsmen, and its incorporation of Indo-Islamic design reflects the intersection of two cultures which their union personified.

== Assessment ==
In the verdict of Scottish historian Sir Henry Yule:

We cannot claim a high character for Charnock. The charge of cruelty is based, we presume, on the tales of Alexander Hamilton; it is impossible to view this as more than gossip. The charges of vacillation and timidity are based, we again presume, on the fault found by the Court with his conduct of the first exodus from the Upper Hugly. We can see that Job mistrusted (though we apprehend justly) the wisdom of the orders given, especially as to the seizure of Chittagong; and his own notion of occupying Hijili as a fortified settlement showed what may doubtless seem strange ignorance of the sanitary condition of such a position. But setting aside this as a serious mistake he showed no lack of spirit in his action since February, 1687, when he saw that the Nabob and his people by their negotiations were only trying to gain time, and certainly none in the defence of the miserable position in Hijili, and no lack of resource in the notable stratagem by which he imposed upon the enemy! . . . My view of him, pieced together from the fragmentary impressions which are alone available, would be that of an imperfectly educated and coarse and wilful but strong man who had spent his life in almost isolated positions among natives and had been deeply tinged with native habits of thought and action, but who maintained a general loyalty to the Company whom he served, though he was by no means as scrupulous as they gave him credit for being.

== Ruling of Calcutta High Court ==
A Calcutta High Court ruling on 16 May 2003, based on a report from a committee found that a "highly civilised society" and "an important trading centre" had existed on the site of Calcutta long before Charnock established his settlement. They also found the place then called Kalikatah was an important religious centre due to the existence of the Kali temple in the adjacent village of Kalighat. The first literary reference to the site is found in Bipradas Pipilai's magnum opus Manasa Mangala which dates back to 1495. Abul Fazl's Ain-I-Akbari dating 1596 also mentions the place. The Sabarna Roy Choudhury family was granted the Jagirdari of Kalikatah by Emperor Jehangir in 1608. The report added that there are multiple founders: Charnock, Eyre and Goldsborough, Lakshmikanta Majumdar, the Sett Bysack families, Gobindapur and Sabarna Choudhuries (who sold land to the English). The court argued that Charnock ought not to be regarded as the sole founder of Calcutta, and ordered government authorities to purge his name from all textbooks and official documents containing the history of the founding story of the city.

Other historians have placed greater emphasis on Charnock’s role in the city’s founding. Writing in the Oxford Dictionary of National Biography, historian I. B. Watson argues:

It is mostly due to Charnock's imagination, his vision, and his commitment to what he considered was right that the English transformed three small villages on an inhospitable tract of riverbank into what was to become the premier city in India ... Of all the great cities of modern India, Calcutta it is that owes its existence to the vision and commitment of one man.

== See also ==
- Charnockite
