= Mughal–Safavid War (1637–1638) =

Mughal Persian wars

- Part of Mughal–Persian Wars
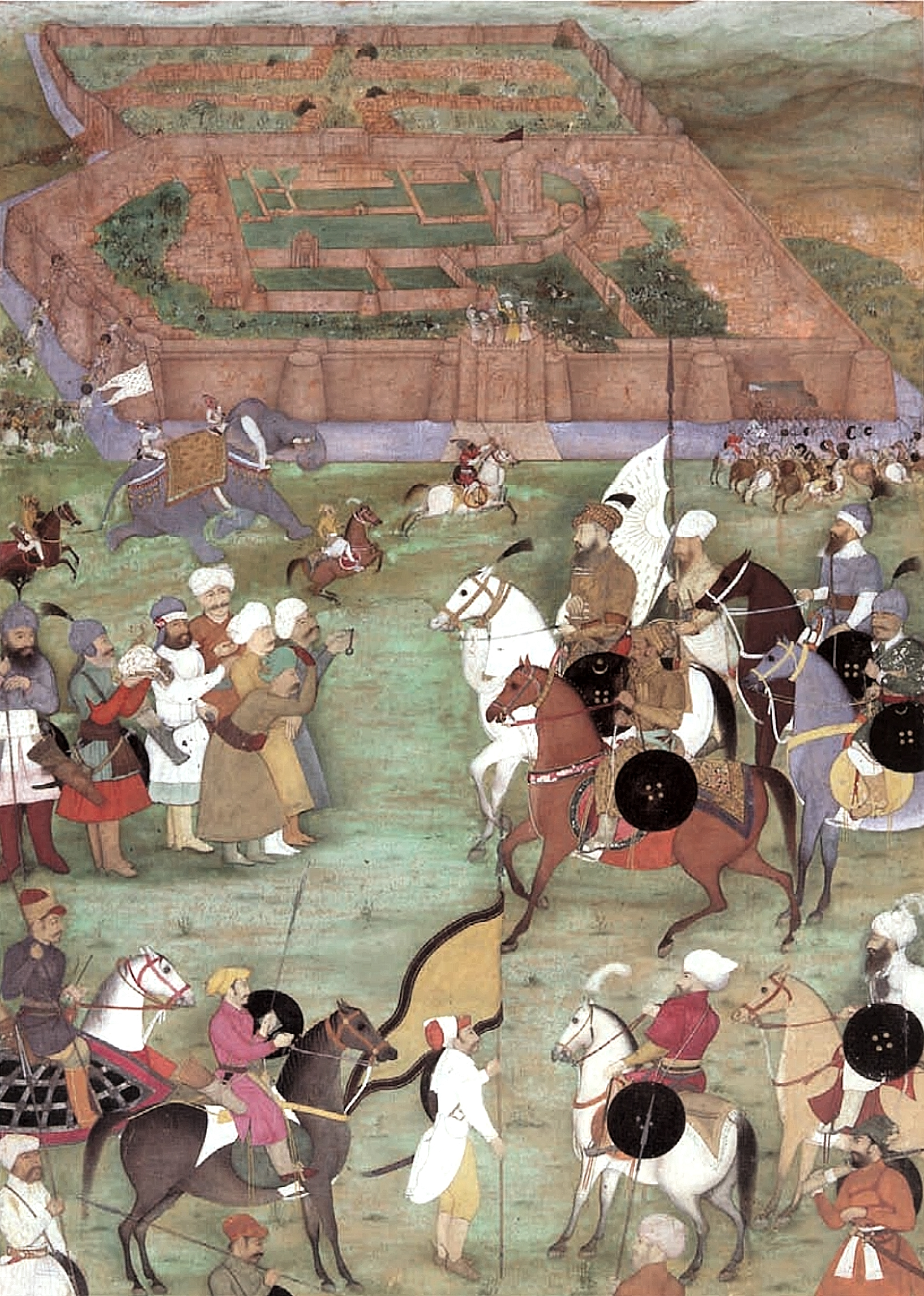
- Surrender of the Safavids under Mihrab Khan to the Mughal general Qulij Khan Turani at the Siege of Bost (1638).
Date	1637–1638
Location	Kandahar, Bost
Result	Mughal victory
Territorial changes	Kandahar, Bost fall back to Mughal India

Belligerents
Safavid Iran	Mughal India

Commanders and leaders
Safi of Persia; Ali Mardan Khan (surrendered); Siyavush Qullar-aqasi	Shah Jahan; Dara Shikoh; Qulij Khan Turani; Sa‘id Khan

The Mughal–Persian war (1637–1638) is a conflict which took place in 1638, between Safavid Empire of Persia and Mughal Empire of Hindustan. The main events were the Mughal victories of the Fall of Kandahar (1638) and the Siege of Bost (1638), which the additional capture of several smaller Afghanistan fortresses previously under the control of the Safavids. The war resulted in a decisive victory for the Mughals, especially marked by the surrender of Kandahar by Ali Mardan Khan.

== Background ==
Mughals had previously lost the city of Kandahar to the Safavids. It was considered vital for the Mughal Empire that the twin gateway-cities to Hindustan, i.e. Kabul and Kandahar, be brought under Mughal rule. Central Asian trade provided the Mughals with warhorses, without which not only the military forces would be incapacitated, but could also potentially spark tribal revolts and foreign invasions. Kandahar in particular was at the crossroads of a number of major commercial trade routes in Central Asia. The two cities were thus the subject of deep strategic concern.

== War ==
In 1639, the armies of Shah Safi of Persia captured Bamyan and it appeared that they would attack Kandahar next. In 1646, Shah Jahan, assisted by Kamran Khanand Malik Maghdood, had marched on Kandahar and negotiated the surrender from the Persian commander, Ali Mardan Khan. He expected the Persians to attempt to regain the city soon and so he ordered that the wall be repaired rapidly while a large Mughal army based in Kabul protected the area. In 1646, when no Persian attack came, the Emperor sent his son, Murad Baksh, to invade Uzbek-controlled Badakhshan. In the following year, Aurangzeb, another son, routed an Uzbek force outside of Balkh and captured the city, Kandahar was captured by the Mughals in 1638 too.

== Surrender of Ali Mardan ==
Ali Mardan khan, Soon surrendered the city of Kandahar to the Mughal garrison, This resulted in the Reconquest of Kandahar by the Mughals. The defection of Ali mardan khan enabled the Mughals to regain control of Kandahar which remained under their authority till the next Safavid siege.
