= Fall of Kandahar (1638) =

Coordinates: 31.602222°N 65.658889°E

- Part of the Mughal–Safavid War (1637–1638)
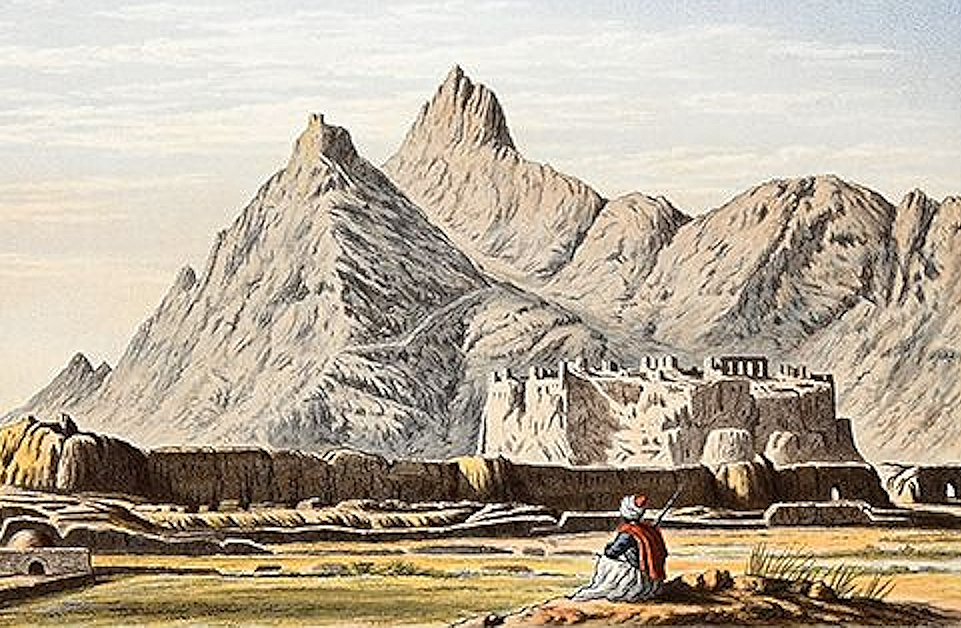
- View of the fortress of Old Kandahar
| Date | February–March 1638 |
| Location | Kandahar, modern day Afghanistan |
| Result | Mughal victory |
| Territorial changes | Kandahar falls to the Mughals |

Belligerents
| Safavid Iran | Mughal Empire |

Commanders and leaders
| Shah Safi; Alimardan Khan (surrendered); Siyavush Qullar-aqasi | Shah Jahan; Sa‘id Khan |

The Fall of Kandahar (1638) refers to the recovery of the Kandahar fortress by the Mughal Empire from the Safavids, following the betrayal of Alimardan Khan, Safavid Governor of the region. After the formal remittance of the fortress to the Mughals on March 11 without a fight, a battle ensued in the region of Kandahar on open ground between Mughal forces and Safavid forces about a month later on April 11, resulting in a Safavid defeat. The fall of Kandahar was part of the Mughal–Safavid War (1637–1638), giving control of Kandahar to the Mughals for a period of about 10 years, until the Safavids recaptured it in the Siege of Kandahar (1648–1649), never to return again in the possession of the Mughals. The Siege of Bost (1638) followed in the summer of the same year 1638, ending in an important Mughal victory.

== Context ==
Qandahar had been captured by Babur, the founder of the Mughal Empire, from Shah Beg Arghun, general previously in the service of the Timurid ruler Sultan Husayn Bayqara, in 1508.

In 1534–35, the Safavid Prince Sam Mirza was sent by Shah Tahmasp to besiege Kandahar, but it was defended during eight months by the Mughal castellan Khwaja Kalan Beg, until Humayun’s brother Mirza Kamran arrived with reinforcements and repulsed the Safavids.

In 1554 Humayun gave Kandahar to the Safavids in return for their help in his regaining of the throne. Despite requests from the Mughals, the Safavids kept the fortress until 1595, when the Safavid hereditary Governor of Kandahar Mirza Muzaffar Husain returned it to the Mughal and joined their side. The Safavids attempted to recapture the fortress in 1606 during the first year of the reign of Jahangir in the Siege of Kandahar (1605–1606) led by Husain Khan Shamlu, but failed. They again attacked in 1623, during the Mughal–Safavid war (1622–1623), and this time Kandahar fell to the Safavids. The region of Kandahar was put under the Safavid governorship of Ganj Ali Khan, and, when he died, his son Alimardan Khan became Governor.

== Bloodless surrender of Kandahar (March 11, 1638) ==
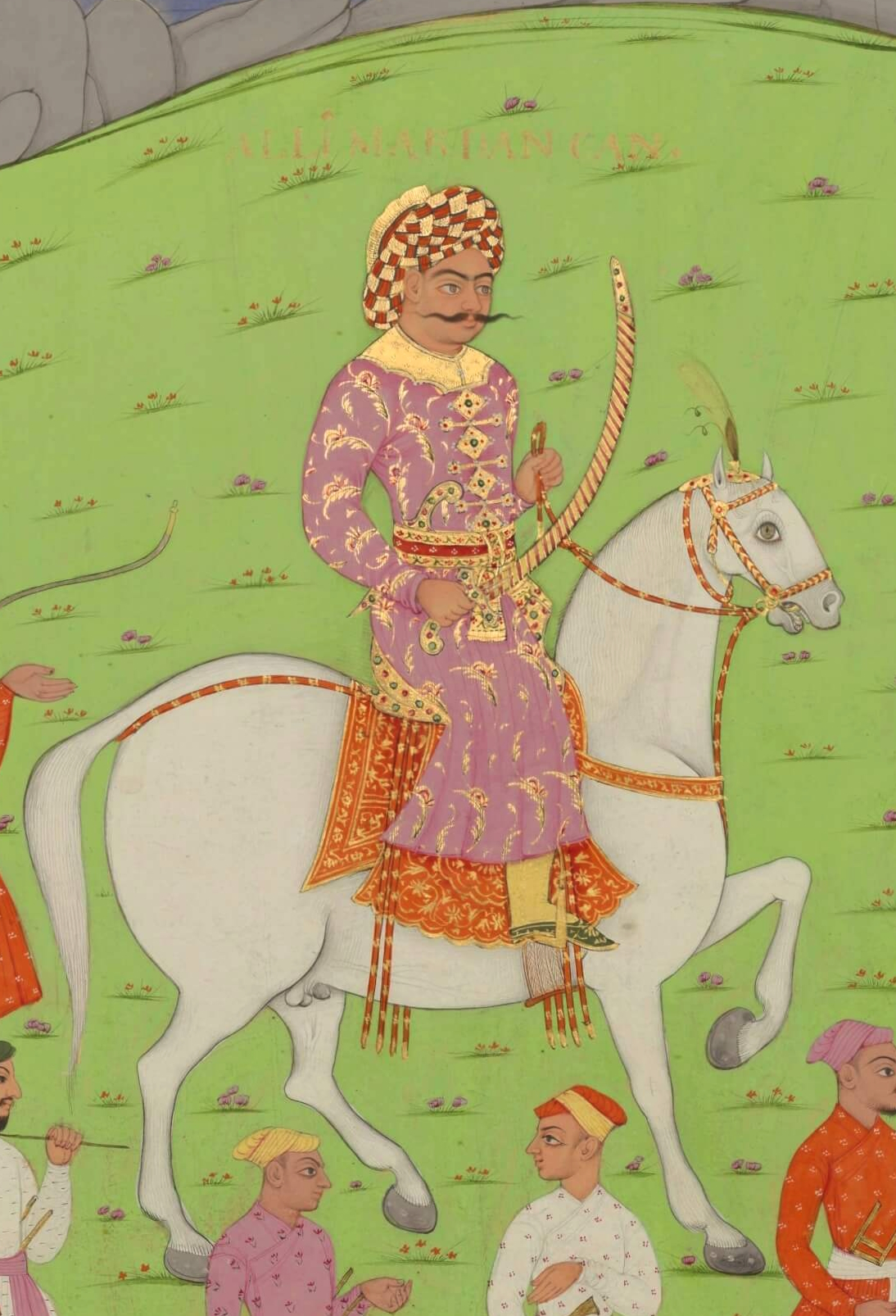
Alimardan Khan surrendered the fortress of Kandahar to the Mughals without a fight. Indian artist, for Niccolao Manucci, Storia do Mogor (c. 1680–1700).

Shah Jahan had long intended to capture the fortress of Kandahar from the Safavids.

Sa‘id Khan, the Mughal governor of Kabul, was ordered to prepare troops to conquer the Qandahar fortress in coordination with other Mughal troops. The plan was also to attempt to win over Alimardan Khan to the Mughal cause.

Instead, Alimardan Khan reinforced the defenses of Kandahar and the surrounding mountains, including the installations on Mount Laka, which overlooks the Qandahar fortress. He also asked the Safavid Shah Shah Safi to prepare troops in support of the fortress. But Shah Safi, weary of Alimardan Khan's ambitions, refused to provide military support and even threatened to kill Alimardan Khan and his family. Alimardan Khan then started to consider shifting to the Mughal side. Attempting to take control of the situation Shah Safi finally sent his general Siyavush Qullar-aqasi with troops, with the mission of inspecting the Kandahar fortress, then arrest or kill Alimardan Khan. Alimardan Khan summoned Siyavush to turn back with his troops, but Siyavush continued his advance, from Mashhad to Bust and to the village of Kushk-i-Nakhud. Siyavush managed to convince some of Alimardan Khan's Qizilbash troops to shift to his side.

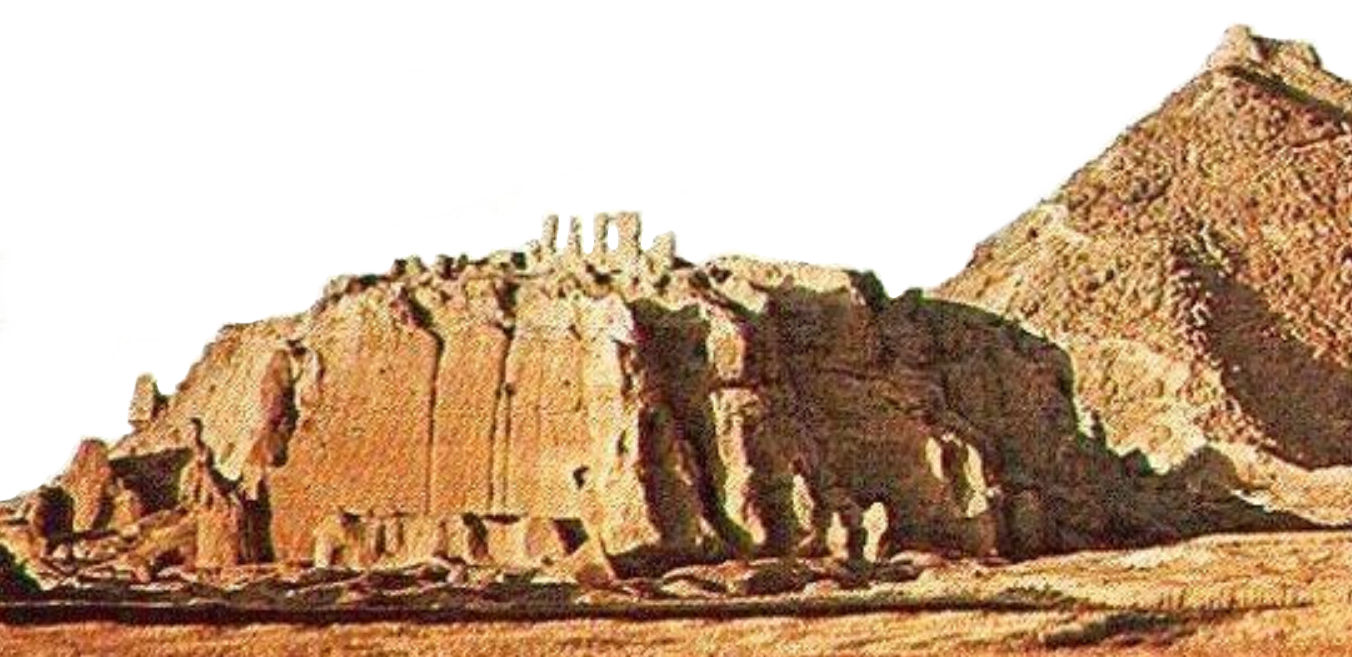
Ruins of the citadel of Old Kandahar in 2018

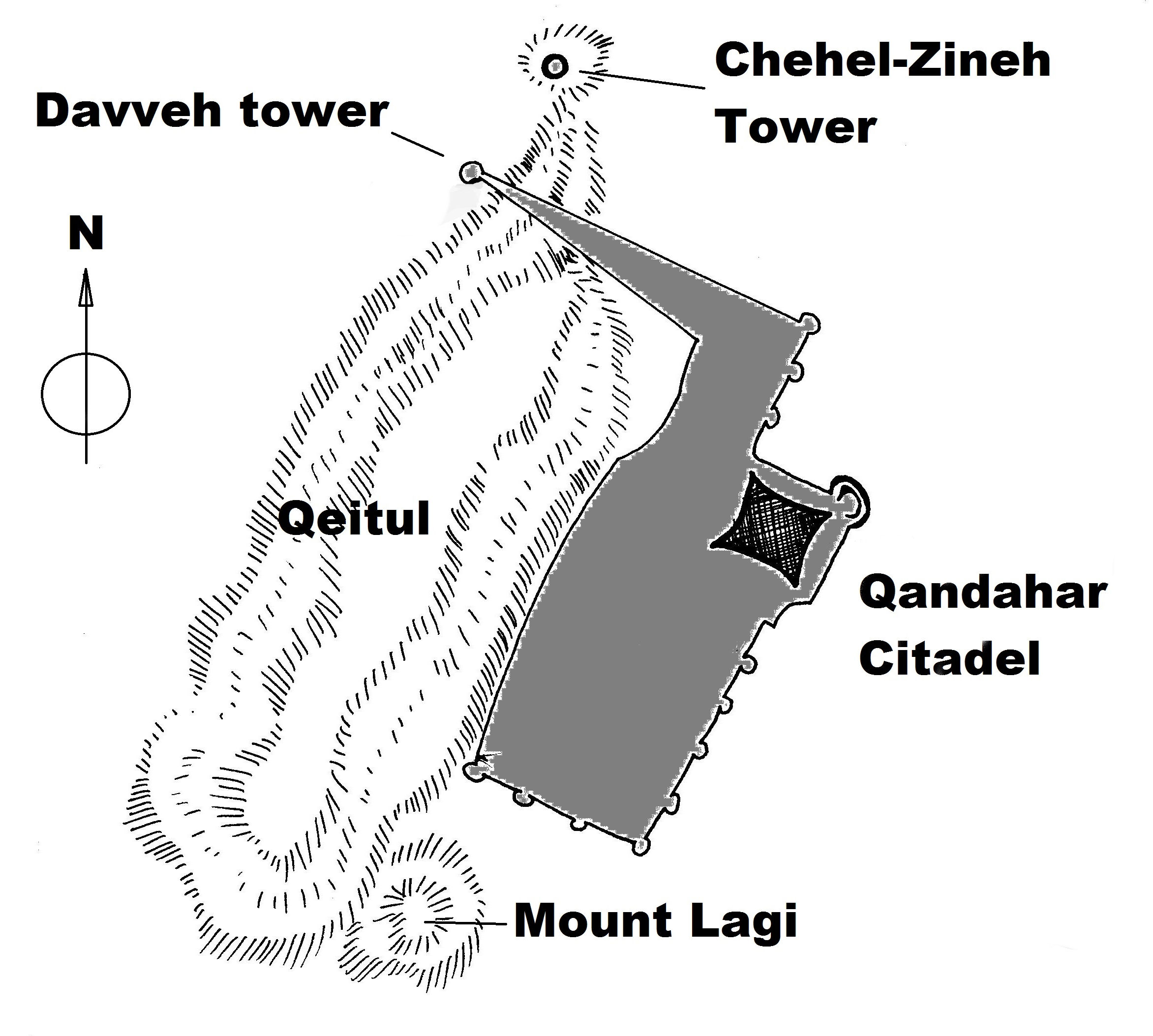
Plan of the citadel of Old Kandahar

Alimardan Khan sent messages to the Mughal commander Sa‘id Khan, in order to coordinate troops in defense against Siyavush, and surrender the fortress to the Mughals. The Mughal general Iwaz Khan moved from Ghazni with a thousand cavalrymen, and another thousand cavalrymen moved from Kabul on February 24, 1638. Alimardan Khan had the citadel of Moqor remitted to Iwaz Khan on March 1.

Iwaz Khan arrived with his Mughal troops in Kandahar on March 8, and he was welcomed into the fortress by Alimardan Khan. Sa‘id Khan's son Muh’d Shaikh, arrived in Qalat, some distance from Qandahar, and the fortress was also remitted to him by appointees of Alimardan Khan. In March 11, Alimardan Khan sent a formal petition for amnesty to the Mughal court, with an offer of service, announcing his intention to yield the Qandahar fortress to the Mughals. Muh’d Shaikh was welcomed in Kandahar with his troops on March 12. Sa‘id Khan then moved from Kabul with five thousand cavalrymen, heading to Kandahar.

== Field battle against the Safavids (April 11) ==
The Mughal court promoted Qilich Khan Turani, who had been the governor of Multan, to the post of Governor of Qandahar and defender of the fortress. More troops, from Multan, Bukkur and Seistan were ordered to reinforce Kandahar, in preparation of a confrontation with the Safavid troops of Siyavush Qullar-aqasi. Prince Shah Shuja was sent with an additional 20,000 cavalrymen. Alimardan Khan was rewarded with numerous presents. He was also appointed Amir al-umara and was later made governor of Kabul and Kashmir.

On April 2, Sa‘id Khan arrived at the outskirts of the Kandahar fortress and was welcomed by Alimardan Khan. He was ordered to ready himself to confront the Safavid troops of Siyavush in the open if they chose to move towards Kandahar, while Qilich Khan was stationed in the Kandahar fortress. Seeing the amount of preparations on the Mughal side, Shah Safi finally abandoned plans to send his own troops.

Sa‘id Khan decided to move against Siyavush. Two thousand cavalrymen were stationed to protect the fortress. 3,000 men were assigned to the direct confrontation with Siyavush, together with 8,000 cavalrymen, 400 riflemen and some of Alimardan Khan's troops. On April 11, they confronted Siyavush, who aligned 5,000 to 6,000 cavalrymen. The Mughals routed the Safavids and captured their camp. April 13 was a day of festivities around the Kandahar fortress:

Sa‘id Khan, enjoying victory and triumph, had the drums of rejoicing sounded and turned back. On the 28th of Dhu’l-Qa‘da [April 13] camp was made on the outskirts of Qandahar. The inhabitants, indeed all residents in the area, overjoyed by the defeat dealt by the warriors of the religion to the schismatic army, which had resulted in their freedom from the aggression of the oppressive Qizilbash, and mosques, in which litanies and zikrs had been nothing but curses on the Prophet’s companions, resounded with the good qualities of the Orthodox Caliphs and enumerations of the virtues of the just emperor.

— Padshahnama

== Later events: arrival of Qulij Khan, and Siege of Bost ==
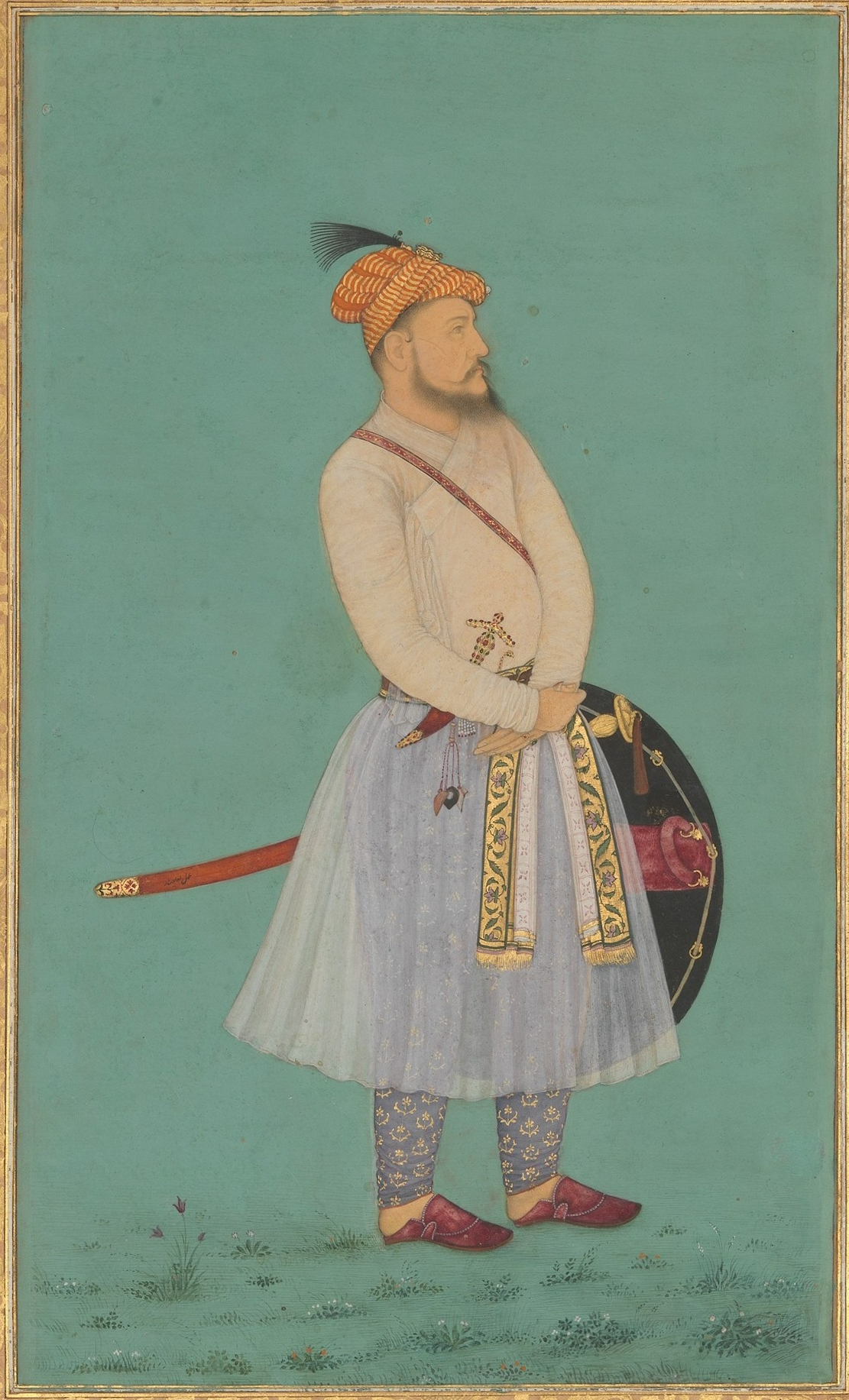
Qilich Khan Turani became the Mughal Governor of Kandahar for several years, following the 1638 capture of the city. Shah Jahan Album, painting by La'lchand. ca. 1640.

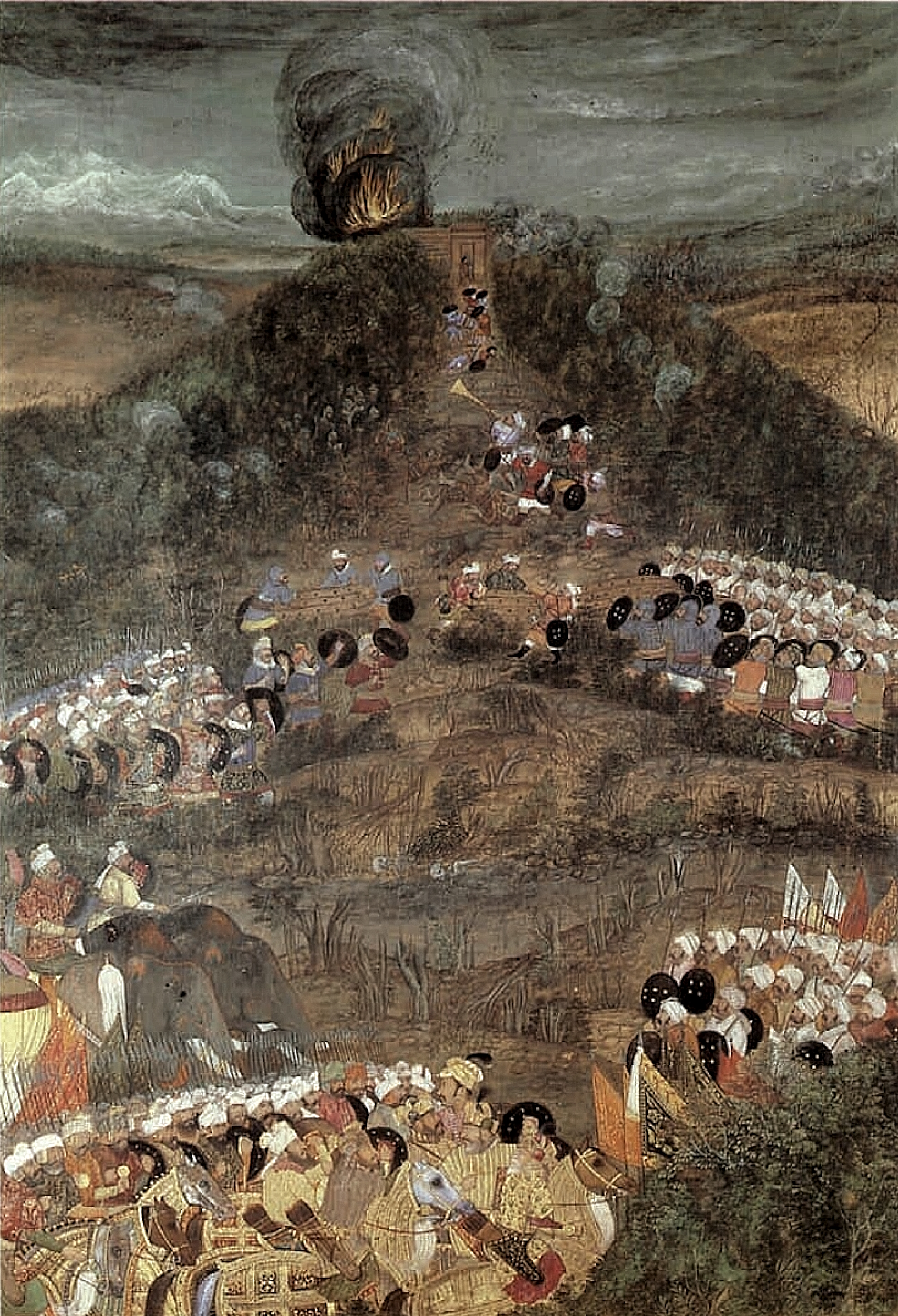
The failed Mughal Siege of Kandahar in 1649. Attributed to Payag. Mughal, mid-17th century. Padshahnama.

Sa‘id Khan (died 1651–52) received numerous presents from the emperor, and was entitled "Bahadur Zafar-Jang" ("The brave one who is victorious in battle"). Qulij Khan Turani, the governor of Multan, arrived in Kandahar with imperial decrees on May 3 in order to take possession of the fortress as imperial governor.

In the wake of the fall of Kandahar, various fortress would also fall in Mughal hands, such as Zamin Dawar and Girishk and Sarban Qil‘a, the main event being the Siege of Bost from July to September 1638, led by Qulij Khan Turani.

Kandahar remained under the control of the Mughals for about ten years, but Abbas II of Persia recaptured Kandahar in the Siege of Kandahar (1648–1649). The Mughal armies were unable to ever recapture it despite repeated sieges during the Mughal–Safavid War (1649–1653).

== Sources ==
- Thackston, Wheeler M. (2025). Padshahnama: A Chronicle of the Reign of Shahjahan (Volume 2: 1637–1647). Singapore: Springer. ISBN 978-981-96-5924-1.
