= Siege of Kandahar (1648–1649) =

- Part of the Mughal–Safavid war (1649–1653)
Date	28 December 1648 – 22 February 1649 (1 month, 3 weeks and 4 days)
Location	Kandahar, modern-day Afghanistan
Result	Safavid victory
Territorial changes	Kandahar falls to the Safavids

Belligerents
Safavid Iran	Mughal Empire

Commanders and leaders
Shah Abbas II; Mihrab Khan	Daulat Khan Mayi (surrendered)

Strength
40,000	7,000

Casualties and losses
2,000, including 600 Qizilbash	400

The siege of Kandahar, also known as the Kandahar campaign, was led by Shah Abbas II of Safavid Empire against the Mughal-held city of Kandahar, in modern-day Afghanistan. It lasted from 28 December 1648 to 22 February 1649, and ended in the permanent loss of Kandahar by the Mughals.

== Background ==
Kandahar had been under Mughal control since its capture in 1638, when the Safavid commander Ali Mardan Khan handed it over to the Mughals. The Safavids did not make a move over the city until 1648, when the Mughals were engaged in the campaigns in Balkh and Badakhshan, which proved to be disastrous. In the summer of 1648 Shah Abbas II led an army numbering 40,000 and after taking the city of Bost besieged Kandahar.

== Siege ==
The 7000-men strong Mughal garrison under Daulat Khan fortified their positions but made the fatal mistake of not safeguarding the two watchtowers on the top of a nearby hill from which guns could be fired into the fort. Persians at once seized them and opened fire into the fort's interior. Due to winter, the Mughal garrison did not expect any reinforcement to arrive before spring. A portion of army under two Tartar chiefs who had entered the Mughal service after the end of the Balkh war, mutinied and opened negotiations with the Persians. Daulat Khan failed to maintain discipline within the troops and consequently surrendered the fort to the Persians on 22 February 1649, on the promise of safe passage to India.

== Aftermath ==
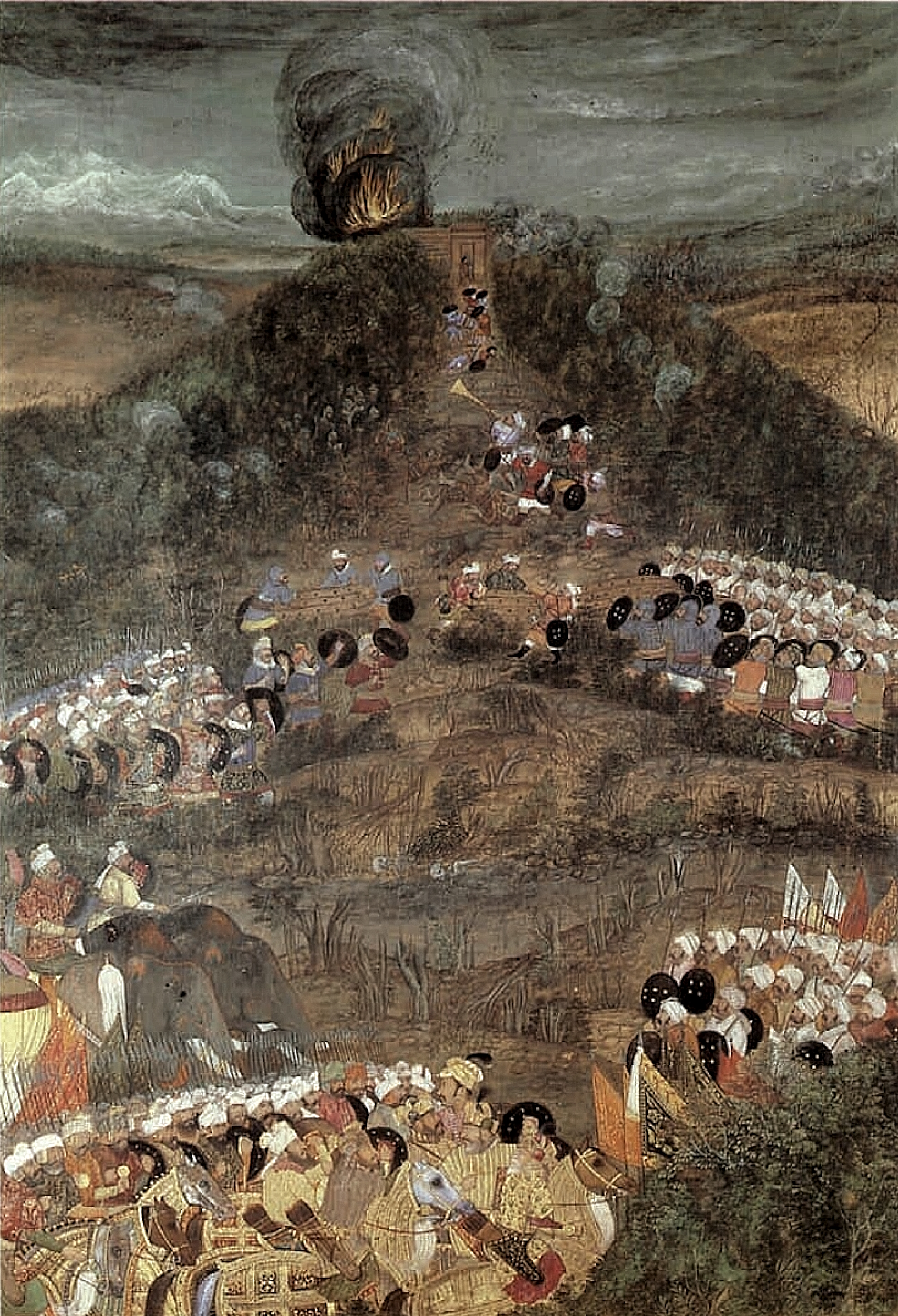
The failed Mughal siege of Kandahar in 1649. Attributed to Payag. Mughal, mid-17th century. Padshahnama. Opaque watercolor on paper. The Knellington Collection, Courtesy Harvard University Art Museums, Cambridge, Massachusetts.

Shah Abbas II appointed Mihrab Khan as the governor, and returned to Isfahan. The siege cost Safavids 2000 men including 600 Qizilbash while Mughals suffered 400 casualties. Subsequently the Mughals besieged Kandahar thrice between 1649 and 1653, but failed to re-capture it, making the loss of Kandahar permanent.

== Sources ==
- Roy, Kaushik (2014). Military Transition in Early Modern Asia, 1400–1750: Cavalry, Guns, Government and Ships. Bloomsbury Publishing. ISBN 978-1-78093-813-4.
- Matthee, Rudi; Mashita, Hiroyuki (2010). "KANDAHAR iv. From The Mongol Invasion Through the Safavid Era". In Yarshater, Ehsan (ed.). Encyclopædia Iranica. Vol. XV/5: Ḵamsa of Jamāli–Karim Devona. London and New York: Routledge & Kegan Paul. pp. 478–484. ISBN 978-1-934283-28-8.
- Sarkar, Sir Jadunath (1912). "First siege of Qandahar". History of Aurangzib: Reign of Shah Jehan. M.C. Sarkar & sons. OCLC 5733274.
