= Siege of Bost (1638) =

Coordinates: 31.565961°N 64.350822°E

- Part of the Mughal–Safavid War (1637–1638)
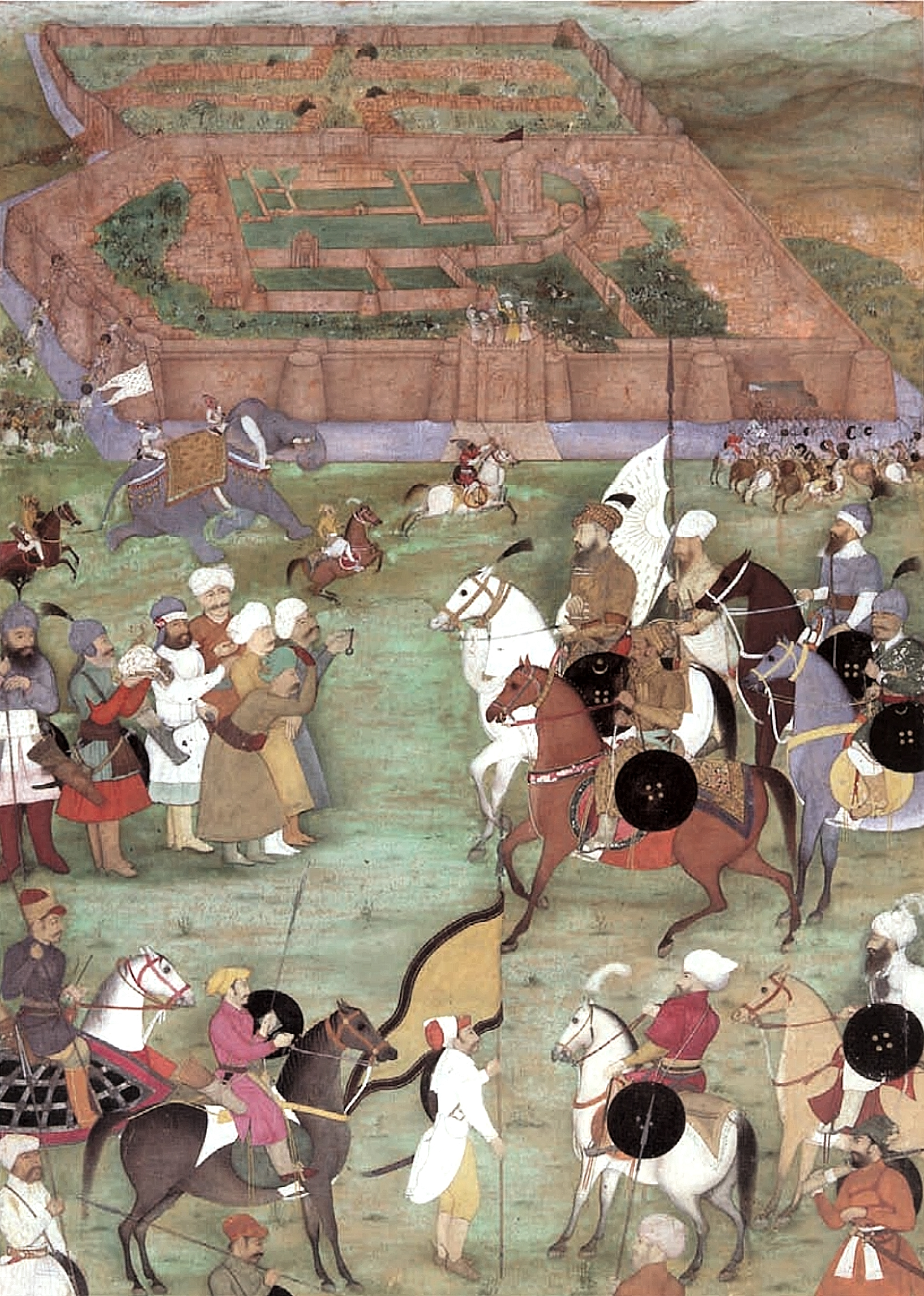
- Surrender of the Safavids under Mihrab Khan to the Mughal general Qulij Khan Turani at the Siege of Bost (1638). Padshahnama (c.1640). Musée Guimet (MA 3318)
Date	July–September 1638
Location	Bost (modern Lashkari Bazar)
Result	Mughal victory
Territorial changes	Bost falls to the Mughals

Belligerents
Safavid Iran	Mughal Empire

Commanders and leaders
Shah Safi; Mihrab Khan (surrendered)	Shah Jahan; Qulij Khan Turani

Strength
	12,000

Casualties and losses
	100 †, 300 (WIA)

The Siege of Bost, from July 28 to September 3, 1638, was a siege of the fortress of Bost (modern Lashkari Bazar) led by the Mughal Empire general Qulij Khan Turani sent by Shah Jahan, against the Safavids under Mihrab Khan, an Armenian ghulam of the ruler of Iran Safi of Persia. The siege was part of the Mughal–Safavid War (1637–1638), and followed the Fall of Kandahar in March 1638.

== The siege ==
Qulij Khan Turani, the governor of Multan, had only arrived in Kandahar with imperial decrees on May 3, several months after the Fall of Kandahar, in order to take possession of the fortress as imperial governor. He then campaigned to capture several smaller Safavid fortresses in the area.

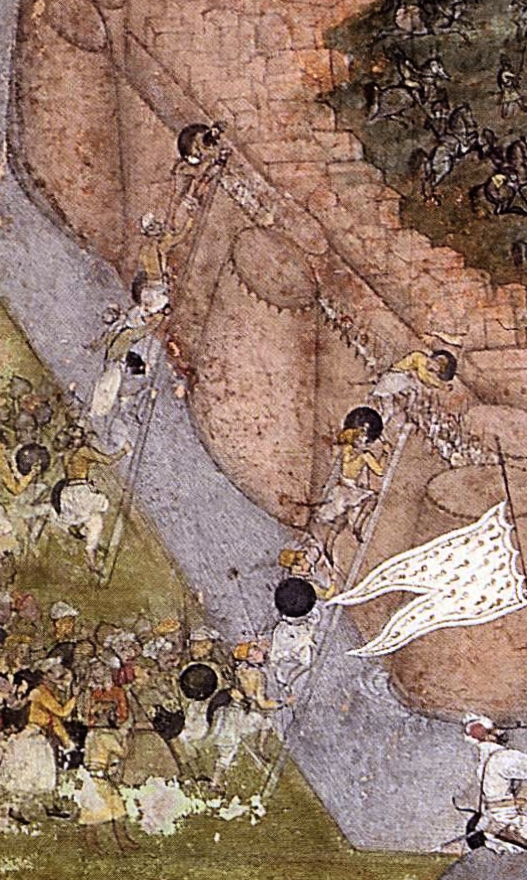
Mughal troops scaling the walls of Bost

The Padshahnama (1646) relates in detail the events of the siege of Bost and also provides a detailed miniature illustration. Qulij Khan Turani arrived at the fortress of Bost on July 26, 1638, and started to establish troops around it. He led a force of about 12,000 troops. Tunnels and trenches were dug out, attempting to mine the foundations of the walls. Meanwhile, the defenders fired at the attackers. Finally two tunnels were run under the walls and consolidated, and then packed with gunpowder. On August 18, the explosives were lit, and their explosions opened a proper way into the fortress. The attackers, properly armored, ran into the fortress. The rest of the Mughal attackers used ladders to climb the walls. Many of the enemies were killed, but the Mughals also lost about a hundred men in the offensive, with an additional three hundred wounded. The Safavids fled towards the central citadel while the Mughals took positions on the outers walls. Mihrab Khan was also entrenched in the citadel, with little water resources. New tunnels were dug towards the citadel, and their explosives were lit on September 2. The towers of the central fortress were blown up, and tunnels were soon dug under the central citadel itself.

Seeing no possible exit, Mihrab Khan sued for amnesty. He turned over the citadel to the Mughals on September 3, and surrendered to Qulij Khan Turani. Qulij Khan Turani hosted Mihrab Khan and his followers for one day, none of those who surrendered were killed, and he gave them robes. Finally, he returned them to Persia as they had requested.

The scene of the battle appears in a 1646 Mughal painting from the Padshahnama, in which the various stages of the siege can be seen, including the breaching of the outer walls with mines, the Mughals climbing the walls and invading the inner fortress, and the surrender of Mihrab Khan.

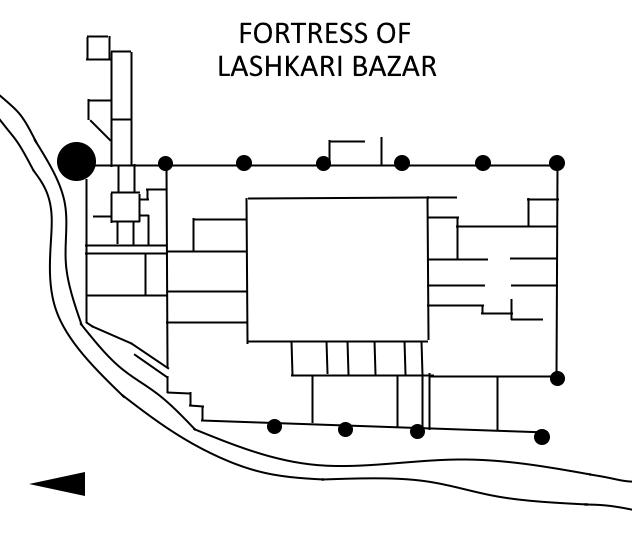
Plan of the fortress of Lashkari Bazar in the 20th century,

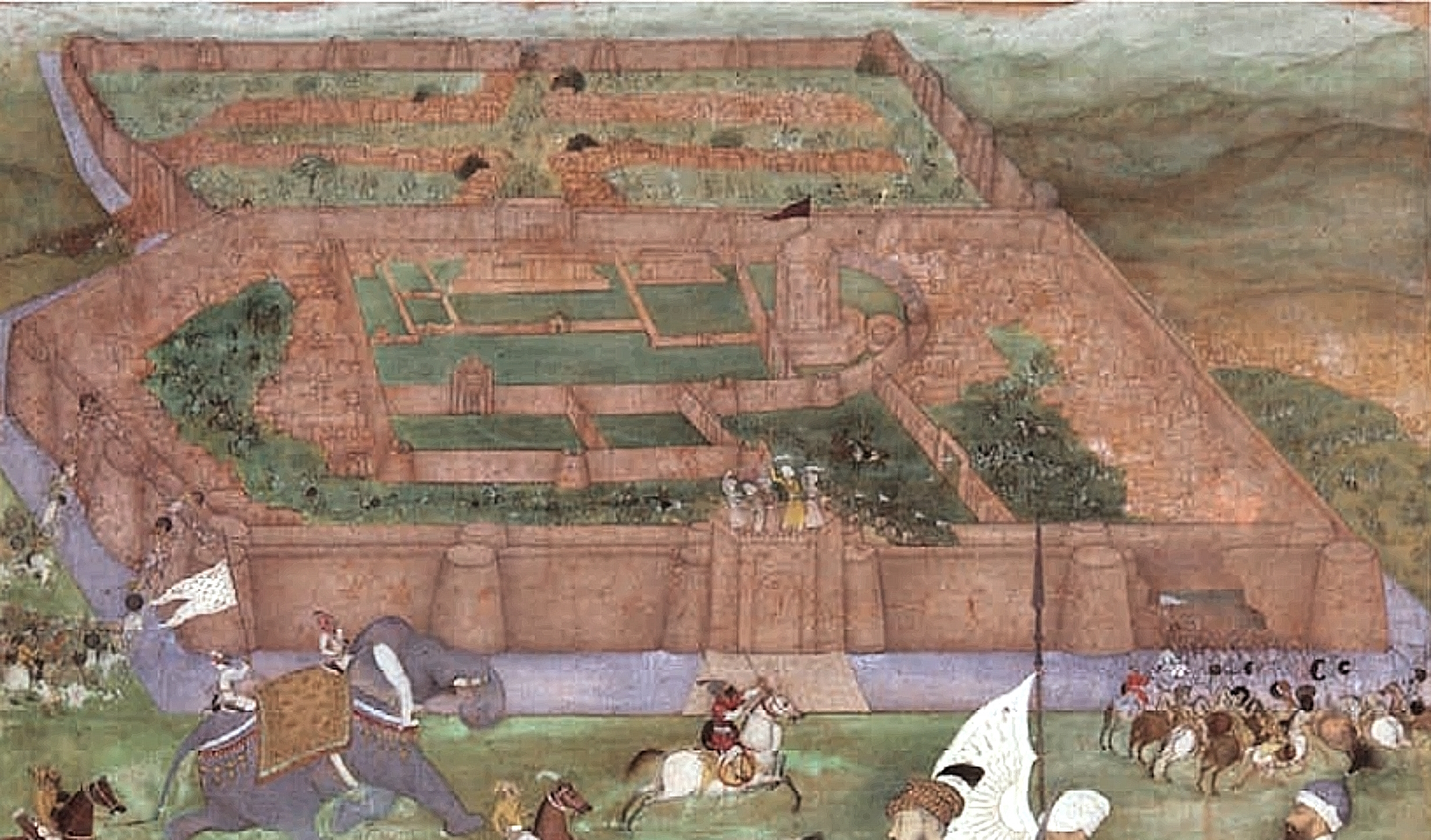
Likely view of the Lashkari Bazar fortress (Bost) circa 1646.

== Aftermath ==
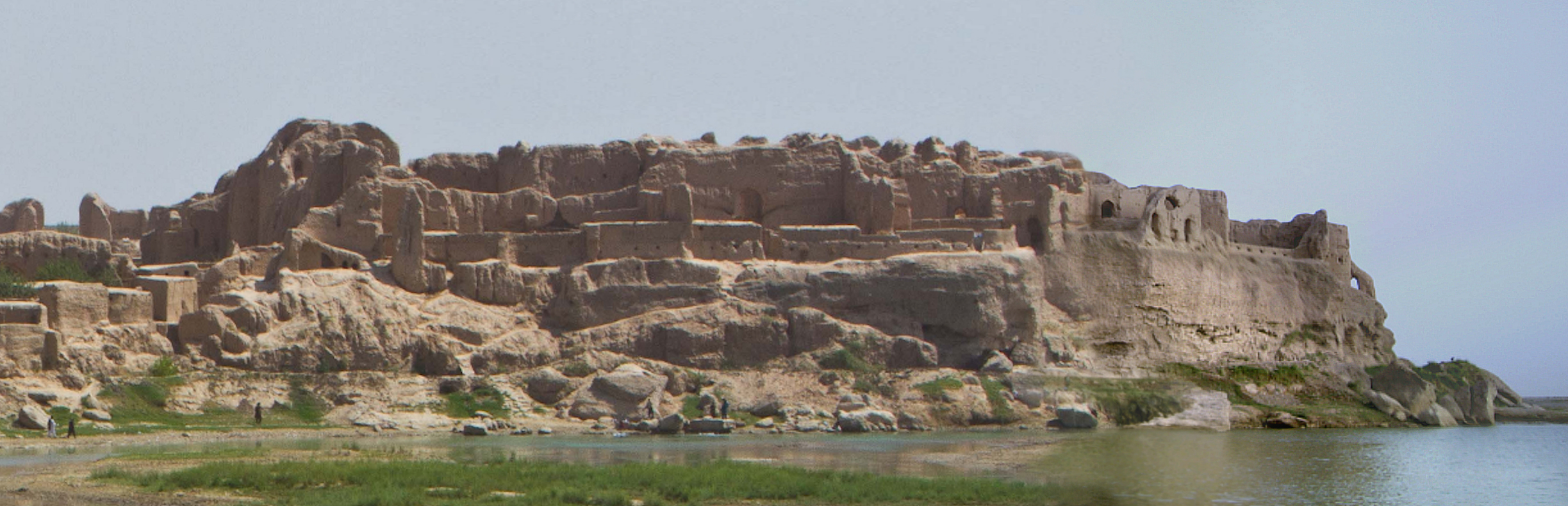
Ruins of the fortress of Lashkari Bazar today, in Lashkargah (the South Palace, seen from the north).

Bost would be recaptured by the Safavids after about 10 years, in the summer of 1648, as Shah Abbas II led an army numbering 40,000 against the Mughals. The Mughals had been weakened by their disastrous campaigns in Balkh and Badakhshan.

Kandahar was also recaptured by the Safavids in the same campaign, in the Siege of Kandahar (1648–1649). The Mughal armies were unable to ever recapture these fortresses, despite repeated sieges during the Mughal–Safavid War (1649–1653).

== Sources ==
- Matthee, Rudi; Mashita, Hiroyuki (2010). "KANDAHAR iv. From The Mongol Invasion Through the Safavid Era". In Yarshater, Ehsan (ed.). Encyclopædia Iranica. Vol. XV/5: Ḵamsa of Jamāli–Karim Devona. London and New York: Routledge & Kegan Paul. pp. 478–484. ISBN 978-1-934283-28-8.
- Thackston, Wheeler M. (2025). Padshahnama: A Chronicle of the Reign of Shahjahan (Volume 2: 1637–1647). Singapore: Springer. ISBN 978-981-96-5924-1.
