= Mughal–Safavid war =

Mughal–Safavid war may refer to these wars between the Mughal Empire and Safavid Iran:

- Mughal–Safavid war (1622–1623)
- Mughal–Safavid War (1637–1638)
- Mughal–Safavid war (1649–1653)

== See also ==
- Mughal (disambiguation)
- Safavi (disambiguation)
