= Siege of Kandahar (1605–1606) =

Battle of 1605–1606 between Safavid and Mughal

- Part of Mughal-Safavid Wars
| Date | November 1605 – January 1606 |
| Location | Kandahar |
| Result | Mughal victory |
| Territorial changes | Kandahar remains in the Mughal Empire |

Belligerents
| Safavid Empire | Mughal Empire |

Commanders and leaders
| Abbas the Great; Husain Khan Shamlu | Jahangir; Šāh Beg Khan |

The siege of Kandahar lasted from November 1605 to January 1606 and was led by the Persians to capture the Mughal frontier city of Kandahar. After two months of constant assaults, the relief army forced the Persians to retreat. Thus, resulted in a decisive victory for the Mughal Empire.

== Background ==
The Mughals had obtained the city of Kandahar in 1595, after the Mughal army advanced to the city's governor, Moẓaffar-Ḥosayn Mirzā, and negotiated with him a surrender. The Safavid ruler, Shah Abbas, was shocked by the loss of the important fortress but as main Iranian concerns lay with the equally powerful Ottomans at their westernmost territories, he abstained from military action, preferring to negotiate a settlement.

== Battle ==
When Emperor Akbar died on October 27, 1605, the Safavid governor of Herat, Hosayn Khan, moved to recapture the city on behalf of the Safavids by the order of Shah Abbas while the Indians were distracted with other matters. The city, defended by governor Šāh Beg Khan, held out against the Safavid siege until the next year when the new emperor, Jahangir, sent an army that lifted the siege.

== Aftermath ==
Kandahar was surrendered to the Mughals. Abbas repudiated Hosayn's actions in a letter to Jahangir, and both sides reestablished normal relations, though Kandahar would remain a controversial affair between both parties.

== Sources ==
- "KANDAHAR iv. From The Mongol Invasion Through the Safavid Era". Encyclopædia Iranica.
