= Juriaen Ambdis =

Dutch painter (17th Century)

Juriaen Ambdis was a 17th-century Dutch ship's gunner and painter. In 1648 he took service as gunner in the army of Safavid King (Shah) Abbas II (r. 1642-1666). He participated in the successful Siege of Kandahar during the Mughal–Safavid war (1649–53). After the siege, Ambdis and all other Dutchmen were discharged from service. However, unlike his fellow kinsmen, Ambdis decided to stay in Safavid Iran, reportedly eager to work as an artist. His decision was inspired by the extremely high salaries paid by the Safavids to Hendrick Boudewijn van Lockhorst, another Dutch painter. However, unlike Van Lockhorst, Ambdis was unsuccessful in making a name for himself, and almost fell into beggary. On 29 March 1649, an Iranian merchant had spotted Ambdis walking alone behind a caravan in Ottoman-held Iraq, and had given him bread. On 22 May 1650, it was reported that Ambdis had converted to Islam in Baghdad. Ambdis subsequently disappears from historic records; he died sometime after 1650.

== Sources ==
- Floor, Willem (1996). "DUTCH-PERSIAN RELATIONS". Encyclopaedia Iranica, Vol. VII, Fasc. 6. pp. 603–613.
- Schwartz, Gary (2014). "Terms of Reception: Europeans and Persians in Each Other's Art". In North, Michael; Da Costa Kaufmann, Thomas (eds.). Mediating Netherlandish art and material culture in Asia. Amsterdam University Press. ISBN 978-9089645692.
