= Mughal–Safavid war (1649–1653) =

Conflict within present-day Afghanistan

- Part of Mughal–Persian Wars
Date	28 December 1648 – 29 September 1653 (4 years, 9 months and 1 day)
Location	Afghanistan
Result	Safavid victory
Territorial changes	Kandahar falls again to the Safavids

Belligerents
Safavid Empire; Khanate of Bukhara	Mughal Empire: Jaipur State

Commanders and leaders
Abbas II; Mehrāb Khan; Autar Khan; Muhammad Khan	Shah Jahan; Saadullah Khan; Jai Singh I Aurangzeb; Murad Baksh; Dara Shikoh; Daulat Khan Mayi

The Mughal–Safavid war of 1649–1653 was fought between the Mughal and Safavid empires in the territory of modern Afghanistan. While the Mughals were at war with the Janid Uzbeks, the Safavid army captured the fortress city of Kandahar and other strategic cities that controlled the region. The Mughals attempted to regain the city, but their efforts were proven unsuccessful.

== Background ==
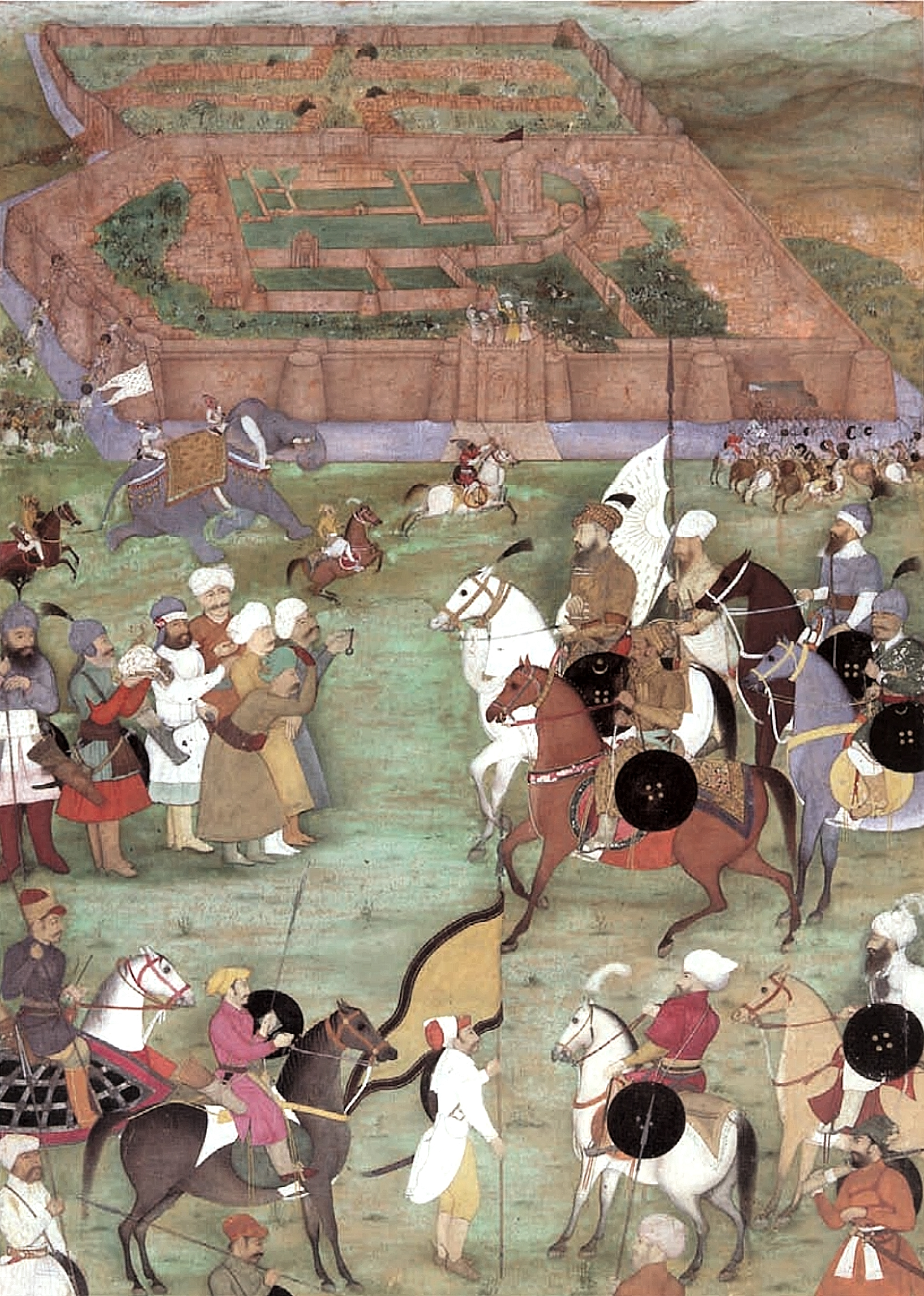
Surrender of the Safavids under Mihrab Khan to the Mughal general Qulij Khan Turani at the Siege of Bost (1638).

The Safavids had territorial claims over Kandahar since the reign of Shah Tahmasp. Humayun, the exiled Mughal Emperor, is known to have gained the support of Shah Tahmasp, in return for his permission to allow the Safavids to capture Kandahar. Subsequently, conflicts emerged in the region during the reign of fourth Mughal emperor, Jahangir.

In 1638, Shah Jahan, assisted by Kamran Khan and Malik Maghdood, had marched on Kandahar and negotiated the surrender from the Persian commander, Ali Mardan Khan. He expected the Persians to attempt to regain the city soon and so he ordered that the wall be repaired rapidly while a large Mughal army based in Kabul protected the area. Since 1638, when the Kurdish turncoat Ali Mardan Khan handed Kandahar over to Shah Jahan, Kandahar was under the Mughal control. It was considered vital for the Mughals that the twin 'gateway-cities' to Hindustan, i.e. Kabul and Kandahar, be remained under Mughal rule, for two primary reasons. Firstly, the Mughal Empire in India was often viewed by them as a painfully small compensation for the loss of their ancient capital – Samarkand – which they had been driven out of by the Uzbeks. Beyond the internal administrative agendas, the Mughals always kept it a priority to expand the western frontier of the empire in the sentiment of reconquista. Secondly, Central Asian trade provided the Mughals with warhorses, without which not only the military forces would be incapacitated, but could also potentially spark tribal revolts and foreign invasions. Kandahar in particular was at the crossroads of a number of major commercial trade routes in Central Asia. The two cities were thus the subject of deep strategic concern.

In 1646, when no Persian attack came, the Emperor sent his son, Murad Baksh, to invade Uzbek-controlled Badakhshan. In the following year, Aurangzeb, another son, routed an Uzbek force outside of Balkh and captured the city. Though victorious in the field, the Mughals were unable to secure the conquered territories and Shah Jahan was forced to recall his armies from Badakhshan. In February 1646, Shah Jahan dispatched an army of 60,000 to Kabul, and thence to Badakshan and Balkh, with his son Murad Baksh as the commander-in-chief. This was done in support of Nazr Muhammad and his son, Abd al-Aziz, against the Toqai-Timurid ruler of Balkh. However, Nazr Muhammad and Abd al-Aziz betrayed the Mughals after the end of the campaign, and fled to Isfahan. The subsequent Balkh campaign in 1647 against them was led by Aurangzeb, and cost the Mughal empire 20 million rupees along with the recently acquired Balkh and Badakshan.

== War ==
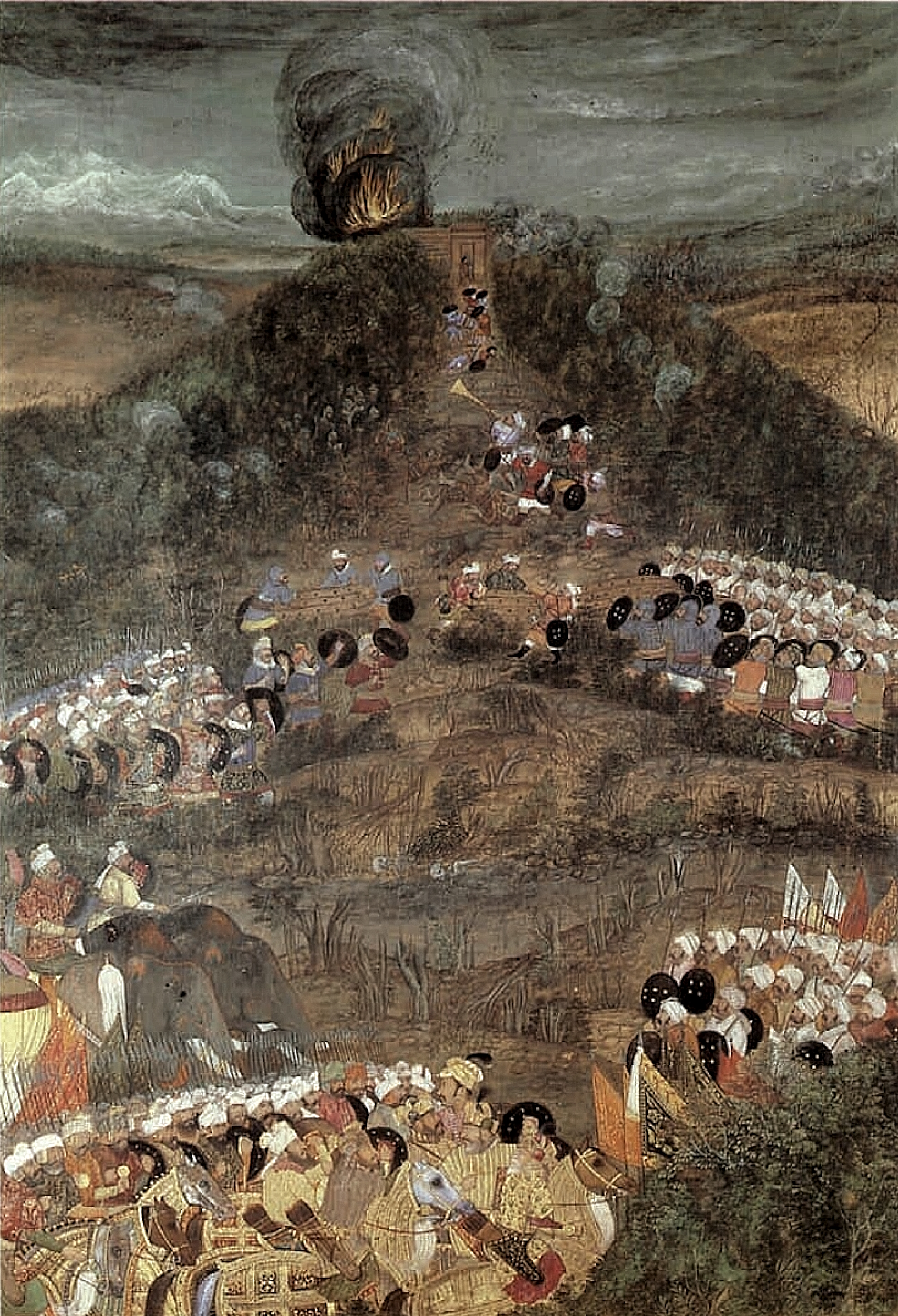
The failed Mughal Siege of Kandahar in 1649. Attributed to Payag. Mughal, mid-17th century. Padshahnama. Opaque watercolor on paper. The Knellington Collection, Courtesy Harvard University Art Museums, Cambridge, Massachusetts.

On 4 April 1648, encouraged by the Mughal reversal in Badakhshan, Shah Abbas II marched from Isfahan with an army of 40,000. After capturing Bost, he laid siege to Kandahar on 28 December and easily captured it after a brief siege on 22 February 1649, mainly owing to the failure of the Mughal commander Daulat Khan Mayi to maintain discipline within the troops under his command. The disaster of the Balkh campaign had gravely weakened the Mughals' position on the frontier. The short duration of the Kandahar siege – two months – stands testament to the vulnerability of the Mughals in Afghanistan. The Mughals attempted to retake the city in 1651 but the arrival of winter forced them to suspend the siege.

=== Sieges of Kandahar ===
Shah Jahan sent Aurangzeb and the vizier Sa'dullah Khan with 50,000 soldiers, composed of the Barha Sayyids, the feudal Rajput levies and the local Afghans, to recapture it, but although he defeated the Safavids outside the city he was unable to take it. His artillery train proved unable for the task. Aurangzeb attempted to take the fortress city again in 1652. Abdul Aziz, Khan of Bukhara, had entered into an alliance with Shah Abbas and in May 1652, he dispatched 10,000 troops to Kabul in May to harass the Mughal supply lines. Though not strong enough to lift the siege, the Uzbeks endangered a Mughal convoy of 2,000 who were escorting one and a half million silver coins to the besieger's army at Kandahar. After two months of fighting Persian resistance and the growing activities of the Uzbeks, Aurangzeb was forced to abandon the campaign.

In 1653 Shah Jahan sent Dara Shikoh, with a large army and two of the heaviest artillery pieces of the empire, but after a five-month siege the Mughals couldn't manage to starve the city, and the attempt to breach their walls by cannon fire also failed. On 29 September 1653, Mughals finally gave up all attempts to recover Kandahar.

== Role of environment and climate ==
The tribes of the region of the Hindu Kush were often rebellious and had to be constantly pacified, disciplined, or eliminated. Their raids of Mughal supply lines and advance parties were disastrous for the army. At times these groups of fighters were independent, and at other times, they worked in coordination with the Uzbeks. Acquiring cash for the army was intensely difficult due to the differences in the monetary infrastructures between Mughal India and Afghanistan, hence the army was forced to lug bullion and cash across the steep passes and narrow defiles of the Hindu Kush mountains.

Further, the terrain and climate of the Hindu Kush and beyond is infamously debilitating. Neither raiding areas nor acquiring land revenue from the conquered areas was by any means extravagantly rewarding to the soldiers, due to the moderate agricultural production of the area. There was no equivalent of the Indian local grain-carriers, the Banjaras. There was also very little scope for foraging with the constant raids from Uzbek troops and resident tribal groups. The ferocity of the Afghan winter further added to these woes. Winter months meant a severe severance of transport across the Hindu Kush, something which was instrumental in the failure of several Mughal campaigns against the Safavids in Central Asia.

== See also ==
- Juriaen Ambdis
- Mughal-Safavid War (1622–1623)
- Foreign relations of the Mughal Empire

== Sources ==
- Burton, Audrey (1997). The Bukharans:a dynastic, diplomatic, and commercial history, 1550–1702. Palgrave Macmillan. ISBN 9780312173876.
- Chandra, Satish (2005). Medieval India: from Sultanat to the Mughals. Vol. II. Har-Anand Publications. ISBN 9788124110669.
- Kohn, George C. (2007). Dictionary of wars. Infobase Publishing. ISBN 9780816065776.
- "KANDAHAR iv. From The Mongol Invasion Through the Safavid Era". Encyclopædia Iranica.
- The Cambridge History of Iran, Volume 6. Cambridge University Press. 1986. ISBN 978-0-521-20094-3.
- "Mughal Warfare: Indian Frontiers and Highroads to Empire, 1500-1700, by Jos Gommans" (PDF).
- Kinra, Rajeev (2015). "King of Delhi, King of the World: Chandar Bhan's Perspective on Shah Jahan, the Mughal Court, and the Realm". Writing Self, Writing Empire: Chandar Bhan Brahman and the Cultural World of the Indo-Persian State Secretary. University of California Press. pp. 95–158. JSTOR 10.1525/j.ctt1ffjn5h.7.
- van Leeuwen, Richard (2017). "Gods, Demons, and Kings". Narratives of Kingship in Eurasian Empires, 1300-1800. Brill. pp. 52–77. JSTOR 10.1163/j.ctt1w8h2gc.7.
