= List of rulers of Multan =

Multan is a city in the Punjab region in present-day Pakistan. During the medieval period, the region of the city was once part of an emirate; it came under the control of the Delhi Sultanate in the 13th century; later, it rose as the center of the Langah Sultanate. It was given the status of a subah (province) under the Mughal Empire in the 16th century and through sieges in the 18th and 19th centuries, it came under the rule of the Afghans, the Sikhs and finally the British. This list contains the rulers who reigned over the region from this period to the pre-colonial British period.

== Emirate of Multan ==
- Sheikh Hamid (985–997)
- Fateh Daud (997–1010)

== Ghaznavid Empire ==
- Ahmad Niyaltigin (?–1034)

== Ghurid Empire ==
- Ali Karmakh (1175–1186)
- Amir Dad Hasan (1186–1203)
- Nasir ad-Din Qabacha (1203–1228)

== Delhi Sultanate ==
- Ikhtiyaruddin Qaraqash Khan Aitekin (1228–?)
- Izzudin Khan Ayaz (1236–?)
- Kabir Khan Ayaz (1240–1241)
- Tajuddin Abu Bakr Ayaz (1241–1245)
- Izzuddin Balban Kishlu Khan (1245–1249)
- Nusrat-al-Din Sher Khan Sungar (1249–1254)
- Izzuddin Balban Kishlu Khan (1254–1269)
- Muhammad bin Balban (1269–1285)
- Kay Khusrou bin Balban (1285–1287)
- Malik Jalal-ud-Din Firoz (1288–1292)
- Arkali Khan bin Jalal-ud-Din Khalji (1292–1296)
- Zafar Khan (1296–1299)
- Tajul Mulk Kafuri (1299–1304)
- Ghazi Malik (1304–1320; prior to becoming Sultan of Delhi)
- Kishlu Khan (1320–1327)
- Qiwam-al-Mulk Maqbul (1327–1341)
- Imad-ul-Mulk Sartez (?–1351)
- Ayn al-Mulk Mahru (1352–1362)
- Tatar Khan (1362–1376)
- Mardan Daulat Nasir-ul-Mulk (1376–?)
- Khizr Khan (1389–1414; prior to becoming Sultan of Delhi)
- Malik Abdur Rahim (1414–1423)
- Imad-ul-Mulk Mahmud Hasan (1423–1433)
- Shaikh Yusuf Qureshi (1438–1445)

== Langah Sultanate ==
- Rai Sahra Langah (1445–1469)
- Husseyn Langah (1469–1502)
- Feroz Khan Langah (1499 – 29 August 1502)
- Husseyn Langah (1499 – 29 August 1502)
- Husseyn Langah II (1525 – 1527)
- Lashkar Khan Langah (1527 – 1530)

== Sur Empire ==
- Haibat Khan Niazi (1541–1545)

== Mughal Empire ==
- Kamran Mirza (1526–1537)
- Muhammad Quli Barlas (1555–1571)
- Muhib Ali (1571–?)
- Said Khan Chugtai (?–1585)

The following is a list of notable governors of Multan Subah appointed by the central Mughal government.

- Syed Hamid Bukhari (c. 1585–1587)
- Sadiq Khan (c. 1587–1590)
- Muhib Ali Khan (c. 1590–1594)
- Rustam Mirza (c. 1594–1602)
- Said Khan (c. 1602–1605)
- Mirza Ghazi Beg (c. 1605–1606)
- Tashi Beg (c. 1606–1611)
- Abdul Nabi Uzbek (1611–1613)
- Baqir Khan Najam Sani (1613–1620)
- Khan Jahan Lodi (1620–1624)
- Asaf Khan (c. 1624–1631)
- Qulij Khan Turrani (1631–1638)
- Yusuf Khan (1638–1639)
- Najabat Khan (1639–1641)
- Qulij Khan Turrani (1641–1642)
- Said Khan Bahadur (1642–1643)
- Murad Baksh (1643–1646)
- Said Khan Bahadur (1646–1647)
- Bahadur Khan Rohela (1647–1649)
- Aurangzeb (1649–1653)
- Dara Shikoh (1653–1657)
- Lashkar Khan (1658)
- Tarbiat Khan (1658–1667)
- Saif Khan (1667–1668)
- Tahir Khan (1668–1669)
- Lashkar Khan (1669–1671)
- Mubariz Khan (1671–1672)
- Khwaja Abid Khan (1672–1674)
- Diler Khan (1674–1676)
- Muhammad Azam Shah (1676–1678)
- Muhammad Akbar (1678–1687)
- Mir Ashiq (1687–1695)
- Allahyar Khan (1695–1696)
- Abdus Samad Khan (1726–1737)
- Zakariya Khan (1737–1745)
- Shah Nawaz Khan (1745–1747)
- Zahid Khan (1747–1748)
- Kaura Mal (1748–1751)

== Durrani Empire ==
- Ali Mohammad Khakwani (1752–1767)
- Shuja Khan (1767–1772)
- Muzaffar Khan Sadozai (1780–1818)

== Bhangi Misl ==
- Diwan Singh Chachowalia (1772–1780)

== Sikh Empire ==
- Sawan Mal Chopra (1820–1844)
- Mulraj Chopra (1844–1849)
