= Safavi =

Safavī (Persian: صفوی 'related to Safī') may refer to:

- Safavi (surname), a Persian surname, best known as the surname of the royal family of the Safavid dynasty
- Safavid order, a Sufi order founded by Safi-ad-din Ardabili
- Safavid dynasty which ruled Iran from the 16th to the 18th century

== See also ==
- Safavid Iran, or Safavid Persia, or the Safavid Empire
- Mughal–Safavid war (disambiguation)
