= Daulat Khan Mayi =

17th century Mughal administrator

- Daulat Khan (Khawas Khan) in c. 1620.

Mughal governor of Thatta
- In office 2 July 1635 – 24 June 1640
- Monarch: Shah Jahan
- Preceded by: Yusuf Muhammad Khan Tashqandi
- Succeeded by: Khawaja Kamgar Ghayrat Khan

Mughal governor of Kandahar
- In office 27 August 1646 – 22 February 1649
- Preceded by: Sai'd Khan
- Succeeded by: Mihrab Khan (as Safavid governor)

Personal details
- Born: c. 1590 Subah of Lahore
- Died: c. 1650

Daulat Khan Mayi, also known as Khawas Khan and Daulat Khan Bhatti, was a Mughal administrator who served as Subahdar (governor) of Thatta Subah during 1635–1640 and then of Kandahar during 1646–1649. His surrender of the fort of Kandahar to the Safavid ruler Shah Abbas II on 22 February 1649 after a siege of 57 days marked the third and final loss of Kandahar by the Mughals.

== Early life ==
Daulat Khan was born in the Subah of Lahore in c. 1590 and belonged to the Mayi clan of the Bhatti tribe of Punjab. He started his career in the service of Sheikh Farid Bukhari, a prominent noble, and owing to his physical beauty and valour soon caught the attention of emperor Jahangir. He was made the captain of imperial guard, and after distinguishing himself in the Deccan wars, rose to be the commander of 5000 during the reign of Shah Jahan.

== Career ==
On 2 July 1635 Daulat Khan was appointed to the Thatta Subah with a rank of 3000/2000, where he remained until 24 June 1640. Much of his tenure at Thatta was uneventful other than an episode in 1636 in which he arrested an imposter of the rebel Mughal prince Baisunghar and sent him to the imperial court where he was put to death.

On 27 August 1646, Daulat Khan was appointed with a rank of 4000/4000 (promoted to 5000/5000 on 13 May 1647) to the governorship of Kandahar, over which Safavids had claim since the time of Tahmasp I. Hearing of the disaster of the Mughal army at Balkh and Badakhshan, Shah Abbas II led an army of 40,000 to Kandahar and besieged it in December 1648. The Mughal garrison under Daulat Khan fought for one and a half months but by February defeatist attitude spread among the soldiers, who due to winter did not hope for reinforcement to arrive before spring. When Daulat Khan tried to enforce discipline it resulted in a mutiny. Ultimately, Daulat Khan surrendered the fort to Shah Abbas on 22 February, 1649. He died shortly after.
