= Qulij Khan Turani =

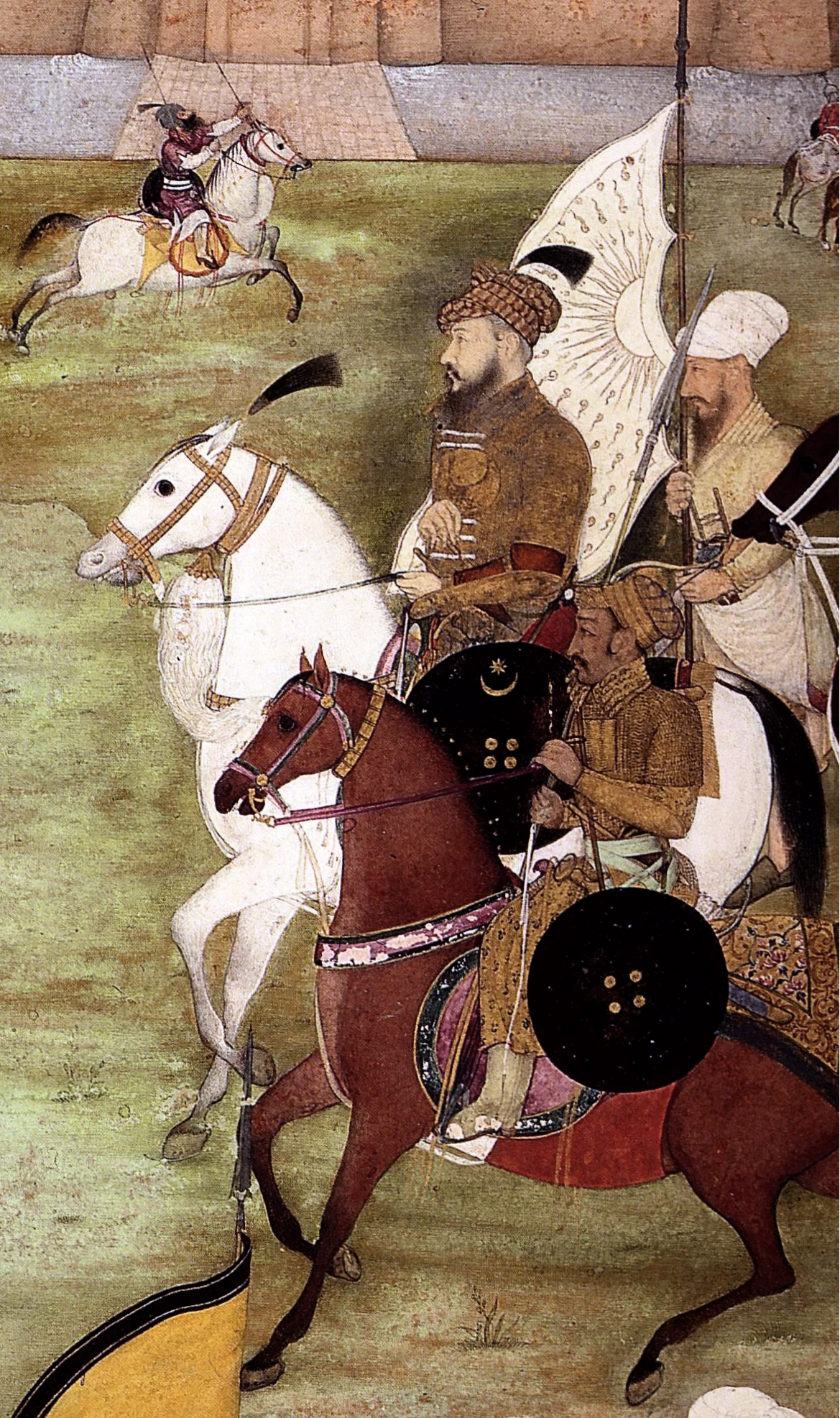
Qulij Khan Turani in 1638 at the Siege of Bost. Painting attributed to Murad. Mughal, ca. 1646. Musée Guimet, Paris.

Qulij Khan Turani, also Qilich Khan Turani (died 1654) was a Mughal governor and general who fought against the Safavids in 1638–39.

On May 3, 1638, Qulij Khan Turani, previously governor of Multan, arrived from Multan to Kandahar with imperial decrees in order to take possession of the fortress as imperial governor, following the Surrender of Kandahar of February-March 1638. He then participated to later campaigns to take Safavid fortresses in Afghanistan, particularly capturing the fortress of Bost from Mihrab Khan in 1638 at the Siege of Bost (1638).

As a youth, Qulij Khan Turani was a follower and servant of 'Abdullah Khan Zakhmi.

Qulij Khan Turani also held various positions as Governor: Ruler of Multan (1631–1638), Governor of Kandahar (1638-), Subah of Multan (1641–1642), Subah of Lahore (1643–1645). He was also Governor of Delhi in the reign of Shah Jahan.

A portrait of Qulij Khan Turani dated ca. 1640 appears in the Shah Jahan Album, with a mention in Shah Jahan's own hand reading "a portrait of Qilich Khan, governor of Qandahar Fort, done by La'lchand" (shabih-i Qilich Khan hakim-i qal 'a-i Qandahar 'amal-i La'/chand).

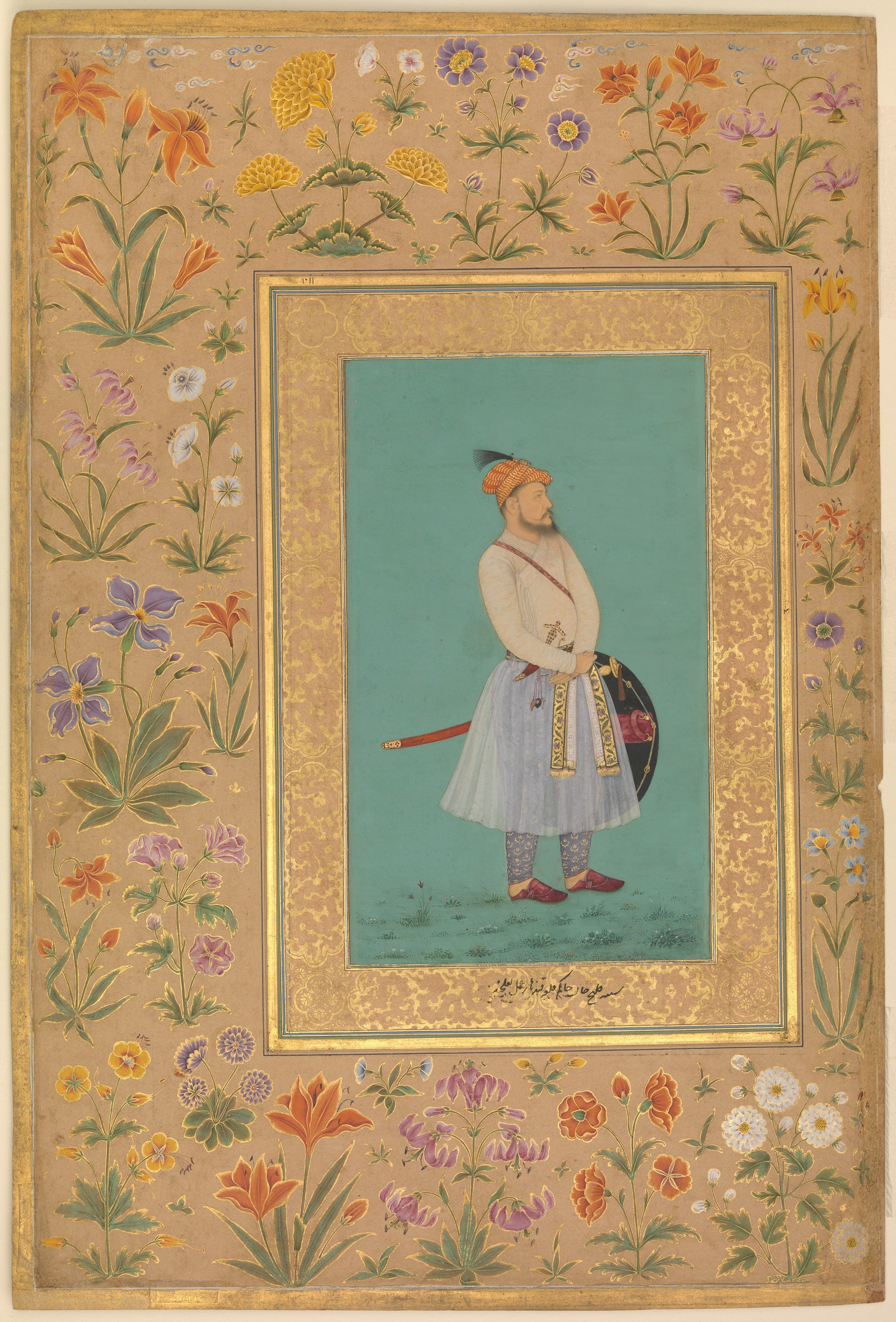
Portrait of Qilich Khan Turani. Shah Jahan Album. Painting by La'lchand. ca. 1640

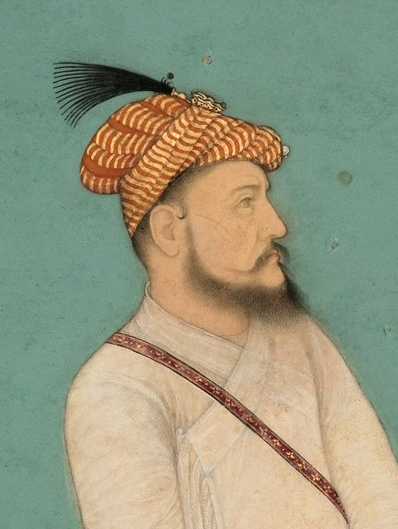
Portrait of Qilich Khan Turani (detail). Shah Jahan Album. Painting by La'lchand. ca. 1640
