= Lashkari Bazar =

- Archeological site
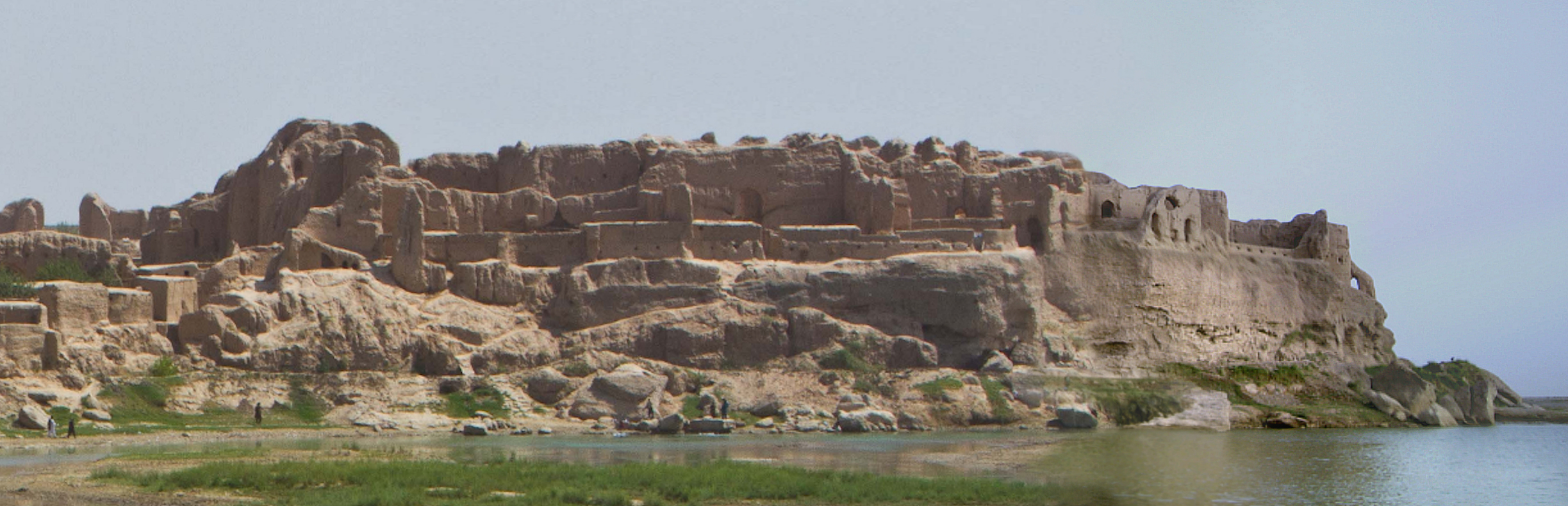
- Ruins of the Ghaznavid Palace of Lashkari Bazar, in Lashkargah (the South Palace, seen from the north).

- Location in Afghanistan Lashkari Bazar (Continental Asia)
- Coordinates: 31.565961°N 64.350822°E
- Country: Afghanistan
- Province: Helmand

Lashkari Bazar (Pashto: لشگری بازار "military market", locally known as Dari: کھنه قلعه Qala-e-Kohna "Old castle") was a palatial residence of rulers of the Ghaznavid Empire, located in Lashkargah in Afghanistan. The original name was probably al-'Askar.

== History ==
Some structural elements of the site date to the Parthian period. The Center palace (32x52 meters) is thought to be dating from the Samanid period (819-999 CE). The area had been conquered by the Arabs as early as 661 CE, and developed to become a large and wealthy city.

The very large South Palace (170x100 meters) was probably founded by Mahmud of Ghazni (998-1030 CE), and expanded by his son Masud I (1030-41 CE). The palaces in Lashkari Bazar were the winter retreat of the Ghaznavid rulers, whose capital was in Ghazni. The South Palace was richly decorated with stucco, paintings, frescoes and carved marble panels. A large market street about 100 meters long, a bazaar, joins the palace structure.

The Northern palace was constructed by later rulers.

The Ghurid dynasty sacked the palaces in 1151 CE, but later restored them, and some portions of the architecture are attributed to them. They built the fortress of Qala-e-Bost about 7 kilometers to the south, together with an architectural arch.

== Palace architecture ==
There were three main palaces at Lashkari Bazar: the North palace, the Center palace, and the South palace. Mud brick was the main material used, with some additional support provided by fire brick.

=== Northern palace ===
The Northern palace had 3 courtyard buildings, separated by gardens. The entirety of the palace was also surrounded by a wall, which was supported by 15 semi-circular towers, four of the towers supported the corners.

=== Central palace ===
The Central Palace, like the Northern Palace, also had a wall that surrounded it, with the corners of the rectangle being supported by circular towers. The palace had two floors, divided into four quadrants that intersected at the center, which had barrel vaulted corridors. The north-south corridors had porticoes, and the east-west corridors formed additional rooms. An iwan was used to lead to the loggia on the second floor. The palace had many different rooms in each of the quadrants. The rooms had public and private entryways. To second floor was more private and can be entered through the south of the east-west corridors and can only be entered from the exterior.

=== Southern palace ===
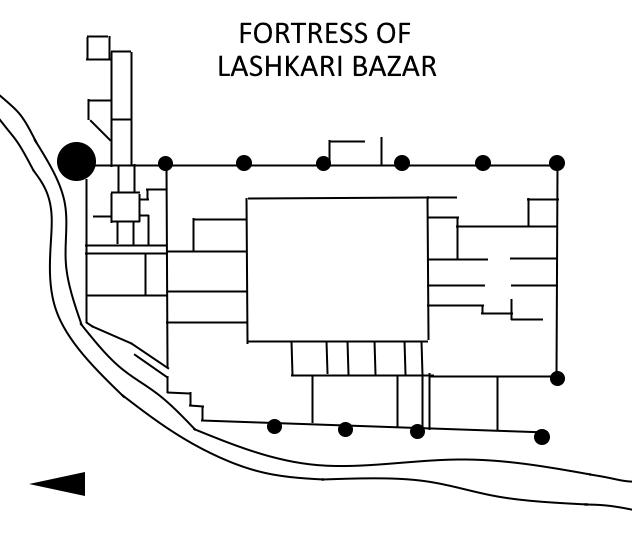
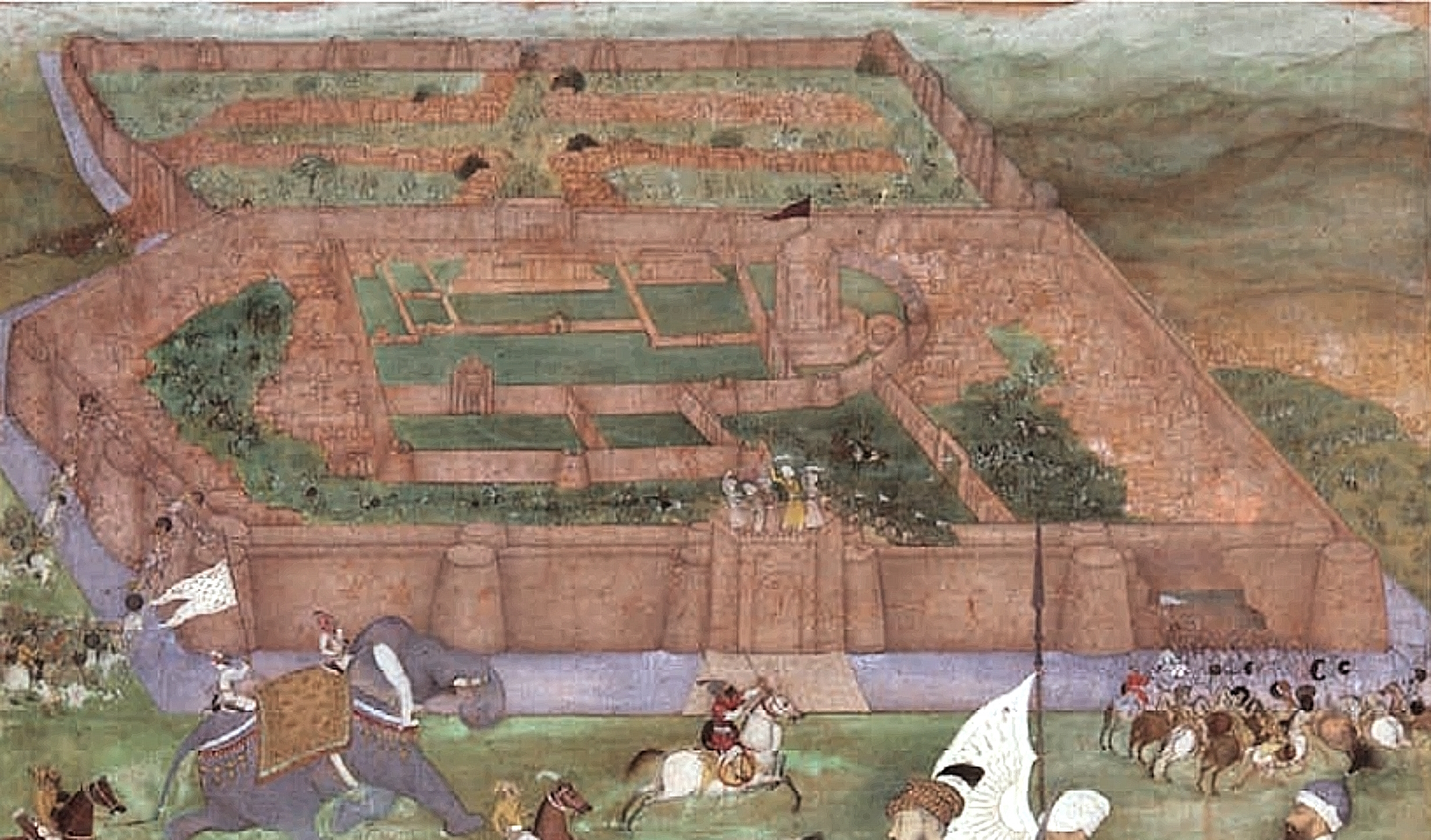
Plan of the fortress of Lashkari Bazar in the 20th century, and likely view during its capture by the Mughals from the Safavids in the Siege of Bost (1638).

The Southern palace, also known as the Grand palace or Main palace, was the most decorated palace of the three. The palace was constructed during the Ghaznavid dynasty's height of power. It was constructed with unbacked bricks, which were placed on fired bricks for support. The inspiration of the palace draws from Abbasid palace architecture, with the large courtyards, gardens, and open spaces. The palace was built in a rectangular shape with four iwans in the central courtyard. Behind the Iwan opposite the entrance were reception halls and perhaps throne rooms. The reception hall at the north end of the palace was the grandest of all, with panels of brick ribbon work with stucco insets, and murals decorating the walls. There were also private rooms built around four smaller iwans of a different courtyard. The palace overlooked the nearby town and also included a large mosque and a bazaar. The highlights of the palace were the wall paintings of the 44 armed men, which decorated the reception hall wall of the north end of the palace. Other decorations included dadoes, stepped paneling, rectangular panels, and epigraphic decorations in Arabic and Persian. The Southern Palace experienced two fires. The first was due to the Jahän-süz destruction, however, the palace was rebuilt. The second fire was due to the Mongol invasion in the 13th century, and this invasion led to the abandonment of the palace.

== Paintings from Lashkari Bazar ==
The paintings that line the walls at Lashkari Bazar are some of the most detailed early Islamic pieces of art found in Afghanistan. The main focus in these paintings are royal figures, musicians, and attendants; seemingly depicting anyone who was likely in a high status position. They are painted with bright colored paints, primarily red, gold, and black. Most of these figures appear to be well-dressed, wearing rich patterned clothes, long robes, trousers, and capes or mantles that are perfectly draped over the figures shoulders. One of the classic decorative Sasanian designs is the pearl roundel motifs, if you look really closely this pearl design can be seen on the right side of the Ghaznavid figure. They all appear to be topped with sparkling jewelry, elaborate earrings, necklaces, head ornaments and bracelets. Some individuals are sitting on thrones, others holding glasses for drinking. All these figures appear to be males, simply based on their clothing, jewelry and hair styles.

These scenes are able to give some insight to what a royal Ghaznavid family would value, this public display of wealth and status through richly ornamented garments, jewelry, and activities. The design of these artworks seems to mix Persian, Sasanian, and Byzantine art traditions. A good example of this is the face of the Portrait from the Southern Palace Courtroom. Here the figure is painted frontally, a pose associated with Sasanian elite imagery, while wearing the elaborate textiles, associated with art from the late Sasanian and Byzantine empires. In other sections of the palace, geometric and floral designs cover the walls. They are mostly done with blues and greens, created from materials like lapis. Overall both the paintings and general design of the palace as a whole reflect this cultural fusion of influences.

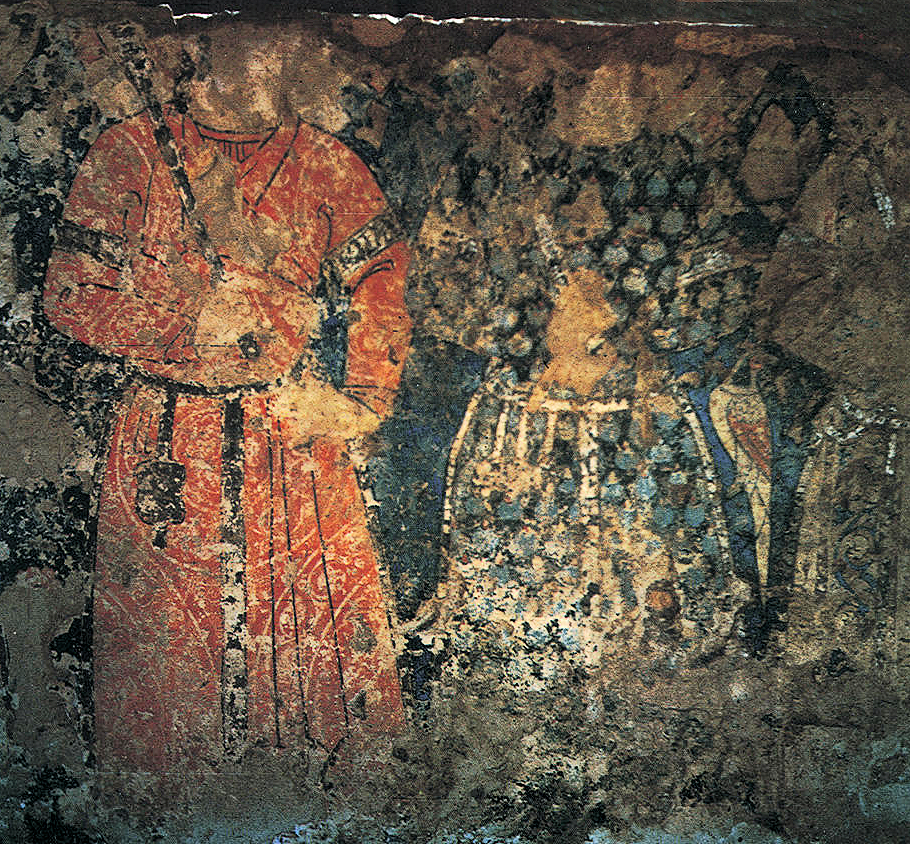
Ghaznavid figures in the wall paintings from Laškarī Bāzār

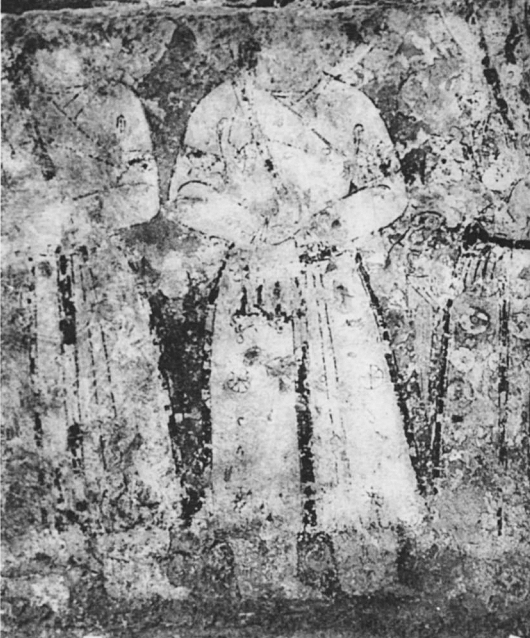
Painting from the Palace courtroom, Lashkari Bazar

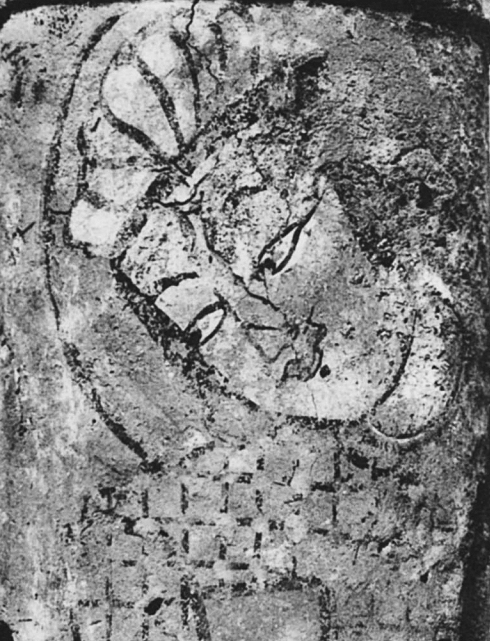
Portrait from the Southern Palace courtroom, Lashkari Bazar.
