= Mughal–Persian wars =

Series of wars fought in the 17th and 18th centuries

- Part of Decline of the Mughal Empire
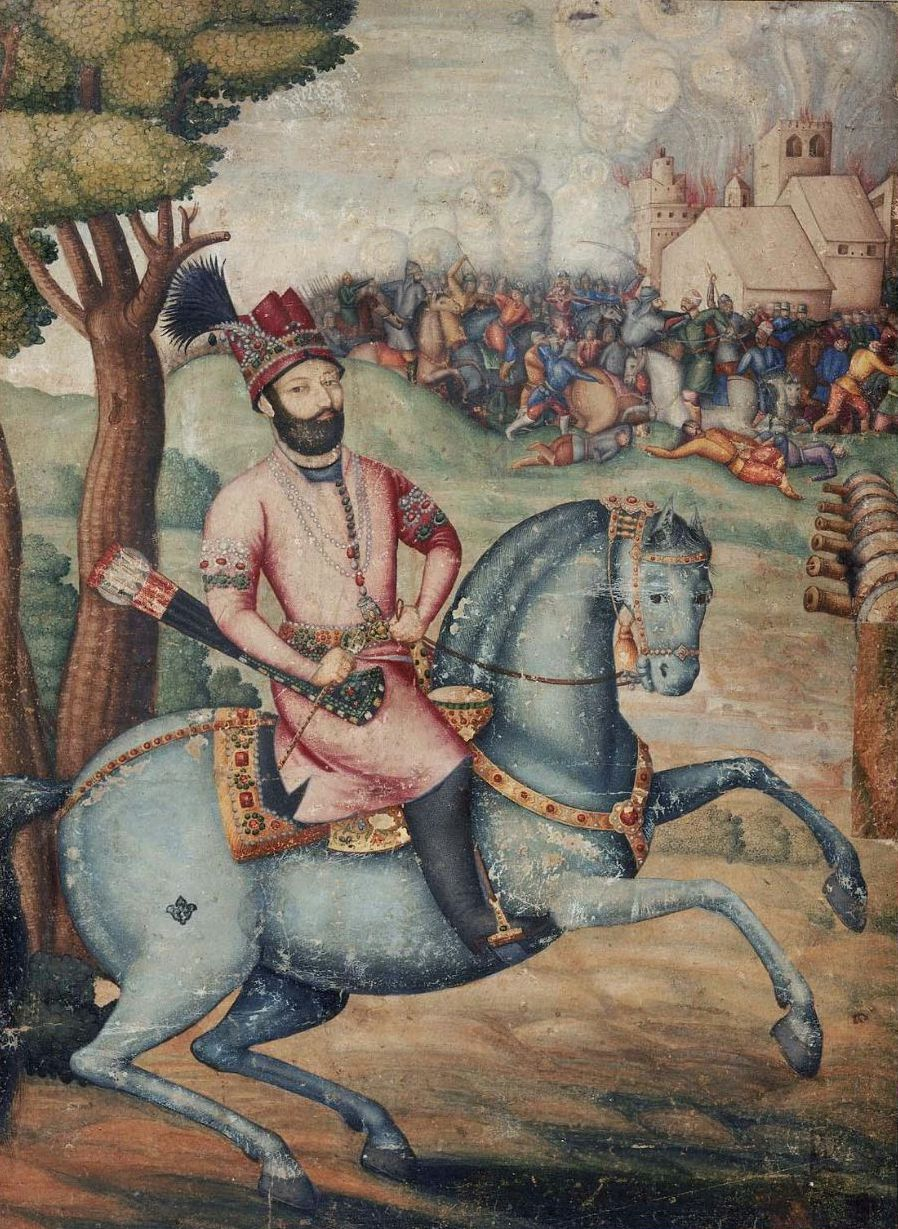
- Representation of Nader Shah at the sack of Delhi
Date	1557–16 May 1739
Location	Safavid and Afsharid Iran, Mughal India

Belligerents
Safavid Iran; Afsharid Iran	Mughal Empire

Commanders and leaders
Tahmasp I Abbas I of Persia; Abbas II of Persia; Mehrāb Khān; Autar Khan; Nader Shah; Heraclius II of Georgia	Akbar; Jahangir; Kilich Khan; Murad Bakhsh; Dara Shikoh; Aurangzeb; Muhammad Shah

The Mughal–Persian wars or Mughal–Iranian wars were a series of wars fought in the 16th, 17th and 18th centuries between the Safavid and Afsharid Empires of Persia, and the Mughal Empire of India, over what is now Afghanistan. The Mughals consolidated their control of what is today India and Pakistan in the 16th century, and gradually came into conflict with the powerful Safavids and Afsharids, led by Abbas the Great and Nader Shah respectively. Aside from Nader Shah's invasion of the Mughal Empire, most of the conflict between the two powers were limited to battles for control over Kandahar. From a Safavid point of view, the Mughal army counted as "far less formidable" than that of their arch rivals the Ottomans.

== War of 1557–1558 ==
Shah Tahmasp of Persia tried to exploit the inexperience of the young Mughal Emperor Akbar, then an adolescent. He sent an army to lay siege to Kandahar, a vital southern Afghan city held by Shah Muhammad, a governor appointed by the Mughal regent Bairam Khan. With no way to offer military assistance, Akbar was compelled to surrender Kandahar to the Persians. The Persians held the city on and off for almost four decades before the Mughals recovered it in 1595.

== War of 1605–1606 ==
The siege of Kandahar lasted from November 1605 to January 1606 and was led by Safavids to take the Mughal frontier city of Kandahar. After two months of constant assaults, the relief army forced the Persians to retreat. Thus, resulted in a victory for the Mughal Empire of India.

With the unsuccessful siege, Kandahar remained in the hands of the Mughals.

== War of 1622–1623 ==
The Mughal–Safavid war of 1622–1623 was fought over the important fortress city of Kandahar, in Afghanistan, between the Safavid empire of Persia and the Mughal empire of India. It resulted in a clear Persian victory.

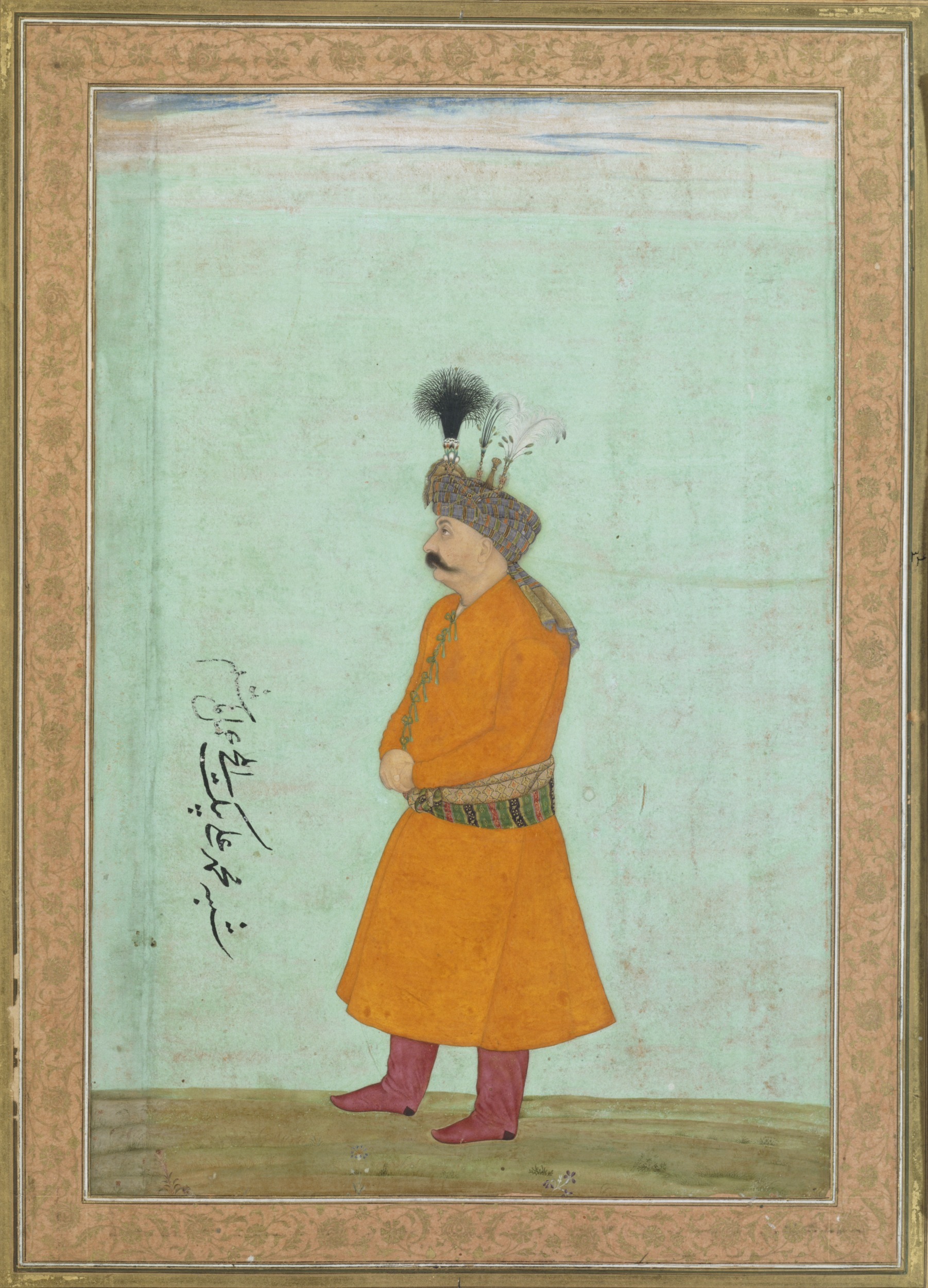
Muhammad Ali Beg was the Persian ambassador sent to the Mughal court of Jahangir by Abbas I of Persia, arriving in time for Muharram in March 1631. He remained there until October 1632, thus negotiating an end to the conflict between the Mughals and the Safavids.

Having secured crushing victories against the Ottomans, Shah Abbas desired to capture the strategic fortress on Kandahar since he had lost it in 1595. In 1605 the governor of Herat, Hosayn Khan, besieged the city but the tenacious defense of the Mughal governor, Shah Beg Khan, and the arrival in the next year of a relieving Mughal army to Kandahar forced the Safavids to retreat. With the conclusion of the Ottoman–Safavid war (1603–1618), Shah Abbas was secure enough for a war on his eastern frontier, so in 1621 he ordered an army to gather at Nishapur. After celebrating the new year at Tabas Gilaki in southern Khorasan, Abbas joined with his army and marched on Kandahar where he arrived on 20 May and immediately began the siege. Though Jahangir already had information of the Persian's movements, he was too slow to respond, and without reinforcements the small garrison of 3,000 men could not hold for long against the superior Persian army.

The Emperor asked his son and heir apparent Khurram who was at Mandu in the Deccan to lead the campaign, but Khurram evaded the assignment fearing to lose his political power while he was away from court. The relief force the Mughal's could assembled proved too small to raise the siege, so after a 45-day siege the city fell on 22 June followed shortly after by Zamindawar. After fortifying the city and appointing Ganj Ali Khan as governor of the city, Abbas returned to Khorasan via Ghur, subduing on the way troubling emirs in Chaghcharan and Gharjistan. The rebellion of Khurram absorbed the Mughal's attention, so in the spring of 1623 a Mughal envoy arrived at the Shah's camp with a letter from the Emperor accepting the loss of Kandahar and putting an end to the conflict.

== War of 1638 ==
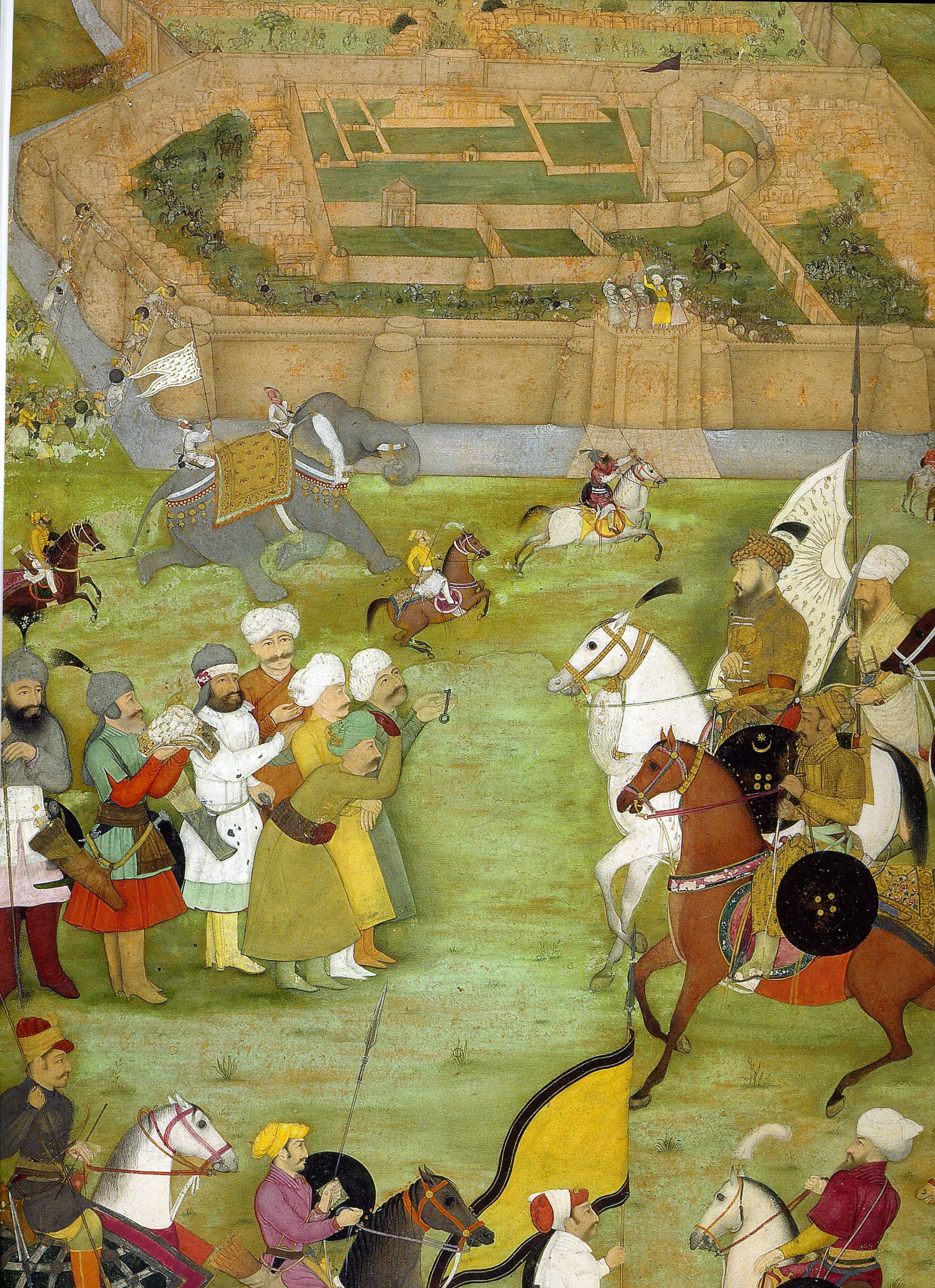
The Safavids surrendering the keys of Kandahar to Mughal general Kilij Khan

The Mughal-Safavid war of 1638 took place over the city of Kandahar in present day Afghanistan. The war resulted in a victory for the Mughals, and Ali Mardan Khan surrendered the keys of Kandahar to the Mughals.

== War of 1649–1653 ==
The Mughal–Safavid war of 1649–1653 was fought between the Mughal and Safavid empires in the territory of modern Afghanistan. The war began after a Persian army, while the Mughals were at war with the Janid Uzbeks, captured the fortress city of Kandahar and other strategic cities that controlled the region. The Mughals attempted unsuccessfully to regain the city from the Persians, thus the war resulted in a Persian victory.

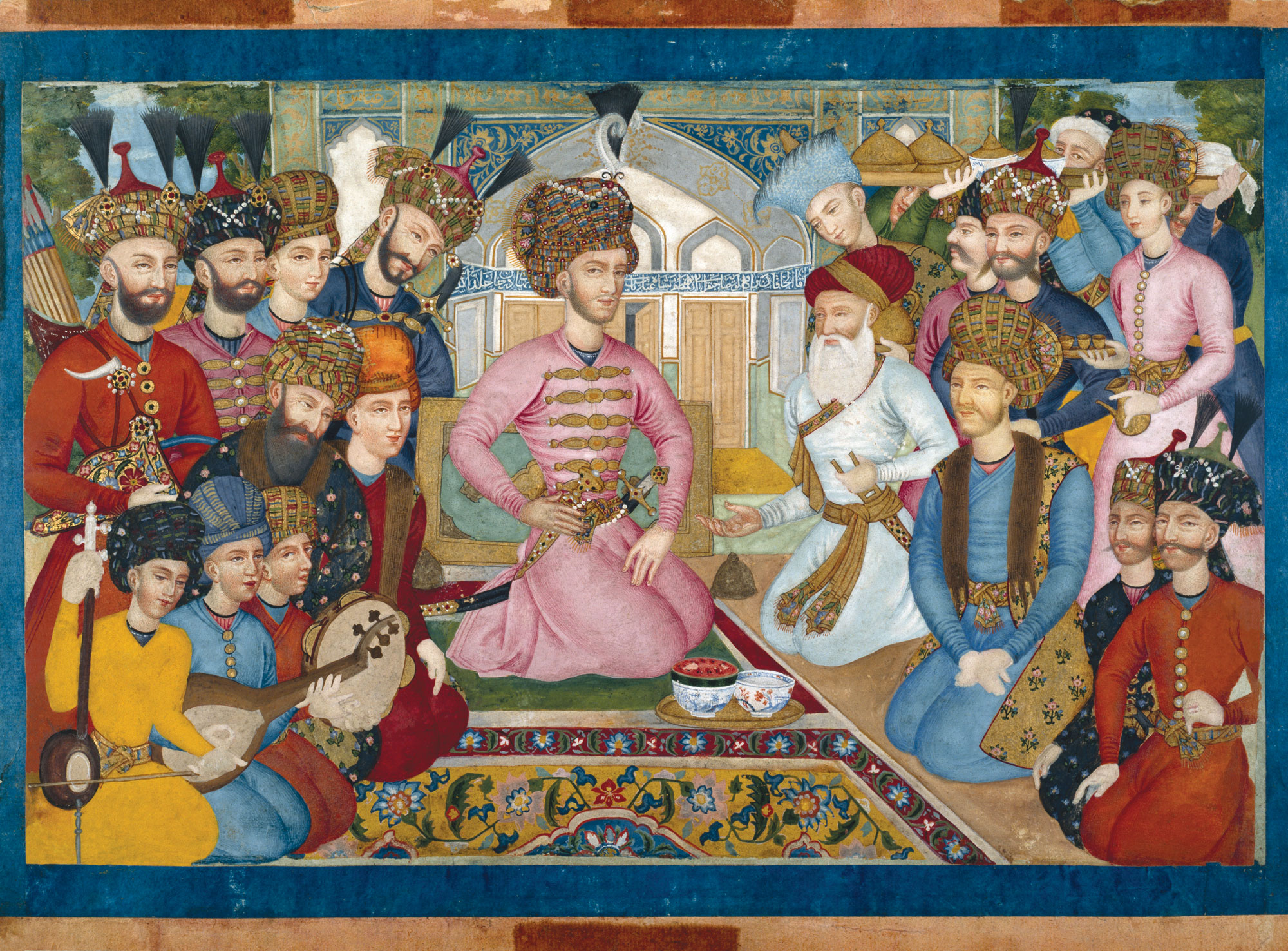
Abbas II of Persia and the Mughal ambassador. 17th century Persian painting

== Nadir Shah's invasion of India ==
Attracted by its wealth and knowing that the victim was much weaker, Nader, the Shah of Iran (1736–47) and founder of the Afsharid dynasty, invaded Northern India with a fifty-five thousand strong army, eventually attacking Delhi in March 1739 where he completely sacked and looted the city, after issuing orders for a general massacre to take place. His army had defeated the Mughal emperor Muhammad Shah at the battle at Karnal in less than three hours and had taken over control of northern India. The Mughal emperor Muhammad Shah had to beg Nader to grant him and his people mercy, after ceding the keys of the city and royal treasury to him. (Which included the Peacock throne, Darya-e noor and Koh-i-Noor).

The Battle of Karnal (13 February 1739), was a decisive victory for Nader Shah, the emperor of the Afsharid dynasty during his invasion of India. The Shah's forces defeated the numerically superior army of Muhammad Shah, the Indian emperor of the Mughal dynasty, in about three hours, thus paving the way for the Persian sack of Delhi. The battle took place at Karnal, 110 kilometres (68 mi) north of Delhi.
