= Mughal sieges of Kandahar (1649–1653) =

Series of sieges of Kandahar during the Mughal–Safavid War

Sieges of Kandahar
- Part of the Mughal–Safavid war (1649–1653)
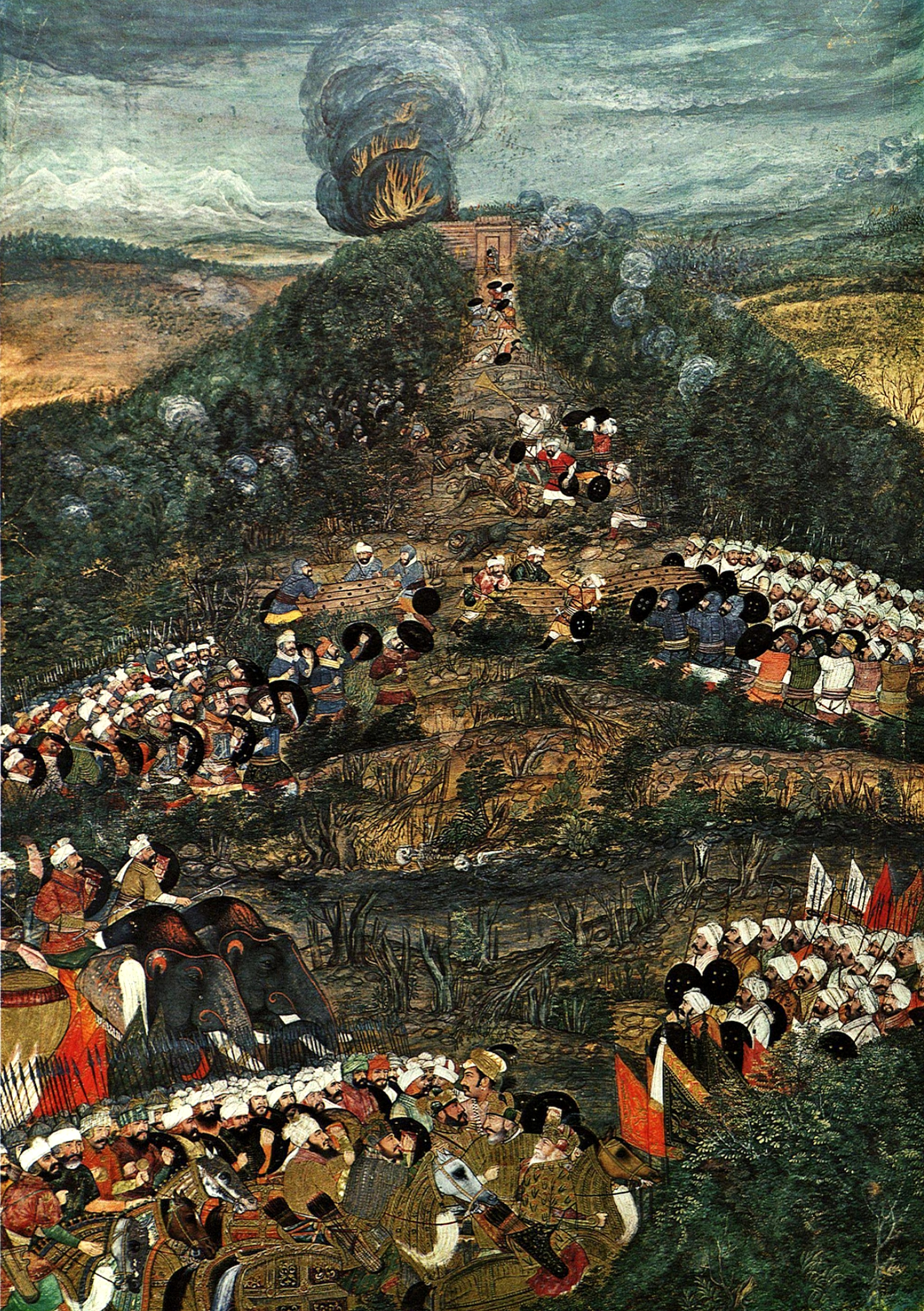
- A failed Mughal Siege of Kandahar in 1649-1653. Attributed to Payag. Mughal, mid-17th century. Padshahnama. Opaque watercolor on paper.
Location	Kandahar, Afghanistan
Result	Safavid victory

Belligerents
Mughal Empire	Safavid Iran

During the Mughal–Safavid war of 1649–1653, the Mughal Empire laid siege to the city of Kandahar in Afghanistan three times. All three sieges failed, and thus the Mughal Empire was unable to retake control of Kandahar from the Safavids.

== History ==
=== Background ===
In the mid 17th-century, rising tensions between the Safavid Empire and the Mughal Empire led to a number of territorial disputes in Afghanistan. Control of Afghanistan was centered around two key cities, Kabul and Kandahar; by the 1630s the Mughals were in control of Kabul, while the Safavid's controlled Kandahar. A major development came in 1638 when the Safavid governor of Kandahar, Ali Mardan Khan, betrayed the Safavids and gave control of the city over to the Mughals in the Fall of Kandahar (1638). This event provoked further tensions between the two empires.

In 1647, a Mughal attempt to conquer Badakhshan ended in failure. Seizing on the weakness of its rival, the Safavid Empire invaded the Mughal-controlled parts of Afghanistan in early 1649, beginning the Mughal–Safavid war. The Safavids won a major victory in February of that year when Kandahar was captured after a two-month siege.

=== Sieges ===
==== First siege (1649) ====
The loss of Kandahar was seen as a major strategic loss for the Mughal Empire. Furthermore, the Mughals saw the defeat as a blow to the empire's prestige, and Emperor Shah Jahan was determined to see the city returned to Mughal control. To this end he outfitted an expedition of 50,000 soldiers led by Prince Aurangzeb, Sadullah Khan (an adviser of the Mughal Court), and Jai Singh I of Jaipur. They advanced on Kandahar in April 1649, and spent several months fighting against Safavid forces in the flat countryside outside of the city. However, the Mughal army faced severe supply issues, and the army lacked sufficient artillery to breach the walls of Kandahar. On 5 September 1649, the Mughal army retreated, having lost 3,000 men and thousands of draft animals.

==== Second siege (1652) ====
With the first siege defeated, the Mughals began to prepare for a second attempt to retake the city. For the second siege, the Mughals invested more in artillery by ordering the casting of larger siege cannons. The second expedition was also better funded, and employed camels as draft animals. As with the first expedition, Prince Aurangzeb, Sadullah Khan, and Jai Singh were in command.

On 2 May 1652, the second expedition arrived outside Kandahar, where the force began digging siege trenches. However, the Safavid defenders of Kandahar possessed more accurate gunners (due to the Safavid Empire often warring with the Ottoman Empire in Persia), while the Mughal artillery was noted as being inaccurate. This issue was compounded when the Mughal Emperor ordered that no assault be conducted before the city walls had been breached, which the outgunned and outfought Mughal army was unable to do. In light of this, the emperor ordered that Auragzeb withdraw his army to Kabul, an order which was carried out on 9 July 1652.

==== Third siege (1653) ====
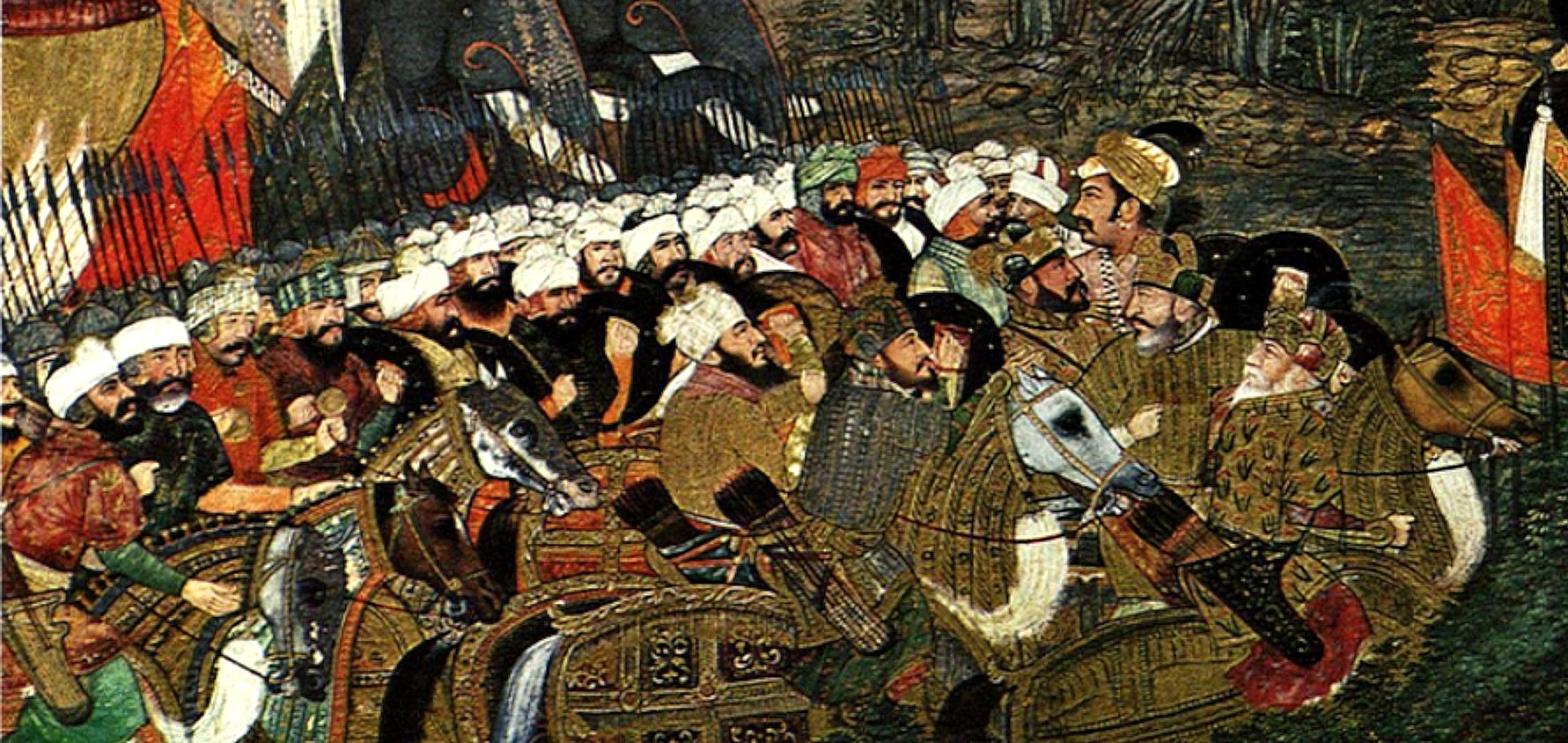
Siege of Qandahar, led by Dara Shikoh (detail) in October 1653. Painting by Payag.

The Mughals attempted to recapture Kandahar in the spring of 1653. Having failed twice, Prince Aurangzeb was replaced by his brother, Prince Dara Shukoh, who was the heir to the Mughal Empire. Dara headed a force of 70,000 soldiers commanded by a number of experienced Mughal generals and Jai Singh, whose efforts in the previous two sieges had been commended. However, Dara also delegated many of his tasks to his advisers, who often fought each other for his favor. The Mughal generals also resented that the prince favored his advisers over more experienced military commanders.

The third expedition arrived in Kandahar in April, where the army attempted to find a way to breach the city walls. However, the Mughal gunnery remained poor, and Dara was noted as being an incompetent military commander, often ordering and then countermanding ill-fated assaults. Some soldiers in the army were poorly equipped for a siege, having been outfitted for fighting a traditional line battle in the field. In June, an attempt to capture part of the city's walls failed due to Dara's interference, and by late summer discontent was growing within the army. With no victory in sight, the siege was lifted on 29 September 1653. The defeat of the final siege marked the effective end of the Mughal–Safavid war.
