= Mihrab Khan =

Safavid military commander (died 1649)

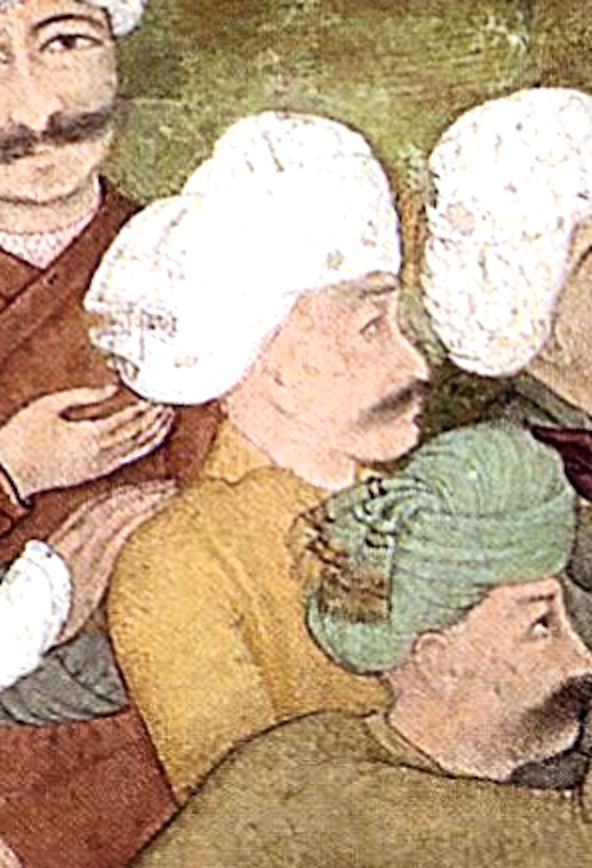
- Surrender of Mihrab Khan (detail) to the Mughal general Qulij Khan Turani at the Siege of Bost (1638). Musée Guimet (MA 3318)

Governor of Bost
- In office 1638–1641
- Monarch: Safi
- Preceded by: Rezaqoli Soltan Siyah-Mansur
- Succeeded by: Dust 'Ali Khan Zanganeh

Governor of Astarabad
- In office 1642–1648
- Monarch: Abbas II
- Preceded by: Hosayn Khan b. Zaman Beg Mazandarani
- Succeeded by: Allahverdi Khan (Armenian)

Governor of Kandahar
- In office 1649
- Preceded by: Mughal rule
- Succeeded by: Otar Beg

Personal details
- Died: 1649 Kandahar, Safavid Iran
- Clan: Mirimanidze

Military service
- Allegiance: Safavid Iran

Mihrab Khan (died 1649) was a military commander in Safavid Iran. A member of the Mirimanidze clan, he is first mentioned as serving as the governor of Bost at an unknown date. Later, he was appointed as the governor of Astarabad, and in 1649 was appointed as the governor of the newly captured city of Kandahar, where he died later that year. In Kandahar, he was succeeded by his Georgian kinsman Otar Beg.

== Gallery ==
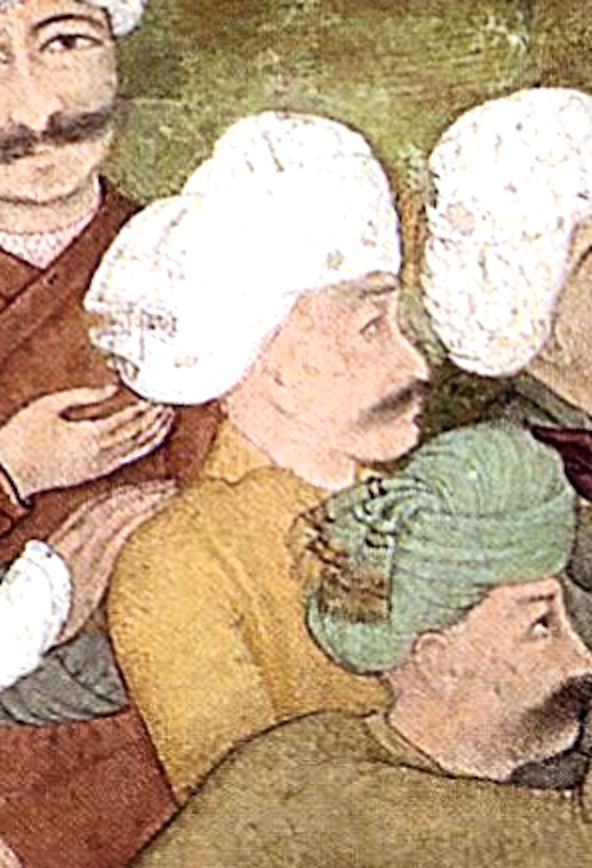
Mihrab Khan surrendering the keys of Bost to Qulij Khan

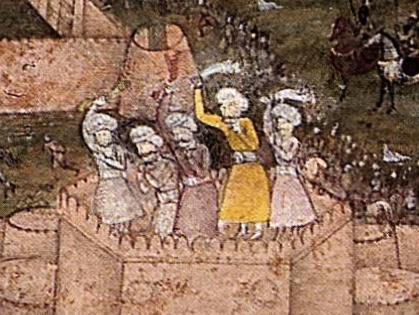
Surrendering in the Siege of Bost

== Sources ==
- Floor, Willem M. (2008). Titles and Emoluments in Safavid Iran: A Third Manual of Safavid Administration, by Mirza Naqi Nasiri. Washington, DC: Mage Publishers. pp. 153, 169, 257. ISBN 978-1933823232.
- Matthee, Rudi (2010). "KANDAHAR iv. From The Mongol Invasion Through the Safavid Era". Encyclopaedia Iranica, Vol. XV, Fasc. 5. pp. 478–484.
- Babaie, Sussan (2004). Slaves of the Shah: New Elites of Safavid Iran. I.B.Tauris. pp. 1–218. ISBN 9781860647215.

Preceded by Rezaqoli Soltan Siyah-Mansur	Governor of Bost; 1638-1641	Succeeded by Dust 'Ali Khan Zanganeh
Preceded by Hosayn Khan b. Zaman Beg Mazandarani	Governor of Astarabad; 1642-1648	Succeeded by Allahverdi Khan (Armenian)
Preceded by Mughal rule	Governor of Qandahar; 1649	Succeeded by Otar Beg
