= Mughal Central Asia campaign =

1645–1647 Mughal military campaign

Mughal Central Asia Campaign
Date	1645–1647
Location	Central Asia
Result	Status quo ante bellum: Plunder of southern Uzbek territories
Territorial changes	Uzbek territories of Balkh and Badakhshan falls to Mughal India for a time period with Murad Bakhsh becoming its governor.

Belligerents
Mughal Empire; Kingdom of Amber; Nurpur kingdom	Khanate of Bukhara; Kazakh Khanate

Commanders and leaders
Shah Jahan; Murad Bakhsh; Aurangzeb; Asalat Khan Jai Singh I Jagat Singh	(Khanate of Bukhara) Nazr Muhammad Khan (Khanate of Bukhara) Abd al-Aziz Khan (Kazakh Khanate) Salqam Jangir Khan

Strength
60,000 cavalry	120,000 Uzbek forces 100,000 Kazakh forces

Casualties and losses
5,000 men 14,000 men of Nurpur kingdom	Unknown but much more

The Mughal Central Asia Campaign, also known as the Balkh Campaign, was a military campaign from 1645–1647 undertook by Mughal emperor Shah Jahan against the Uzbek Khanate of Bukhara in Central Asia. It notably involved an Indian army crossing the Hindu Kush in battle. The campaign was technically a stalemate.

== Background ==
The Uzbeks and Mughals' relations in the early 17th century was relatively peaceful, and the Janid ruler of Bukhara Imam Quli Khan had no intentions of jeopardizing the relationship, with Imam Quli even offering an alliance with the Mughals during their war with the Safavids. Despite an attempt by Imam Quli's ambitious brother Nazr Muhammad to take Kabul in 1627, the Uzbeks still endeavored to maintain stable relations with the Mughals. Muhammad also later sent an apology for the Kabul invasion in 1633 which Shah Jahan accepted.

In the early 1640s, Imam Quli Khan contracted ophthalmia, resulting in blindness. Nazr Muhammad capitalized on this opportunity and took control, against the wishes of his brother. Imam Quli Khan later died in Medina on pilgrimage in 1644. Nazr Muhammad was widely unpopular in his territory, as a result of his strict administration and heavy taxation. While in a campaign to conquer Khwarazm, the Atalıq of Muhammad's third son fell out with him and staged a revolt in Tashkent. Muhammad sent his son Abd al-Aziz to put down the revolt, but he betrayed him, joining the rebels and usurping the throne. This left Nazr Muhammad with only the territories of Balkh and Badakhshan. Shah Jahan was delighted with this outcome, as he was a known admirer of Transoxiana, part of Bukharan lands. Samarqand was one of the capitals of the Timurids, and the Mughals at times expressed revanchism, aiming to recapture the city. This made Shah Jahan launch a military campaign. This was because the Mughal lineage found provenance in Transoxiana, with historian Abdul Hamid Lahori writing in the Padshahnama, a history of Shah Jahan's reign, that "The Emperor's heart had been set up the conquest of Balkh and Badakhshan, which were hereditary territories of his house, and were the keys to the acquisition of Samarqand, the home and capital of his great ancestor Timur Sahib Qiran Sani." Therefore, when he heard of the deposing of Nazr Muhammad, he understood it as an opportunity to regain Transoxiana.

== Campaign ==
Shah Jahan first sent a host of officers, including Asalat Khan and Persian general Ali Mardan Khan to scout the area. The first reconnoitre in June 1645 led to the Thanedaar of Ghorband, Khalil Beg, taking Kahmard as its defending force had left to defend Hisar from Abd al-Aziz. However, he soon abandoned it and left for Zuhak, which resulted in Nazr Muhammad sending his generals Abdur Rahman and Tardi Ali Qatghan to retake the vulnerable fort. Nonetheless, the Mughals pushed on towards Badakhshan. Beg deemed the roads to Badakhshan too narrow for the army and noted that they lacked provisions and would struggle in the imminent winter. Therefore, they returned to Kabul after looting a few district towns. Later in October the ally king of Nurpur, Raja Jagat Singh, was sent on the second scouting mission to take Khost and build fortifications. He chose to build one between Andarab and Sarab which Nazr Muhammad's general Kafsh Qamaq attempted to take, but the 900 men army defended valiantly it until the Uzbeks retreated and reinforcements came, with Jagat Singh returning to Kabul on November 4. Meanwhile, Nazr Muhammad's rule was in disarray. His general and divan-begi Tardi Ali was exposed to be corrupt, which only caused Muhammad's popularity among his people to decrease. Abd al-Aziz detained Muhammad and only allowed him to administer Balkh. Muhammad, fearing for his safety, wrote a letter to Shah Jahan calling for military help, which reached the emperor in late January 1646.

Upon receiving the letter, Shah Jahan began mobilizing troops for the campaign. Shah Jahan then went to Kabul to oversee the campaign, which was led by his youngest son Murad Bakhsh. The army consisted of 60,000 units, around 2,208 officers, and they set off in late May 1646. The army split into two, one led by Murad and the other by Ali Mardan. The two armies converged temporarily at Charikar to clear the snow, but soon split again. Kilich Khan was instructed to capture Ghor and Kahmard. Although he, along with Khalil Beg, seized Kahmard without much trouble, the people of Ghor fought in a manner deemed by the Mughal command to be honorable and the Mughals spared the life of the governor of Ghor upon its capitulation. Afterwards, Badakhshan succumbed to the Mughals. After Asalat Khan took Kunduz, Shah Jahan ordered Murad to tell Nazr Muhammad his territories in Balkh would be retained if he surrendered. However, Muhammad thought cynically of the letter and fled to Persia (under Safavid rule), which enraged Murad and led to Muhammad being tracked down in Persia. The chase of Muhammad was a failure, however. On July 2, Balkh was subdued without much force, and Muhammad's 70 million rupee treasury came under Mughal control, although they had only managed to retain 12 million for the local people had plundered most of it. When hearing the news about Balkh, Shah Jahan was reportedly overjoyed and announced an eight-day holiday in celebration. He wrote to Safavid shah Abbas II that he planned to take both Samarkand and Bukhara afterwards.

Proceeding the relatively facile occupation of Balkh, Murad wrote home back to Shah Jahan in the middle of the festivities. Murad stated he was tired of the place, demanding to be recalled back to India. Moreover, the disgruntled soldiers began to lose discipline and began plundering the city. Shah Jahan indignantly replied that Murad would be viceroy of Transoxiana once Samarkand and Bukhara capitulated and Murad would be replaced and disgraced if he proceeded with leaving his post. This did not placate Murad however, and he returned to India, leaving his officers behind to govern the place. Shah Jahan was incensed and relinquished Murad's title of mansab. Shah Jahan then sent his trusted minister Saadullah Khan to govern the local towns and introduce Mughal standard currency in Balkh, which would be controlled by Bahadur Khan and Asalat Khan. Saadullah Khan returned to Kabul on September 6. A lack of a supreme leader led to the Mughal occupations in Balkh and Badakhshan being subject to frequent Uzbek attacks, engaging in many relatively minor conflicts with Uzbek tribes and raiders which only further provoked the soldiers. Abd al-Aziz stated that he intended to capitalize on the Mughal struggles.

In response, Shah Jahan redesignated his son Aurangzeb, then the subadar (governor) of Gujarat, to lead the Central Asian Campaign and restore order with an army of around 25,000 men who departed from Kabul on April 1647. Despite the comparatively small size of his army in commensuration with Murad's, Aurangzeb made the Uzbeks flee at the Derah-i-Garz valley and later defeated the Uzbeks near Balkh, then proceeding to the city with relative ease. They arrived at the city on May 25 and Aurangzeb left Rajput Madhu Singh Hada in command of the city. However, upon hearing this information, Abd al-Aziz gathered a large force of around 120,000 men to thwart the Mughals. These troops were led by Qutluq Muhammad and Beg Ughli. After three days at Balkh, Aurangzeb set off to confront the Uzbeks at Aqcha. They met on June 1, but Aurangzeb defeated them and prepared to retreat following the plunder of Beg Ughli's camp on June 5. However, they were met with the full force of the Uzbek army on June 7, but managed to beat the disorganized Uzbeks and return to Balkh on the 11th. Though, there were many difficulties for the Mughals at Balkh. The local people did not like the Mughals, and basic necessities were scarce. Shah Jahan knew that it would be impossible to maintain these provinces. Both sides wanted to make peace, with Abd al-Aziz quoted as saying "to fight with such a man [Aurangzeb] is to court one's ruin". Shah Jahan wished to concede Balkh to Nazr Muhammad on the basis he showed modesty. However, Muhammad accepted Balkh but did not show submission, on the basis of illness. In reality, he thought that they would accept anyway, given the coming winter, which was proven to be true. The Mughals were reluctant to face the winter of Bukhara. Aurangzeb, desperate to leave Balkh, hastily agreed and left on October 3, 1647. The last of the Mughal army returned to Kabul on November 10, marking the end of the campaign.

== Aftermath ==
Shah Jahan had spent 4 crores (40,000,000 rupees) on the campaign, but only made 22.5 lakhs (22,500,000 rupees) from farming the relatively dry lands of Balkh and Badakhshan. The Mughals also lost 10,000 lives, 5,000 dying through crossing the treacherous passes. This failure in conquering Transoxiana dissuaded the Mughals from any future attempts, leaving Shah Jahan's wish of reclaiming ancestral land unfulfilled. Nazr Muhammad held precarious control of Balkh until his death in 1651, and his son Subhan Quli Khan succeeded him. The Mughals' failure to secure Balkh and Badakhshan was perceived by Shah Abbas II of Persia as weakness which lead to war with the Safavids.
