= Jahangir Receives Prince Khurram =

17th-century Indian miniature painting

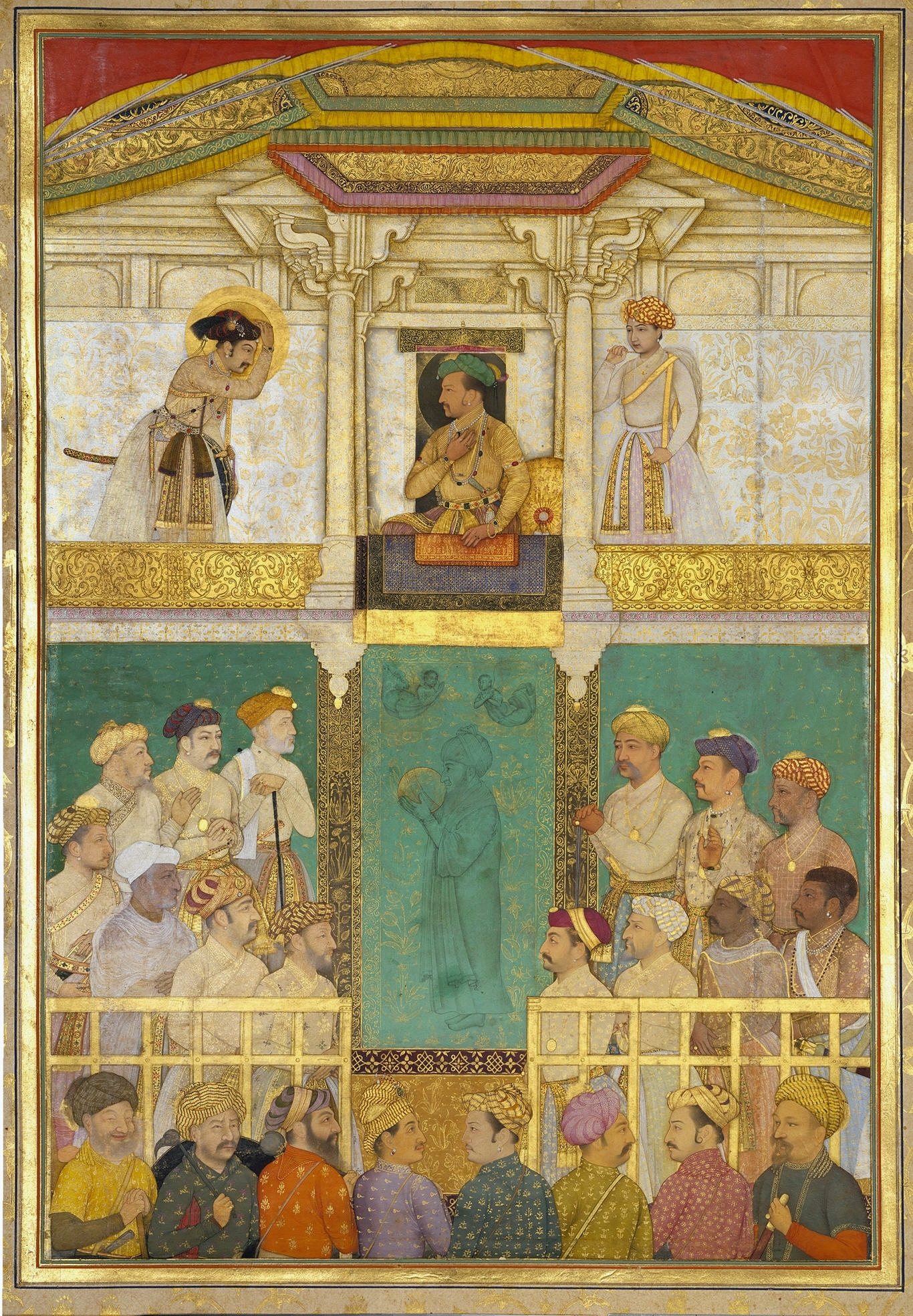
- Artist: 'Abid
- Medium: gouache paint and paper

Jahangir Receives Prince Khurram is an Indian Mughal miniature painting in the Royal Collection. It is a folio in a manuscript of the Padshahnama, known as the Windsor Padshahnama, dating to the 17th century, probably between 1635 and 1640; the scene it shows was from 1616.

== Background ==
The miniature is from the Padshahnama, a chronicle of the reign of the Mughal emperor Shah Jahan. This scene, however, is from the reign of his father, the emperor Jahangir. It depicts Shah Jahan as a prince (thus known by his personal name "Khurram" rather than his title "Shah Jahan") paying obeisance to his father.

The scene depicted is dated to 1616, when the prince was leaving for a military campaign in the Deccan, against Malik Ambar. It depicts the court at Ajmer at the time when Jahangir appointed the prince as his heir apparent and awarded him the title of Shah. This conferment was highly unusual, since Shah (meaning "king") is a title that was not usually awarded to a prince while the emperor still lived.

== Description ==
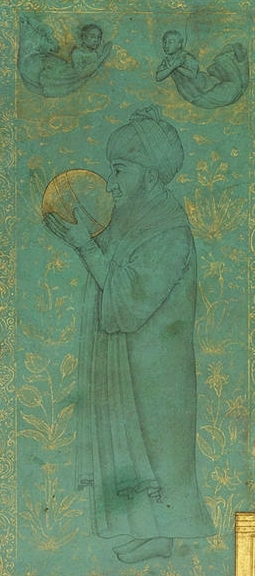
The saint is transparent, as though existing on a divine plane of reality in contrast with the rest of the painting's worldly status.

The depicted scene is of a royal durbar. The painting is hierarchically divided into three registers. The first register, at the top, depicts the prince Khurram paying his respects his father, the emperor Jahangir. The prince is standing to the left of the emperor, and is greeting the emperor, with his right arm raised in a gesture of respect. The emperor has his right arm placed upon his chest, in a gesture of acknowledgement. A servant stands to the back, almost blending into the background.

The second register, below the royal balcony, is occupied by the important noblemen of the court. These include I'timad-ud-Daulah, Asaf Khan, Mahabat Khan, and future Karan Singh II. They are enclosed by a railing, which separates them from the other attendants and servants, which occupy the lowest portion of the painting. Several courtiers are wearing gold medallions bearing the likeness of the emperor, either upon their turbans, or hanging around their necks.

In the central panel of the second register, right below the emperor's throne, there is a Grisaille depiction of a bearded saint holding a golden globe, as if offering it to the prince. The holding of the globe is an allegorical reference to kingship of the world. Two angels are flying above the saint. Contrasting with the opaque courtiers that surround him, the saintly figure is completely transparent, and blends into the green background. This depicts the coexistence of two separate planes of reality, the worldly and the divine. The ghostly figure of the saint exists on the divine plane, while the opaque courtiers exist on the wordly plane. While the emperor is appointing the prince as his heir apparent, the kingship is actually being offered by the saint, as symbolized by the globe. The saint bears a resemblance to earlier depictions of Mu'in al-Din Chishti. Alternatively, he might be Khizr.

Finally, the third register, at the bottom, consists of eight people standing just outside of the railing. Each wears a different style of turban, thus indicating their diverse origins. While the important noblemen had to be depicted in a standardized way so that they may be recognisable across various group portraits, the artist has depicted these lesser nobles in a more inventive style. The laughing man, at the bottom left of the painting, is an example of this.
