= Asalat Khan =

17th-century Mughal Empire noble

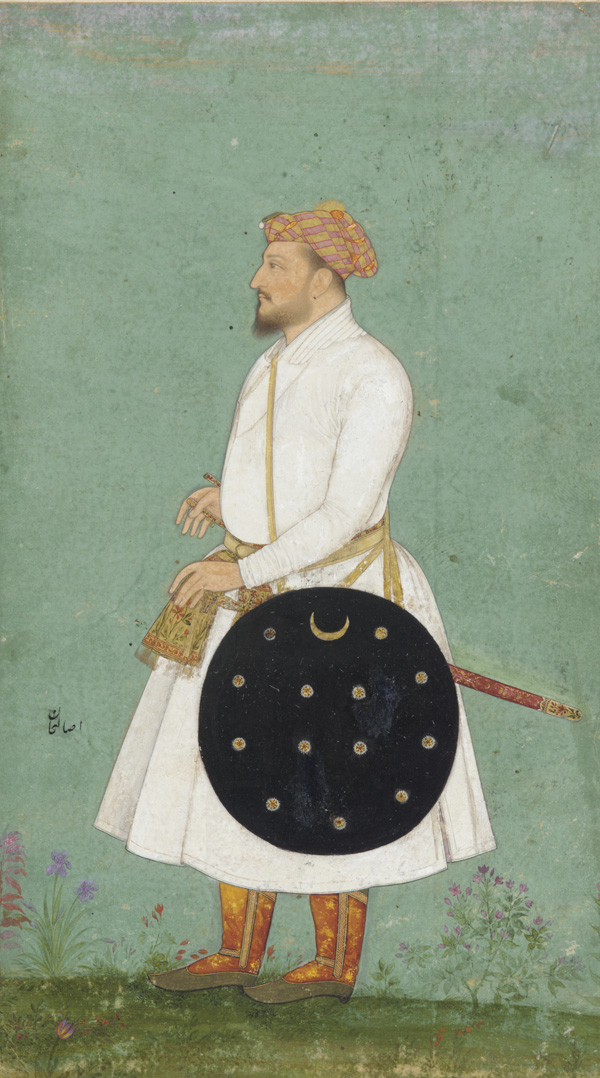
- Portrait of Asalat Khan c. 1645, Smithsonian Institution

Mir Bakhshi of the Mughal Empire
- In office 1644–1647
- Monarch: Shah Jahan

Subahdar of Delhi
- Monarch: Shah Jahan

Personal details
- Born: Mir Abdul Hadi
- Died: 1647
- Relations: Khalilullah Khan (brother)
- Children: Iftikhar Khan (son); Multafat Khan (son)
- Parent: Mir Miran Yazdi (father)

Military service
- Battles/wars: Siege of Parenda; Mughal Central Asia campaign (1645-1647); Battle of Shibarghan (1646)

Mir Abdul Hadi (died 1647), known by the title Asalat Khan, was a noble and general of the Mughal Empire during the reign of Mughal emperor Shah Jahan. He briefly served as the empire's mir bakhshi (paymaster-general), one of the highest positions in the empire's administration. He played key roles in leading Shah Jahan's Central Asian campaign.

== Origins ==
Mir Abdul Hadi was the son of Mir Miran Yazdi, a Persian nobleman with origins in Yazd. Mir Abdul had a younger brother named Khalilullah Khan. Mir Miran fled Persia in 1607 for fear of persecution, finding refuge in Mughal India, but left his son behind. In 1612, a Mughal nobleman named Khan Alam travelled to Persia as an ambassador on behalf of emperor Jahangir; the emperor requested Persia's ruler Shah Abbas I that the ambassador bring Mir Abdul Hadi and his brother back to India. Mir Abdul Hadi accompanied Khan Alam to India in 1618.

== Career ==
Mir Abdul Hadi entered Mughal service towards the end of Jahangir's reign. He received the title of "Asalat Khan" from the next Mughal emperor, Shah Jahan, in 1630. In 1632 he was made the bakhshi (administrator) of the ahadis (royal guard). He served in the Deccan, playing a key role in capturing Bhalki Fort. He then participated in the Mughal siege of Parenda around 1633, for which he was rewarded by being appointed subahdar (governor) of Delhi and Jaunpur. During his governorship of Delhi, Asalat Khan built a bund (dam) at Palam over a stream. The Padshahnama records a hunting retreat of Shah Jahan in 1638, that took place at a park watered by this dam. Asalat Khan was raised to the position of second bakhshi (assistant to the mir bakhshi) in 1639. Between 1641 and 1642, Asalat Khan combated Raja Jagat Singh, as one of the Mughals' three commanders in a campaign against the kingdom of Nurpur; the rebellion was subdued. In 1644, he was promoted to the post of mir bakhshi, making him the chief of military administration in the Mughal Empire; he would serve until 1647.

Around this time, Shah Jahan had stabilised the Mughal position in the northwestern frontier of the empire (modern-day Afghanistan) and cast his sights towards Central Asia, aiming to attack the Uzbeks who had threatened the Mughal hold over Kabul in the past. In October 1645, Shah Jahan instructed Asalat Khan to recruit troops at Kabul, with the intention of using the city as a staging ground for the Central Asian campaigns. He also instructed Asalat Khan to carve an invasion route to Badakhshan by clearing roads and constructing bridges. Soon after military incursions and reconnaissance had started, Asalat Khan led a sixteen-day expedition over the Hindu Kush, seizing livestock and prisoners as retaliation for local rebellion. By July the Mughal army had reached Balkh and captured it with minimal resistance; however, its ruler Nazr Muhammad attempted to escape with his treasure. Asalat Khan pursued and intercepted him at the vicious Battle of Shibarghan (1646), which resulted in Mughal victory in July. Shah Jahan subsequently ordered festivities for eight days, and Asalat Khan's rank was raised to 5000. However, Nazr Muhammad was not captured, and he later escaped to Isfahan.

Asalat Khan died prematurely in the winter of 1647, while still stationed in Balkh for the ongoing Central Asian campaign, from exposure to cold conditions.

== Personal life ==
Asalat Khan owned a haveli (residence) in Agra along the right bank of the Yamuna River, close to the Taj Mahal complex; the structure is not fully preserved. Around 1644, the surgeon Gabriel Boughton joined the service of Asalat Khan in Agra, after the latter requested the East India Company in Surat for a European surgeon. The same surgeon accompanied him to Balkh during his military deployment. Asalat Khan had a son named Iftikhar Khan, a Mughal noble who served the position of akhtah begi (imperial stablemaster) during the reign of Aurangzeb. He also had a son named Multafat Khan.
