= Iftikhar Khan (governor) =

Mughal governor

Iftikhar Khan Sultan Husain
- Subahdar
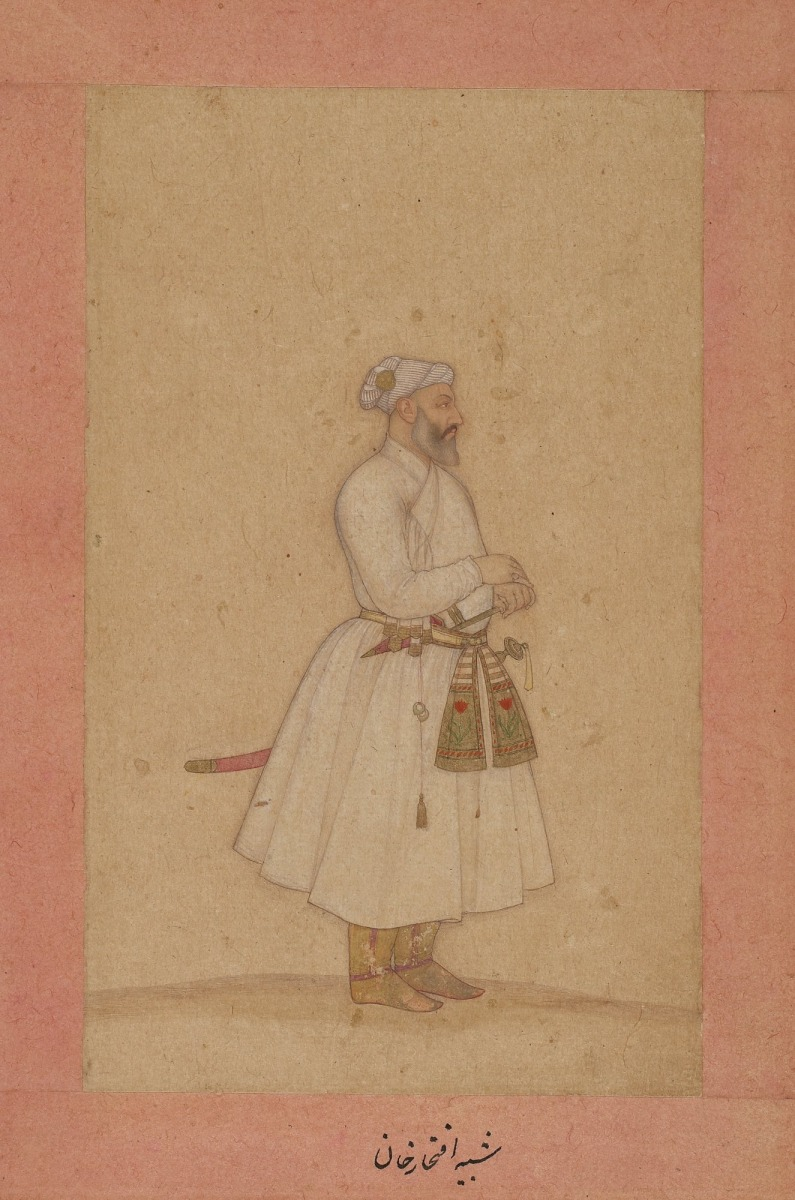
- Painting of Iftikhar Khan containing a Perso-Arabic inscription on the border, ca.1650–1675
- Reign: 1671 – 1675
- Tenure: Governor of Kashmir province
- Father: Asalat Khan

Iftikhar Khan (also spelt as Iftikar Khan), personal name Sultan Husain, was the Mughal governor of the Subah of Kashmir from 1671 to 1675. He was the oldest son of Mir Abdul Hadi, entitled Asalat Khan, who was Mir Bakhshi.

== Governorship of Kashmir ==
He was appointed as governor of the Kashmir province in 1671 and is said to have enacted discriminatory policies, on the orders of Aurangzeb, against the local Hindus of Kashmir, including destruction of Hindu temples, indiscriminate killings, and forced conversions. Many girls and women from the Kashmiri Hindu community were seized for the Islamic harems during his governorship period. His policies pushed the Kashmiri Pundit community to the brink and made an organized group 500-strong from the community seek divine help from Shiva at the Amarnath shrine. According to traditional lore, after the appeal made to Shiva at Amarnath, one of the participating Kashmiri Pundits had a dream of Shiva instructing the group to seek assistance from the ninth Sikh guru, Tegh Bahadur, to put a stop to the oppression. This was taken by the group as a divine sign from Shiva to seek the assistance of the Sikhs. A delegation of around five hundred Kashmiri Pundits, led by Pundit Kirpa Ram, sought the Guru's help at Anandpur Sahib and detailed the genocidal policies enacted against the Hindus of Kashmir under the governorship of Iftikhar Khan.

The genocidal actions against the Kashmiri Hindus during his reign was noted and documented by the Kashmiri historian, Prithivi Nath Kaul Bamzai, in his works.

== Later life ==
His reign as governor of the subah lasted until 1675. Afterwards he was transferred from Kashmir to Peshawar at the time when the Afghans were rebelling. the 1670, he was made faujdar of the Bangash, and, in 1675 he was appointed to the government of Ajmer he was ordered to accompany Prince Muhammad Akbar. In 1679, he was made faujdar of Jaunpur, and he died in 1682. His sons Abdullah, Abdul Hadi and Abdul Baqi were taken in service by Aurangzeb. In the time of Bahadur Shah I, one of them obtained the title of Asalat Khan, and was appointed as the deputy Khan-i-Saman. During this reign he came to the Deccan, where Asaf Jah I welcomed him and made him Diwan of the Deccan. He was also appointed governor of Hyderabad, and died there. Another of his sons, Tafakhur Khan, was the son-in-law of Mamur Khan. In the reign of Farrukhsiyar he became governor of the fort of Bijapur, and he died there.

== Sources ==
- Patwant Singh. The Sikhs (New York: Alfred A. Knopf, 2000) p.45.
