= Mughal currency =

Coinage within the Mughal empire

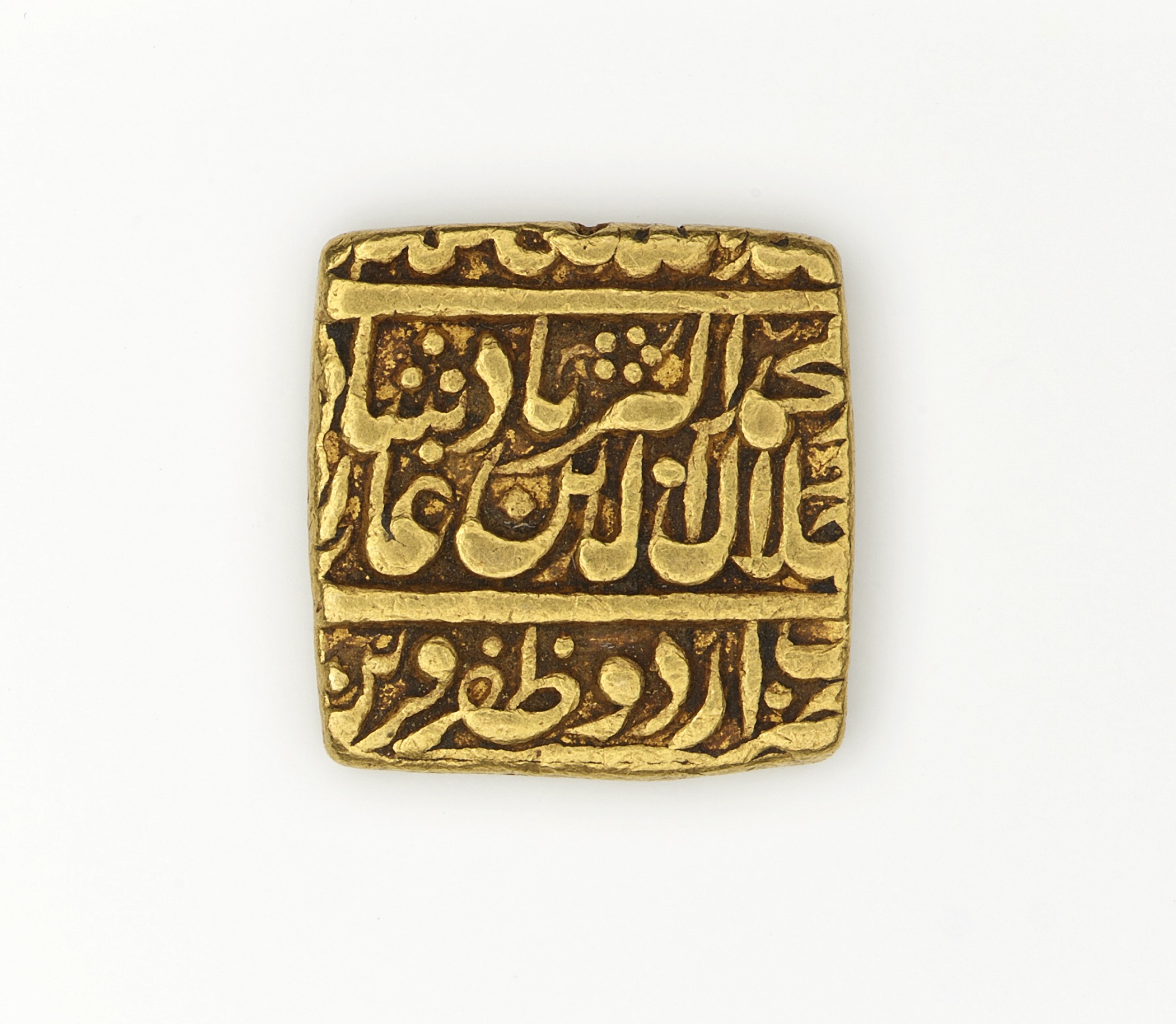
Gold mohur of Akbar

Mughal currency was coinage produced and used within the Mughal empire as well as its associated states.

Despite India having significant gold reserves, the Mughal coins were produced primarily from imported bullion, as a result of the empire's strong export-driven economy, with global demand for Indian agricultural and industrial products drawing a steady stream of precious metals into India.

== Metals ==
The coinage was primarily issued in three metals - gold (mohur), silver (rupya), and copper (dam).

== History ==
=== Babur and Humayun ===
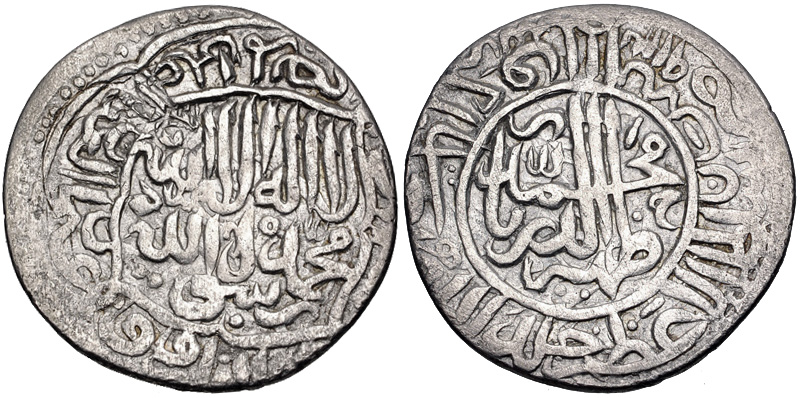
Coin of Babur, as ruler of Kabul

The shahrukhi coins were issued during the reign of the first two emperors, Babur and Humayun.

=== Sur Interregnum ===
The Sur Empire ruled briefly when its founder Sher Shah Suri defeated the emperor Humayun, who then sought refuge in Persia. Sher Shah introduced various reforms in terms of coinage, including the standardization of the mohur (gold), rupee (rupiya, or silver) and dam (or damri made of copper). In 1556, the Mughals regained control of Delhi and Akbar was crowned the new emperor. He adopted the standardizations that had been introduced, and they became a part of Mughal coinage henceforth.

=== Akbar ===
During his reign, Islamic orthodoxy declined, and this culminated in the replacement of Islam as the court religion by Din-i Ilahi, a syncretic religion founded by the emperor himself. This reflected in the coins, and the Islamic creed was replaced with the creed of the new religion. The restriction on the depiction of living beings in coins was also abandoned. Therefore, coins depicting hawks and ducks were issued. A half-mohur with representations of the Hindu gods of Rama and Sita was also issued during this period.

=== Jahangir ===
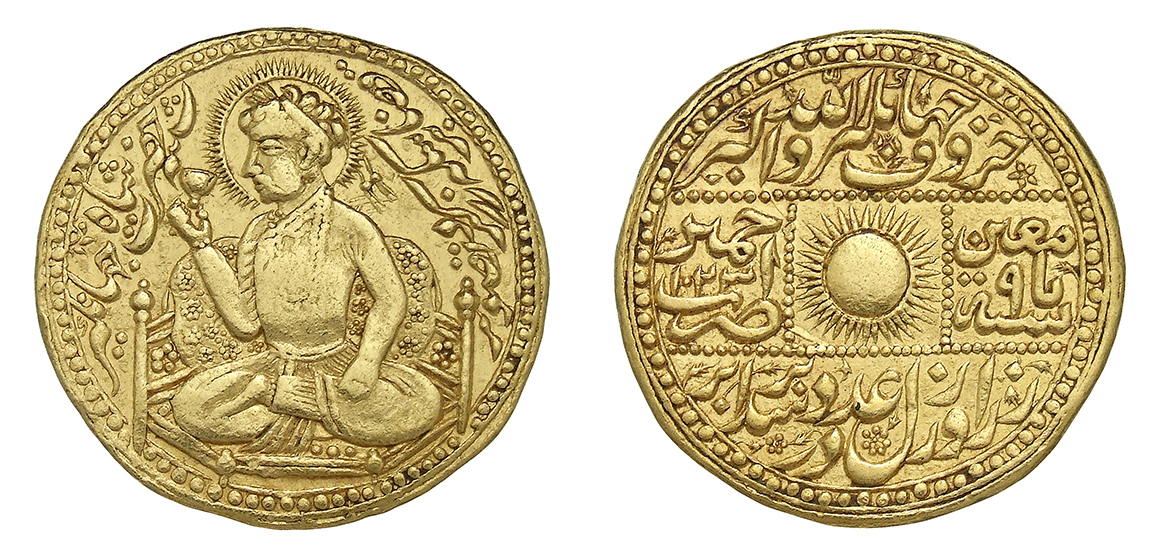
Gold mohur from the reign of Jahangir

The trend of depiction of figures on coins continued during the reign of Akbar's son and successor Jahangir. However, the Ilahi creed was dropped. He issued coins bearing his own portrait, and the portrait of his father Akbar. These portrait mohurs would bear the lion and sun on the reverse. He also issued Zodiac-themed coins, where the Zodiac sign was to correspond with the month of issue.

During his reign, coins were also issued in the name of the empress Nur Jahan. When her son Shah Jahan acceded to the throne, he ordered all such coins to be removed from circulation and melted down.

=== Later rulers ===
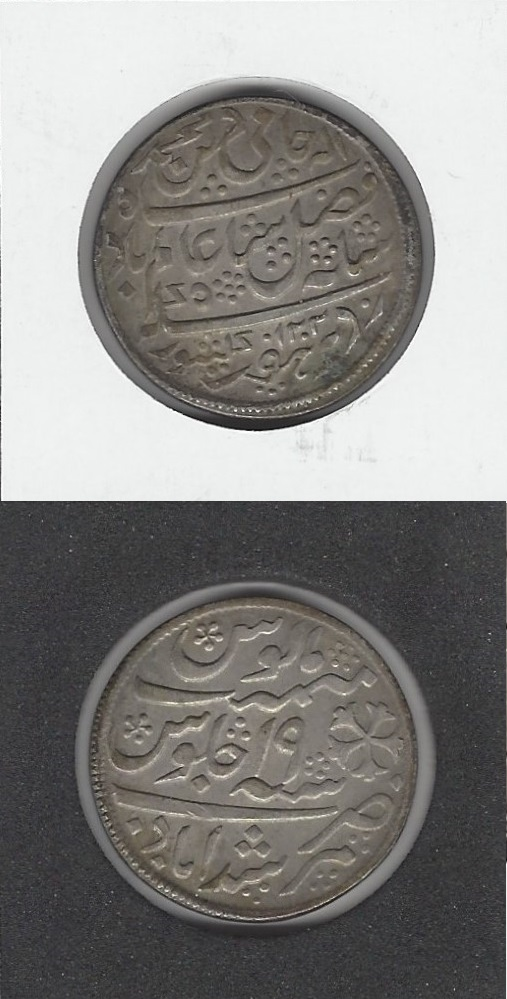
Silver rupee issued by the East India Company in the name of the Mughal emperor Shah Alam II

In 1717, during the reign of Farrukhsiyar, the East India Company was given the right to mint coins in the emperor's name. The company would continue to issue coins in the name of the Mughal emperors until 1835. In 1857, during the Indian rebellion, Bahadur Shah II was crowned the emperor of India and coins were struck in his name. These would be the last Mughal coins to be issued, as he would be deposed and imprisoned, thus ending the reign of the Mughal empire.

== Mints ==
=== List of mints ===
Mughal coins were minted in various locations throughout the empire.

- Itāwa (Itāwā)
- Atak
- Ajmer
- Ujain (Ujainpūr)
- Aḥsanābād (Gulbarga)
- Aḥmadābād
- Aḥmadnagar
- Udaipūr
- Urdū (the Imperial Camp)
  - Urdū Z̤afar Qarīn (the Camp associated with Victory)
  - Urdū dar rāh i Dakhan (the Camp on the road to the Deccan)
- Arkāt (Arcot)
- Islāmābād (uncertain, various locations)
- Isma'īlgarh
- A'z̤amnagar Gokulgarh
- Akbarpūr Tānda
- Akbarnagar
- Āgra (Akbarābād)
- Alwar
- Ilāhābād (Ilāhābās)
- Imtiyāzgarh
- Ānwala (Aonla)
- Awadh (Ak͟htarnagar)
- Aurangābād (K͟hujista Bunyād)
- Elichpūr
- Bālānagargadhā
- Badak͟hshān
- Baroda
- Burhānpūr
- Barelī (Āṣafābād)
- Balwantnagar
- Banāras (Muḥammadābād)
- Bindraban (Mūminābād)
- Bangāla
- Bahādurgarh
- Bahrāich
- Bhakkar
- Bhīlsa
- Bījāpūr
- Bairāta (Berār)
- Bīkāner
- Pānīpat
- Somnath
- Patna ('Āz̤īmābād)
- Purbandar
- Panjnagar
- Peshāwar
- Tatta
- Torgal
- Jālnapūr
- Jaler
- Jammūn
- Jodhpūr
- Jaunpūr
- Jūnāgarh
- Jahāngīrnagar
- Jaipūr
- Chunār
- Champāner
- Chhachraulī
- Chītor
- Chīnāpatan
- Ḥasanābād
- Ḥiṣār
- Ḥaidarābād
- K͟hairpūr
- Dogāoṇ
- Daulatābād
- Dehlī (Shāhjahānābād)
- Dera
- Derajat
- Deogarh
- Dewal Bandar
- Ravishnagar Sāgar
- Zainu-L-Bilād
- Sironj
- Sarhind (Sahrind)
- Sa'dnagar
- Samarqand
- Sind
- Sūrat
- Sahāranpūr
- Sītpur
- Sīkākul
- Sholāpūr
- Sherpūr
- Shergarh
- Z̤afarābād
- Z̤afarpūr
- Z̤afarnagar
- 'Ālamgīrpūr
- Fatḥpūr
- Farruk͟hābād (Aḥmadnagar)
- Fīrozgarh
- Qandahār
- Qanauj
- Kābul
- Kālpī
- Katak
- Karīmābād
- Kashmīr (Srīnagar)
- Korā
- Khambāyat (Cambay)
- Gulkanda (Golconda)
- Gwāliār (Gwalior)
- Gobindpūr
- Gorakhpur (Mu'az̤z̤amābād)
- Gokulgarh
- Lāhor
- Lakhnau (Lucknow)
- Lahrī Bandar
- Mālpūr
- Mathurā (Islāmābād)
- Macchlīpatan (Masulipatam)
- Muḥammadābād
- Muḥammadnagar
- Murādābād
- Murshidābād (Mak͟hṣūṣābād)
- Muṣtafa-ābād
- Muz̤affargarh
- Maliknagar
- Mulhārnagar
- Mumbai
- Mandū
- Mahindrapūr
- Mahīsor (Mysore)
- Mailāpūr
- Nārnol
- Nāgor
- Najafgarh
- Najībābād
- Narwar
- Nuṣratābād
- Hāthras
- Hardwār
