= William Hedges (colonial administrator) =

British colonial governor (1632–1701)

Sir William Hedges (21 October 1632 – 6 August 1701) was an English merchant and the first governor (1681–1683) of the East India Company (EIC) in Bengal. In later life, his positions included joint sheriff of London for 1694.

== Life and career ==
He was born in Coole in County Cork, Ireland, the eldest son of Robert and Catharine Hedges. The Hedges had their roots in Wiltshire, and had originally gone by the surname of Lacy.

Details of Hedges' early career are unclear, but it is known that he went to Turkey as a trader for the Levant Company. In his diaries, he refers to his knowledge of colloquial Turkish and Arabic. Initially posted to the trading station (or factory) in Smyrna, by 1668 he had risen to the position of company treasurer in Constantinople. It is alleged, however, that the demands of this position became too much for him. Having arranged for a replacement from Smyrna, he quit Turkey and returned to England around 1670–71.

In London, Hedges involved himself in a variety of ventures. He joined The Mercers' Company, supreme among the City's livery companies. He invested £500 in the recently reformed Royal African Company. He served two stints as a Levant Company assistant. From 1677 to 1680, he was a councilman for his local ward of Bassishaw. He was Colonel of the Green Regiment, London Trained Bands, in 1697.

Through his first marriage, Hedges had also aligned himself with London's dissenting Protestant movement. His brother-in-law and fellow merchant Jeremy Sambrooke was to become a leading dissenter. Hedges took part in the campaign against the Conventicle Act that forbade religious assemblies of more than five people outside the auspices of the Church of England. In the end, however, Hedges returned to the Anglican church.

=== India ===
Nearly a decade later, Hedges got his East India Company posting. At the time, the Company's commercial interests in Bengal were managed from Fort St. George in Madras, more than 800 miles down the coast. However, this arrangement was proving inadequate. Business in Bengal was expanding steadily, but at the same time the Company's interests were increasingly under threat from native rulers as well as from commercial parties keen on breaking its trade monopoly in that part of India. Further, there were rumblings against the management in Madras and accusations of dishonesty against the Company's own officials.

The Court of Directors therefore decided that the Bengal station needed more autonomy to cope with its various challenges, and created a separate Agency for the province. Hedges had already been elected as one of the Company's 24 directors in April 1681. On 3 September of that year, he was appointed the first chief agent and governor of the new Bengal Agency. He was instructed to put a stop to the growing exactions of the native rulers and their subordinates, to check the recently organised efforts of the 'interlopers' to break through the EIC's monopoly, and to punish the dishonesty of many of the company's own servants. In particular, he was to arrest his predecessor, Matthias Vincent.

Hedges sailed from the Downs on 28 January 1682, anchored in Balasore Road on 17 July, and reached Hoogly on 24 July. His want of tact and prudence brought him into constant collision with his associates in the council at Hoogly, especially with Job Charnock, John Beard, and Francis Ellis, and in the end they proved too strong for him. His detention of Beard's letter to Sir Josiah Child, the contents of which he had contrived to know, subjected him to the ill-will of the latter.

When he attempted to capture Matthias Vincent, the latter, aware that he was about to be taken prisoner, appeared with a party of well-armed soldiers and forced Hedges to retreat to the Dutch settlement of Chinsurah, further inland. Vincent's position was further strengthened by the arrival of his protégé Thomas "Diamond" Pitt with more men.

=== Return to England ===
On 21 December 1683, the EIC court issued a formal revocation of Hedges' commission, which reached him on 17 July 1684. He accordingly left Hoogly, embarked on 30 December, visited Persia on his way, and landed at Dover on 4 April 1687. On 6 March 1688, he was knighted by James II, and became a member of The Mercers' Company.

On 26 May 1690, he, together with Thomas Cook, was put forward by the church party as a candidate for the shrievalty of the City of London, but neither won. In June 1693 he was chosen sheriff along with Alderman Thomas Abney. A month later he was elected alderman for Portsoken ward. In 1694 he was chosen as one of the twenty-four directors of the 'New Bank' (Bank of England), and four or five years later resumed to a certain extent his connection with the East India Company.

In 1698, the old company formed a 'grand committee' of twenty-six gentlemen associated with the twenty-six of their court to deal with certain resolutions hostile to their interests that had been passed by the Commons on 24 May. A similar committee was again formed in January 1699, and of this last, Hedges and Sir John Letheuillier were members. The two were deputed on 17 January of that year to open negotiations for a coalition with the new company. In 1700 Hedges was a candidate for the mayoralty, but was not successful.

He died in London on 5 August 1701, and was buried, as directed in his will, with his first wife at Stratton St Margaret, Wiltshire, on the 15th. Their tomb can be seen in St Margaret's churchyard.

== Personal life ==
He was twice married. His first wife, Susanna, eldest daughter of Nicholas Vanacker of Erith, Kent, died in childbirth at Hoogly on 6 July 1683, leaving two sons, William and Robert, and a daughter, Susanna. He married as his second wife, on 21 July 1687, Anne, widow of Colonel John Searle of Finchley, and by her had two sons, John and Charles.

In 1693, Hedges bought land to the value of £200 in Stratton St Margaret in Wiltshire, and settled it for an augmentation of the vicarage and better maintenance of the vicar and vicars' widows forever. He also directed that a sermon on charity should be preached annually by the vicar 'the next Sunday to the sixth of July,' the day of his first wife's death. The sermon is suspended, though the endowment continues.

== Sources ==
- Yule, Henry, ed. (1887). The diary of William Hedges, esq. (afterwards Sir William Hedges), during his agency in Bengal : as well as on his voyage out and return overland (1681–1697) (Volume 1). London: Hakuyt Society.
- Yule, Henry, ed. (1888). The diary of William Hedges, esq. (afterwards Sir William Hedges), during his agency in Bengal : as well as on his voyage out and return overland (1681–1697) (Volume 2). London: Hakuyt Society.
- Yule, Henry, ed. (1889). The diary of William Hedges, esq. (afterwards Sir William Hedges), during his agency in Bengal : as well as on his voyage out and return overland (1681–1697) (Volume 3). London: Hakuyt Society.

Preceded by none	Chief Agent and Governor of Bengal Agency; 1681–1684	Succeeded by John Beard
