= William Hamilton (surgeon) =

William Hamilton (died 4 December 1717) was a Scottish surgeon, associated with British East India Company (EIC), who travelled to India in the first half of the eighteenth century. He was a part of the delegation that went from Calcutta, the base of the company, to meet Mughal emperor Farrukhsiyar in his court in Delhi in 1715.

== Early life ==
William Hamilton was born in Lanarkshire in the latter part of the seventeenth century, and possibly studied at University of Glasgow. He travelled with the East India Company on the Sherborne in 1709, but deserted it at Cuddalore. After finding his way to Madras, he was summoned back to the ship, but he absconded to Calcutta.

== Treatment of Farrukhsiyar ==
In Delhi, Hamilton first had to treat Taqarab Khan (the khansama, or lord steward). In August 1715, the surgeon was called to treat a swelling in the groin of the Emperor Farrukhsiyar, which he treated successfully. In October of the same year, the emperor again suffered from violent pain and feared it would be a fistula. Hamilton's treatment was again successful. As a result, in December 1715 Farrukhsiyar finally arranged his marriage to Indira Kanwar, the daughter of Raja Ajit Singh of Jodhpur, which had been delayed by his recurrent illness.

== Royal gift to Hamilton ==
Hamilton was generously rewarded on the occasion of the wedding. He received "an elephant, a horse, five thousand rupees in money, two diamond rings, a jewelled aigrette, a set of gold buttons, and models of all his instruments in gold."

== The Farman ==
More important than these personal rewards to Hamilton was what the British East India Company achieved. The company's delegation was placed in high regard in the royal court of Farrukhsiyar. In April 1717, the emperor's farman (grant) was issued, meeting all the requests that the company had made in its petitions. Permission was granted to purchase 38 villages surrounding the three already held by the company (Sutanuti, Gobindapur and Kalikata, the predecessor of modern Calcutta). The company was also granted trading privileges in Bengal and further fortification of Calcutta. This grant was instrumental in the setting up of business and the colonisation of Bengal, later to be followed by the rest of India, by the East India Company.

== Farrukhsiyar's wish to retain Hamilton ==
After the grant, Farrukhsiyar expressed his wish to retain Hamilton in Delhi as his personal physician, but Hamilton was unwilling to stay. Hamilton promised to the emperor that after a visit to Europe he would return and join him as his personal physician.

== Death ==
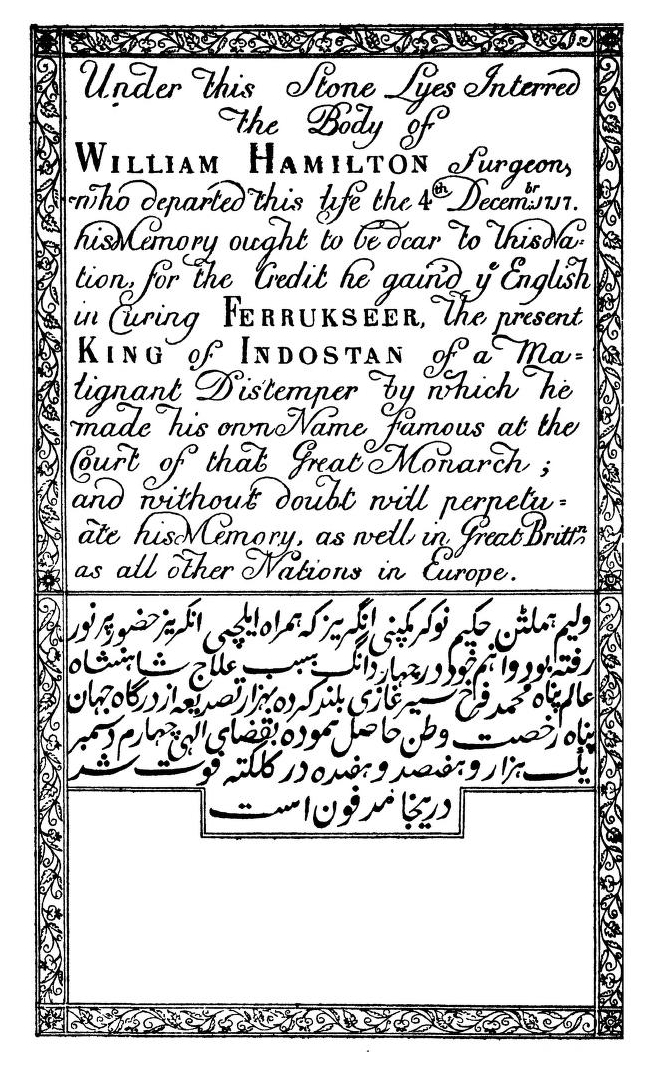
Grave inscription

Hamilton died in Calcutta on [4 December] 1717. He was buried at the churchyard of St. John's Church, Calcutta. The inscription tells the story of his curing a "Malignant Distemper" of Farrukhsiyar.

Under this Stone lyes interred

the Body of
"William Hamilton, Surgeon,
Who departed this life 4 December 1717.
His memory ought to be dear to his
Nation for the credit he gain'd the English
in curing Ferrukseer, the present
King of Indostan, of a
Malignant Distemper, by which he
made his own Name famous at the
Court of that Great Monarch;
and without doubt will perpetuate
his memory, as well in Great Britain

as all other Nations of Europe."

— Inscription stone on the tomb of William Hamilton, 1717

== See also ==
- Gabriel Boughton
