= Mughal Kashmir =

Province of the Mughal Empire

Sarkar of Kashmir; Subah of Kashmir
- 1586–1752
- Alam flag of the Mughal Empire

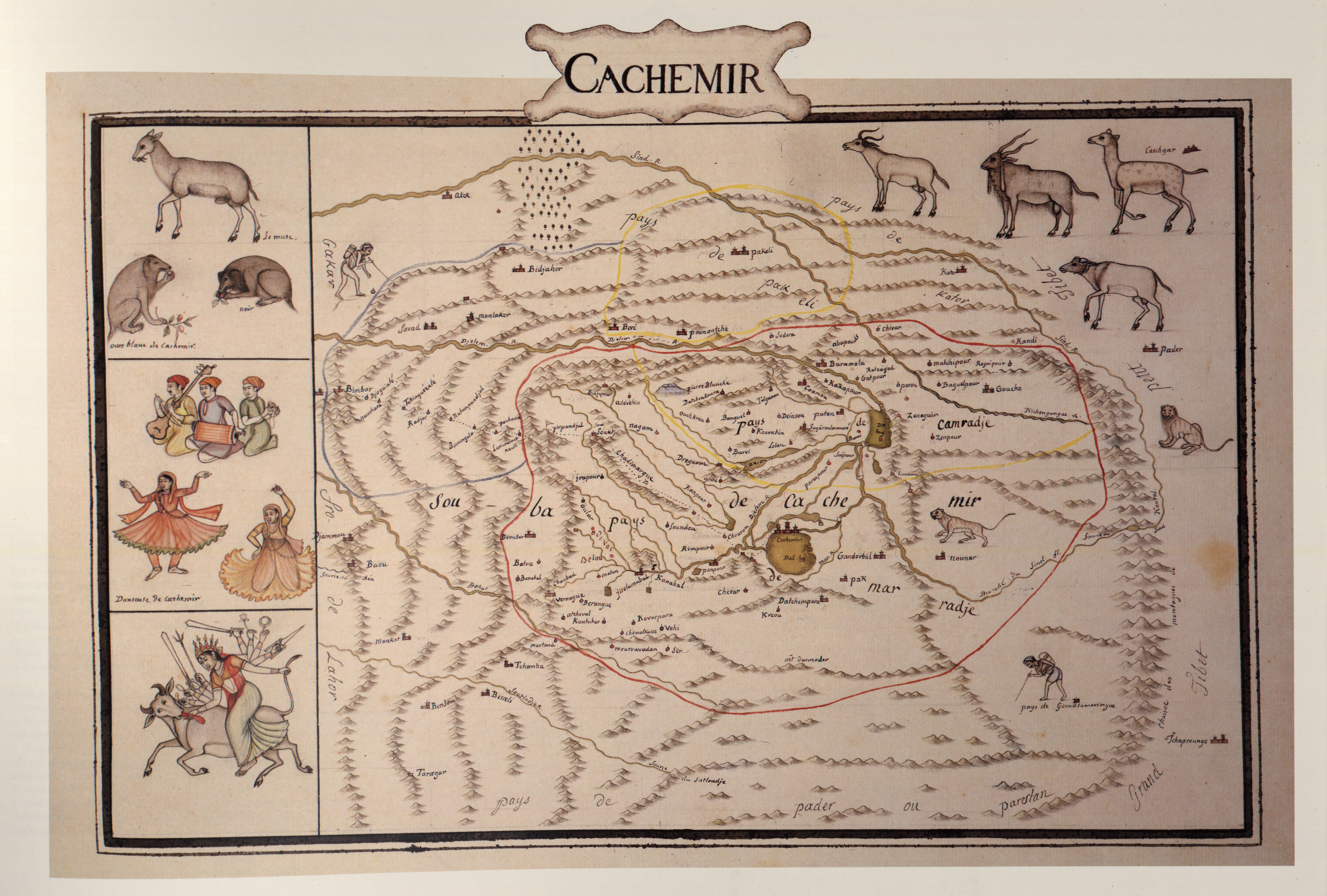
- Elaborately illustrated map of the Kashmir Subah of the Mughal Empire, commissioned by Jean Baptiste Joseph Gentil, ca.1770
- Status: Sarkar of the Kabul Subah of Mughal Empire–(1586–1648); Subah of the Mughal Empire–(1648–1752)
- Capital: Srinagar
- Common languages: Persian (official); Kashmiri (official); Arabic (religious); Hindustani (lingua franca)
- Religion: Sunni Islam (official); Shia Islam; Hinduism and other Indian religions
- Demonym: Kashmiri
- Government: Dependent later self governing viceroyalty under Mughal Empire: Faujdari with a divisional government under Kabul authority (1586–1648); Subahdari with a provincial government (1648–1752)
- Faujdar/Subahdar
  - 1586–1588: Qasim Khan
  - 1611–1616: Ahmed Beg Khan
  - 1638–1646 1652–1657: Ali Mardan Khan
  - 1671–1675: Iftikhar Khan
  - 1721–1723: Abd al-Samad Khan
  - 1751–1752: Quli Khan
- Legislature: Mughal Darbar
- Historical era: Early modern period
  - Battle of Hastivanj: 10 October 1586
  - Annexed by Durrani Empire: 1752

Area
  - 1601: 11,229 sq mi (29,080 km^{2})
- Currency: Gold Mohur; Silver Rupiya; Copper Dam
Preceded by	Succeeded by
Kashmir Sultanate	Durrani Empire
- Today part of: India; Pakistan

The Sarkar of Kashmir (Persian: سرکار کشمیر), later the Subah of Kashmir (Persian: صوبہ کشمیر), was a province of the Mughal Empire encompassing the Kashmir region, now divided between Pakistan (Muzaffarabad division) and India (Kashmir division). It was separated from the Kabul Subah and was made into an imperial province under administrative reforms carried out by emperor Shah Jahan in 1648. The province ceased to exist when Durrani forces, under Ahmed Shah Abdali, entered Kashmir in 1752 and captured Quli Khan, the last Mughal Subahdar.

== Geography ==
The Kashmir Subah was bordered on the north by the Maqpon Kingdom of Baltistan, to the east by the Namgyal Kingdom of Ladakh, to the west by the Kabul Subah, the south by Lahore Subah, and to the south east by the semi autonomous hill states of Jammu.

== List of governors ==
- Qasim Khan (1586–1587)
- Mirza Yusuf Khan Rizvi (1587–1593)
- Asaf Khan (1593–1599)
- Khan Qulich Kulbah Khan (r. 1606–1609)
- Ahmad Beg Khan (r. 1611–1618)
- Zaffar Khan (r. 1633–1640)
- Ali Mardan Khan (r. 1642, 1650–1657)
- Itimad Khan (1659–1662)
- Ibrahim Khan (1662–1664)
- Islam Khan (1664–1665)
- Saif Khan (r. 1664–1667)
- Mubarez Khan (r. 1667–1668)
- Saif Khan (1669–1672)
- Iftikhar Khan (r. 1671–1675)
- Qawamuddin Khan (1675–1678)
- Ibrahim Khan (1678–1685)
- Hifzullah Khan (r. 1686–1690)
- Muzafer Khan (r. 1690–1692)
- Fazal Khan (r. 1698–1701)
- Ibrahim Khan (r. 1701–1706)
- Inayatullah Kashmiri (r. 1712–unknown)
- Mir Ahmad Khan (r. unknown–1720)
- Abdul Samad (r. 1720–1723)
- Fakar-ud-Daula
- Ati Ullah Khan (r. 1739–1741)
- Quli Khan (r. unknown–1752)
