= John Beard (colonial administrator) =

Businessman

- Died: 1685; Hooghly
- Occupation: Colonial Administrator
- Known for: President of Bengal; Author of early account of Gabriel Boughton

John Beard (died 1685) was an administrator of the English East India Company. He served as the Chief Agent and President of Bengal in the late seventeenth century.

Beard wrote one of the earliest accounts of the legend of Gabriel Boughton. He died in Hooghly in 1685.

Political offices
Preceded by William Hedges	Chief Agent of Bengal; 17 July 1684 – 1685	Succeeded by Job Charnock
