= Abdul Hamid Lahori =

17th-century historian

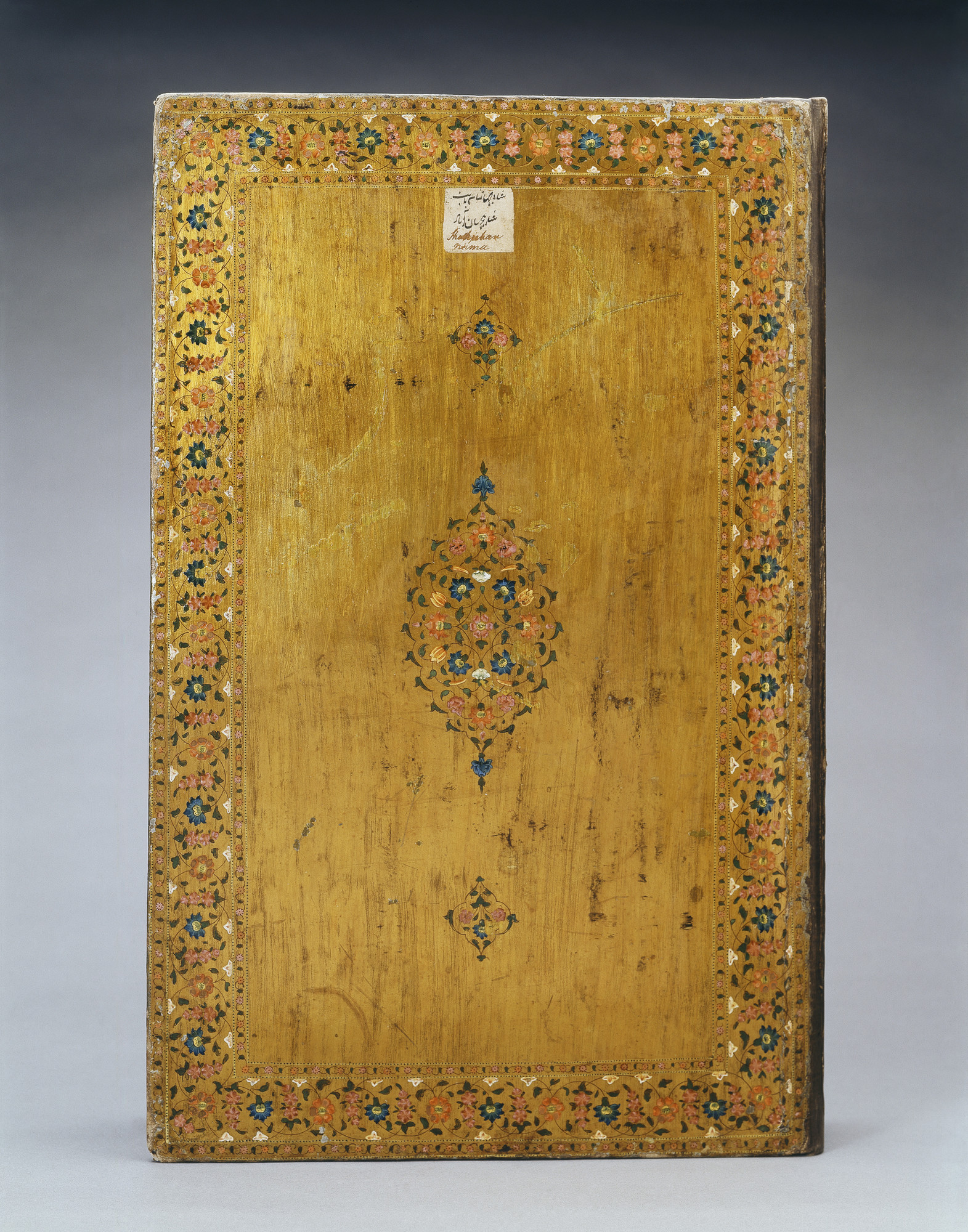
- The cover of the Windsor Padshahnama, written by Abdul Hamid Lahori
- Born: Lahore, Punjab, Mughal Empire
- Died: 14 May 1654
- Occupation: Historian
- Years active: 17th century
- Notable work: Padshahnama

ʿAbd al-Ḥamīd Lāhūrī (Persian: عبدالحمید لاہوری; died 14 May 1654) was a 17th-century traveller and historian during the reign of Mughal Emperor Shah Jahān who later became a court historian for the emperor. He wrote the Pādshāh-nāma, the official chronicle of the Shah Jahān's reign. He has described Shah Jahān's life and activities during the first twenty years of his reign in this book in great detail. Infirmities of old age prevented him from proceeding with the third decade, which was later chronicled by Muḥammad Wārith, his pupil.

== Biography ==
Not much is known about the biographical details of ʿAbd al-Ḥamīd Lāhūrī, except that he was a Punjabi Muslim born and raised in Lahore, hence his nisbah Lāhūrī.

A brief collection of ʿAbd al-Ḥamīd's letters with his prolegomenon is considered his early work. In his advanced age, ʿAbd al-Ḥamīd retired to Patna, from where he was summoned by Shah Jahān to write official chronicle of his reign on the recommendation of his grand vizier Nawab Saʿdallāh Khan, as emperor wanted someone who could emulate the style of Akbar-nāma of Abū l-Faḍl which he greatly admired. ʿAbd al-Ḥamīd commenced his work in 1642, and completed first two volumes by 1648. Old age compelled him to cease writing and entrust remaining work to his student Muḥammad Wārith (d. 1680), who completed the Pādshāh-nāma. He died on 14 May 1654, as recorded by Amal-i Salih of Moḥammad Ṣāleḥ Kanbōh, another court writer.

== Taj Mahal ==
Taj Mahal, the world-renowned monument was built and completed by the end of 1653 or early 1654 in the 17th-century. Therefore, the 350th anniversary of Taj Mahal actually occurred around 1994. More than 20,000 workers toiled for years to build the majestic Taj Mahal with four slender minarets. It was built by the heartbroken Mughal emperor Shah Jahān in memory of his second wife, Empress Momtāz Maḥall, who had died in childbirth. Shah Jahān's official chronicler ʿAbd al-Ḥamīd writes that the construction began six months after Empress Momtāz Maḥall's death which was on 17 June 1631.

ʿAbd al-Ḥamīd also calls the glass pieces of the Sheesh Mahal of the Agra Fort as glass pieces "Shish-i-Halebi" because Haleb is the Arabic name of Aleppo (Syria) which was the main centre for manufacturing these glass pieces. To build a strong foundation of this grand mausoleum known as the Taj Mahal, a network of wells was laid down along the river line and the wells were filled with stones and other solid materials.

== Works ==
- Lahori, Abdul Hamid (1868). Badshahnamah of Lahori, Vol. 1 (Original text). College Press Calcutta.
- Lahori, Abdul Hamid (1868). Badshahnamah of Lahori, Vol. 2, Bibliotheca Indica (Original text). College Press Calcutta.
- Lahori, Abdul Hamid; tr. by Henry Miers Elliot (1875). Badshanama of Abdul Hamid Lahori. Hafiz Press, Lahore.
- Bádsháh-Náma of 'Abdu-L Hamíd Láhorí Packard Humanities Institute
