= Anwala =

- village
- Location within Madhya Pradesh Location within India
- Coordinates: 23.1207714°N 77.2922332°E
- Country: India
- State: Madhya Pradesh
- District: Bhopal
- Tehsil: Huzur
- Elevation: 545 m (1,788 ft)

Population (2011)
  - Total: 1,200
- Time zone: UTC+5:30 (IST)
- ISO 3166 code: MP-IN
- 2011 census code: 482504

Anwala is a village in the Bhopal district of Madhya Pradesh, India. It is located in the Huzur tehsil and the Phanda block.

== Demographics ==
According to the 2011 census of India, Anwala has 209 households. The effective literacy rate (i.e. the literacy rate of population excluding children aged 6 and below) is 64.48%.

Demographics (2011 Census)
	Total	Male	Female
Population	1200	641	559
Children aged below 6 years	178	93	85
Scheduled caste	332	179	153
Scheduled tribe	319	169	150
Literates	659	407	252
Workers (all)	440	312	128
Main workers (total)	422	307	115
Main workers: Cultivators	360	260	100
Main workers: Agricultural labourers	42	32	10
Main workers: Household industry workers	0	0	0
Main workers: Other	20	15	5
Marginal workers (total)	18	5	13
Marginal workers: Cultivators	13	2	11
Marginal workers: Agricultural labourers	3	2	1
Marginal workers: Household industry workers	0	0	0
Marginal workers: Others	2	1	1
Non-workers	760	329	431
