= Padshahnama =

17th-century Indian history

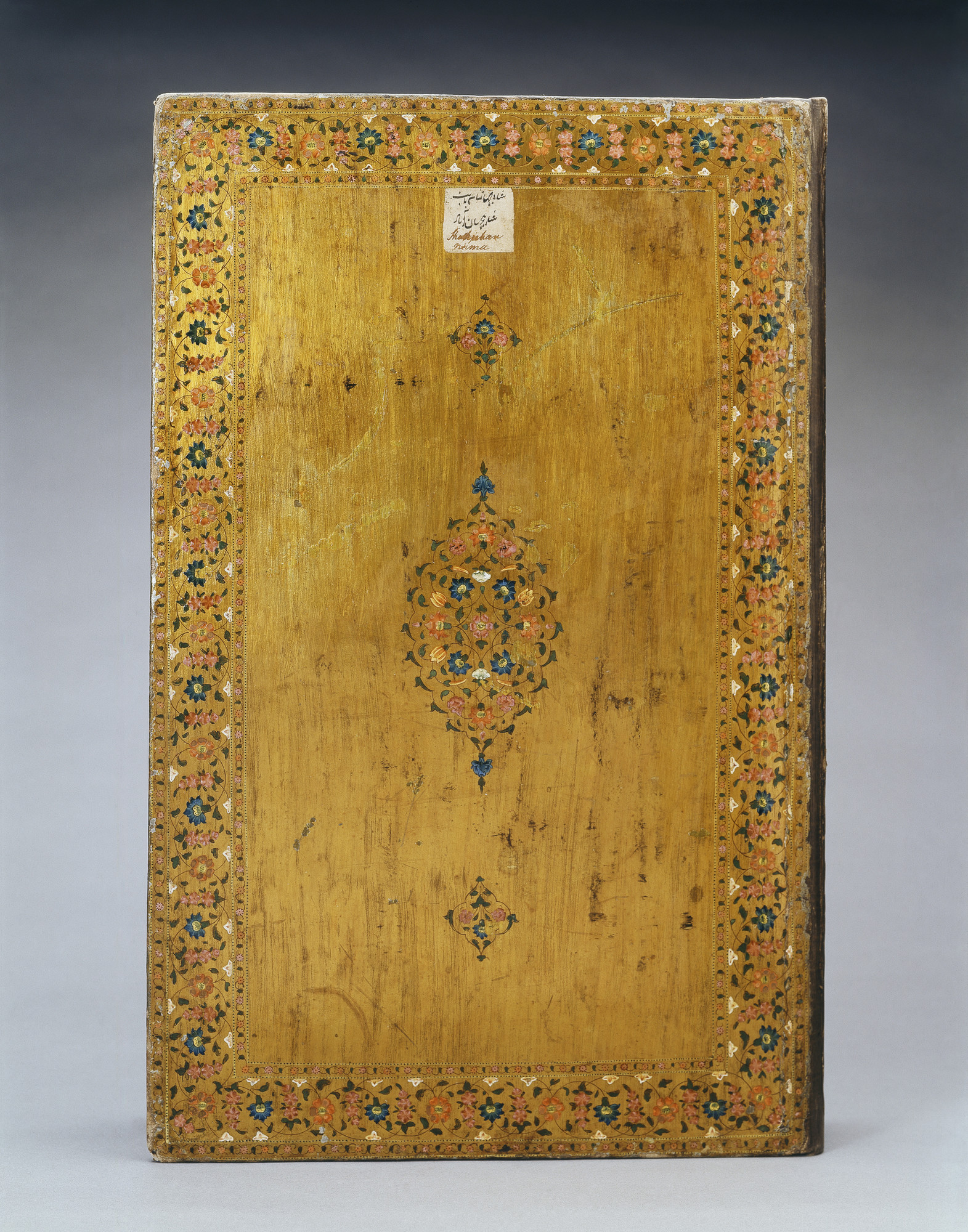
- The cover of the Windsor Padshahnama
- Author: Muhammad Amin Qazvini; Jalaluddin Tabatabai; Abdul Hamid Lahori
- Language: Persian
- Genre: Biography
- Set in: 17th century Mughal India
- Publisher: Muhammad Waris
- Publication date: 1630–1637
- Publication place: Mughal Empire (India)
- Text: Padshahnama at Wikisource

Padshahnama or Padshah Nama (Persian: پادشاهنامه or پادشاه‌نامه; lit. 'The Book of the Emperor') is a group of works written as the official history of the reign of the Mughal Emperor Shah Jahan I. Unillustrated texts are known as Shahjahannama, with Padshahnama used for the illustrated manuscript versions. These works are among the major sources of information about Shah Jahan's reign. Lavishly illustrated copies were produced in the imperial workshops, with many Mughal miniatures. Although military campaigns are given the most prominence, the illustrations and paintings in the manuscripts of these works illuminate life in the imperial court, depicting weddings and other activities.

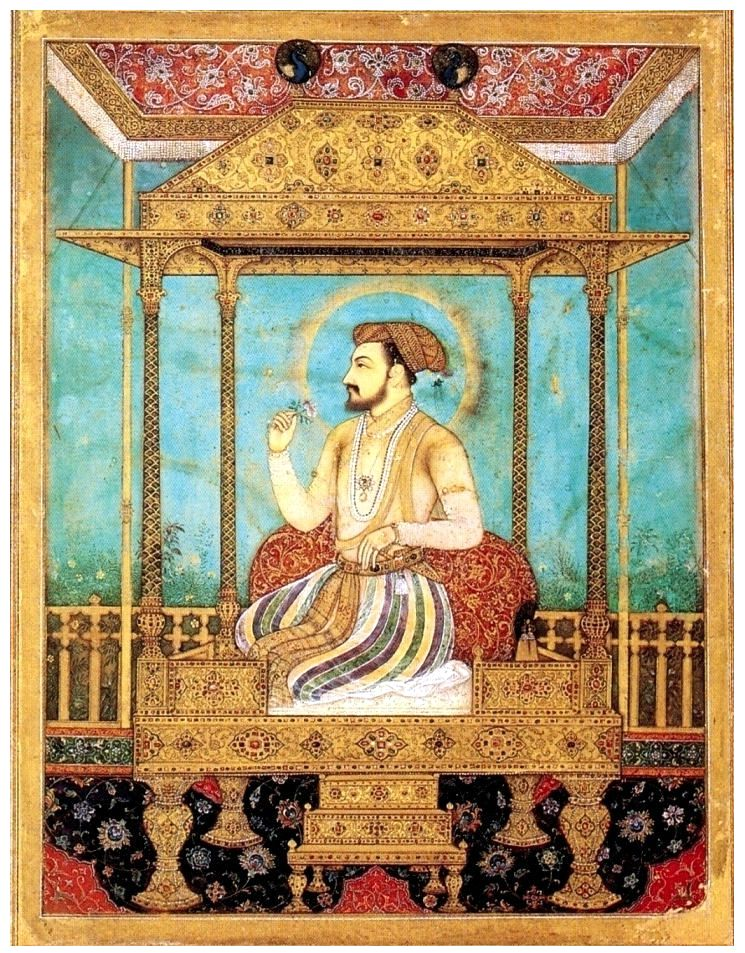
Portrait of Emperor Shah Jahan I on the Peacock Throne

The most significant work of this genre was written by Abdul Hamid Lahori, the pupil of Akbar's biographer Abdul Fazal, in two volumes. He could not write the third volume of this genre because of the infirmities of old age.

== History ==
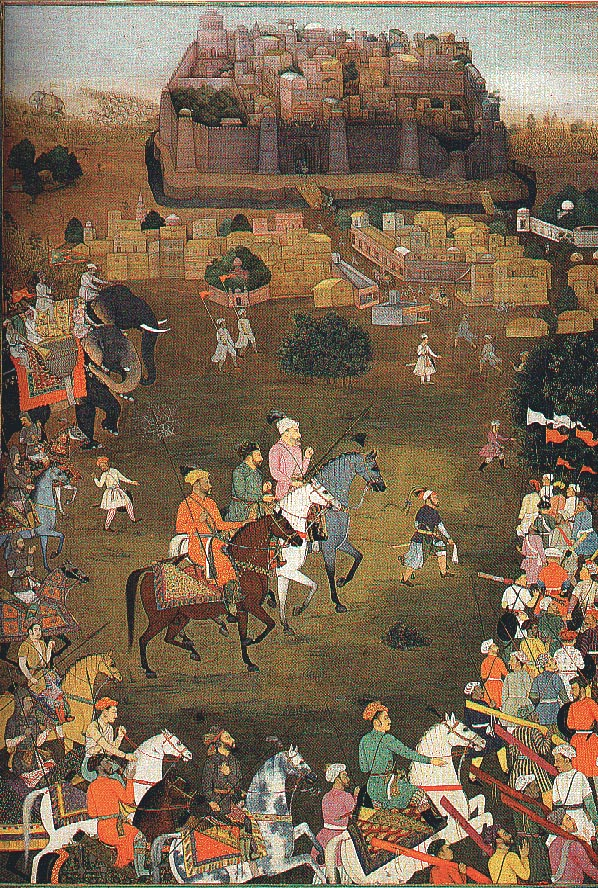
The Mughal Army led by Prince Aurangzeb, Syed Khan-i-Jahan, Abdullah Khan Bahadur Firuz Jang and Khan Dauran enter Orchha.

Shah Jahan in his eighth regnal year asked Muhammad Amin Qazvini to write an official history of his reign and he completed his Padshahnama in 1636, which covers the first ten (lunar) years of Shah Jahan’s reign.

Jalaluddin Tabatabai wrote another Padshahnama, but the extant portion of the text covers only four years, from fifth to eighth regnal year of the emperor. The project was later given to Abdul Hamid Lahori, who wrote his Padshahnama in two volumes. The first volume of this work is based upon Qazvini’s work but has more details. The second volume covers the next ten (lunar) years of Shah Jahan’s reign. He completed his work in 1648. Lahori died in 1654. Muhammad Waris, a pupil of Lahori was given the responsibility to complete the task and his Padshahnama (completed in 1656) covers the rest of the period of Shah Jahan’s reign. His work was published by the Asiatic Society as the third volume of the Padshahnama of Lahori.

== Extant manuscripts ==
In 1799, Saadat Ali Khan II, the Nawab of Awadh in northern India, sent the Padshahnama, to King George III of Great Britain. Today, the imperial illustrated manuscript of the Padshahnama of Lahori is preserved in the Royal Library at Windsor Castle, and is known as the Windsor Padshahnama. It was produced between 1630 and 1657 and contains 44 miniatures, some full page narrative scenes of battles, court ceremonies and other events (11 are across two pages), and some smaller individual portraits, surrounded by geometric decoration. These illustrate the genealogy of the Mughal dynasty which begins the work. The page size is 58.6 x 36.8 cm, and 13 different lead artists worked on the volume. In 1994, while the volume was being rebound for conservation reasons, the opportunity was taken to tour all the miniatures in an exhibition that was shown in New Delhi, the Queen's Gallery in London, and six American cities.

Manuscripts of the Padshahnamas of Qazvini and Waris are preserved in the British Library. The original manuscript of the Padshahnama that depicts the complete reign of Shah Jahan is preserved in Khuda Bakhsh Oriental Library, Patna, India.

Other individual miniatures are held in a number collections. The Khalili Collection of Islamic Art has one miniature in which Shah Jahan and his court watch two elephants fighting. There were some later illustrated manuscript copies made; for example the Metropolitan Museum of Art in New York has miniatures from 17th-century versions, and the Los Angeles County Museum of Art from one of around 1800.

== Context ==
The Padshahnama fits into a tradition of imperial autobiographies or official court biographies, seen in various parts of the world. In South Asia these go back to the Ashokavadana and Harshacharita from ancient India, and the medieval Prithviraj Raso. The Mughals' ancestor Timur had been celebrated in a number of works, mostly called Zafarnama ("Book of Victories"), such as those by Shami and Yazdi. The latter is the best known, and was also produced in an illustrated copy in the 1590s by Akbar's workshop. The tradition was continued by the Mughals with the Baburnama (autobiography, not illustrated before Akbar), Akbarnama (biography), and Tuzk-e-Jahangiri or Jahangir-nameh (memoirs of Jahangir).

== Gallery ==
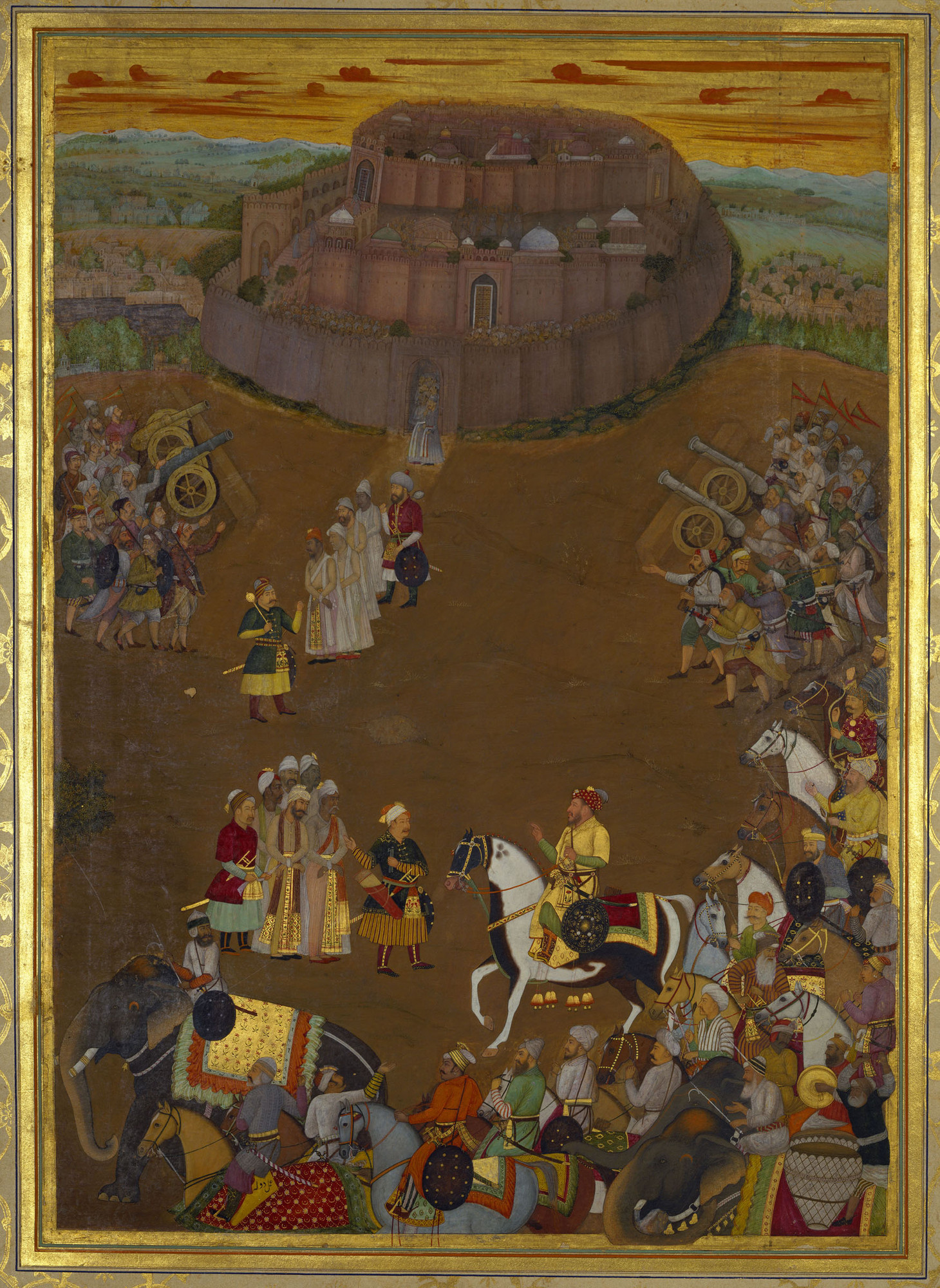
The Mughal commander Khan Dauran captures the Fort at Udgir.

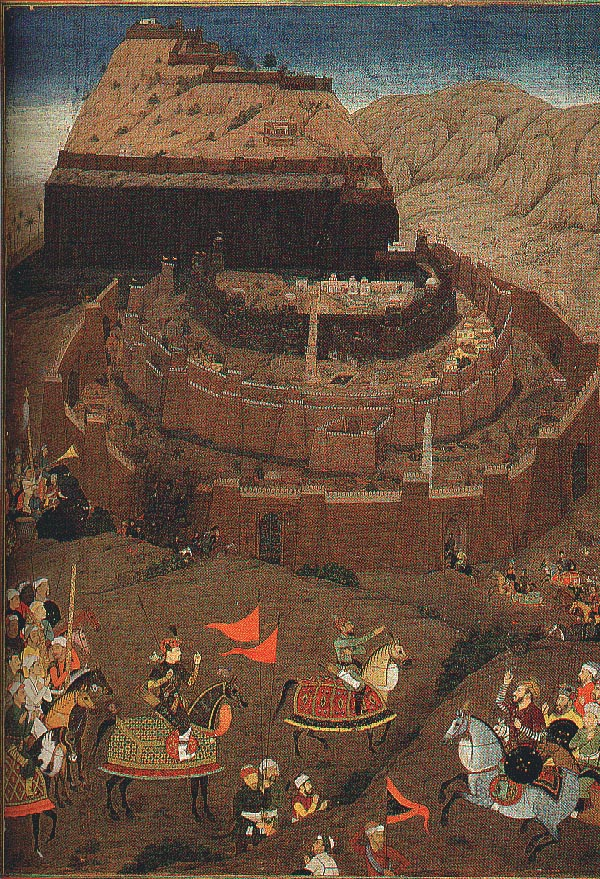
The Mughal Army captures Daulatabad fort in the year 1633.

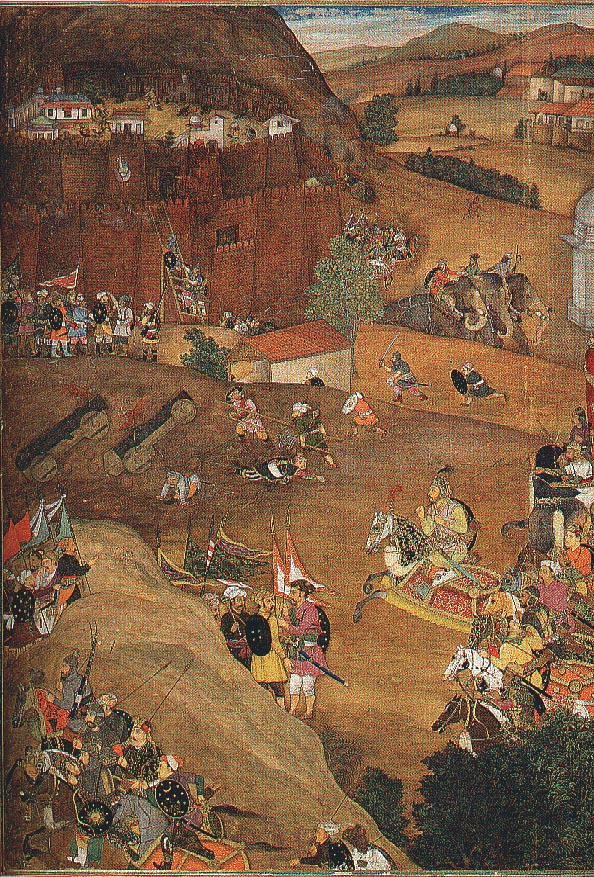
Mughal commander Azim Khan captures Dharur.

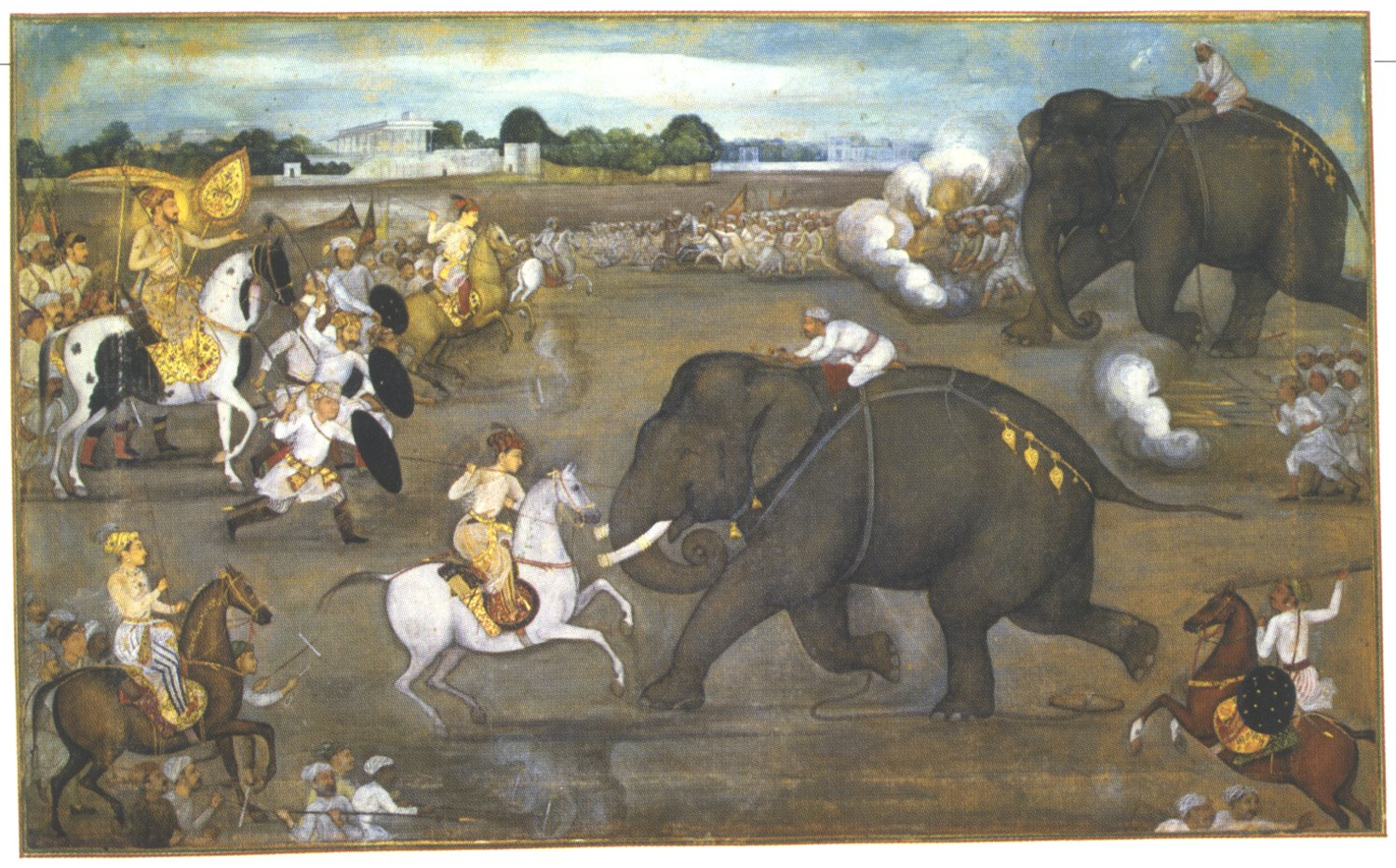
Prince Aurangzeb riding against the maddened War elephant Sudhakar in the year 1633.

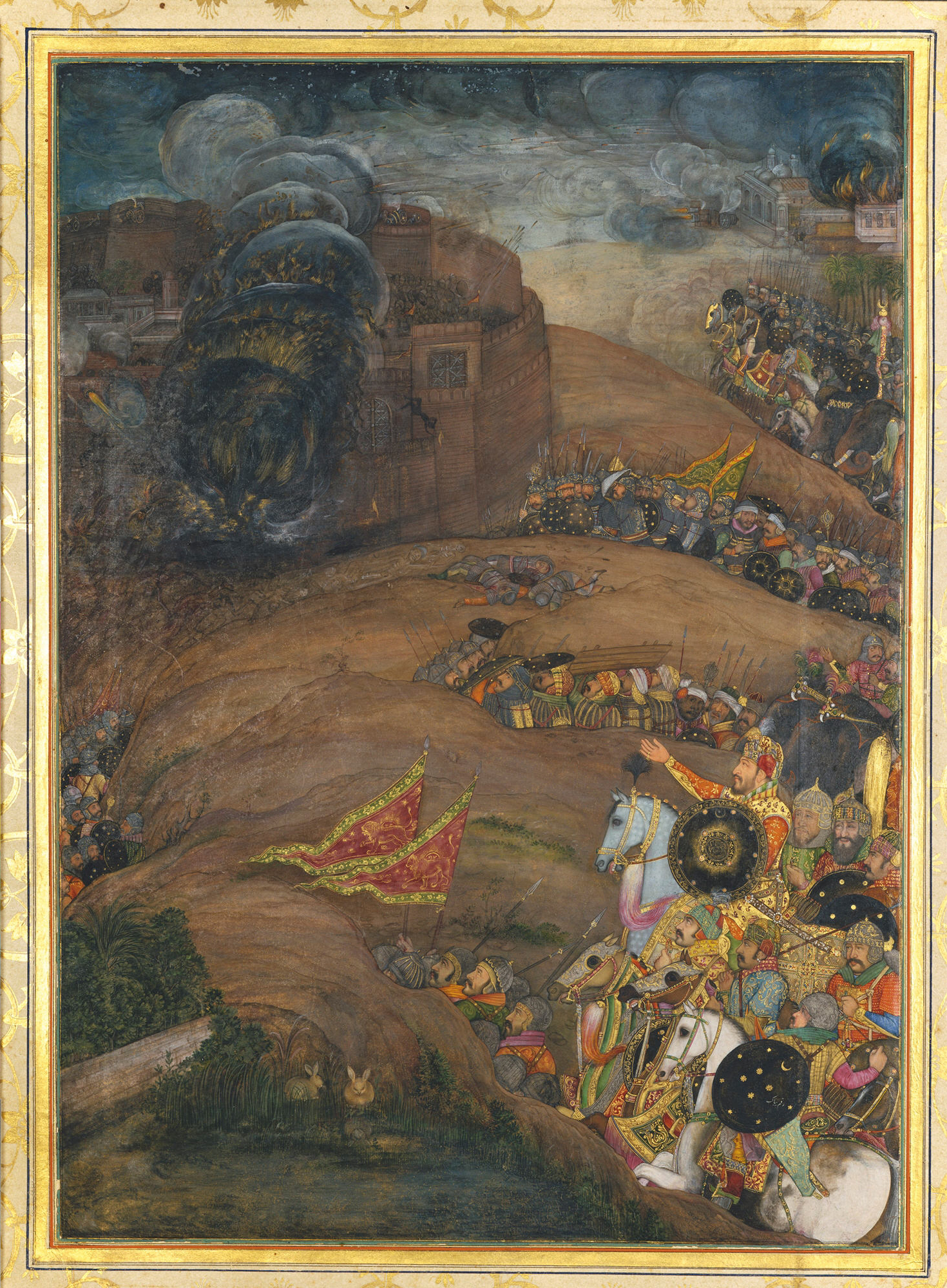
The siege at Kandhar Fort (May 1631)

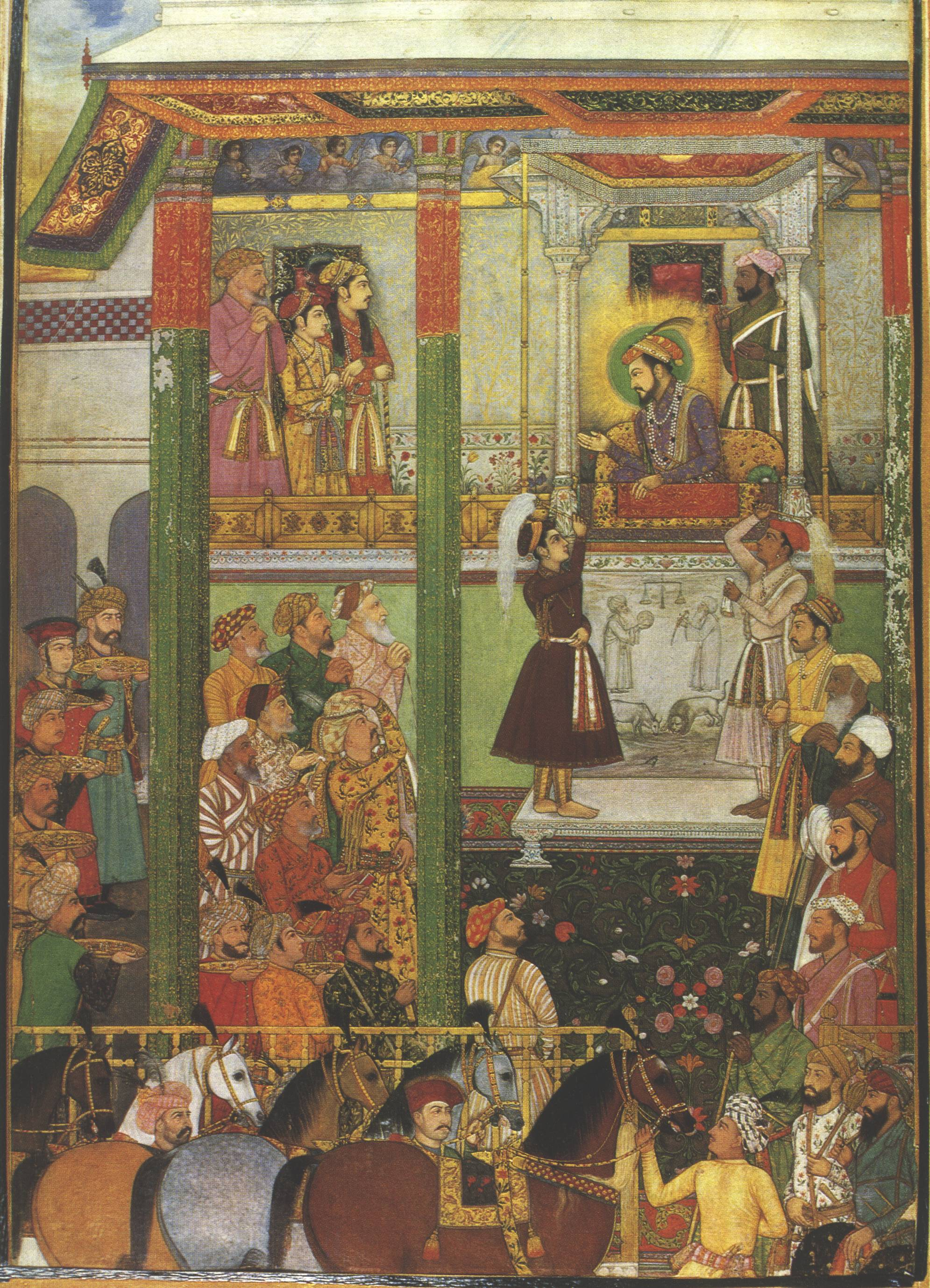
Shah Jahan receiving Persian Safavid ambassador Ali Mardan Khan in the year 1638.

== Texts online ==
- Lahori, Abdul Hamid (1875). Badshanama of Abdul Hamid Lahori. tr. by Henry Miers Elliot. Hafiz Press, Lahore.
- Bádsháh-Náma of 'Abdu-L Hamíd Láhorí Packard Humanities Institute
- Sháh Jahán-Náma of 'Ináyat Khán
