= Ali Mardan Khan =

Kurdish military leader and administrator (died 1657)

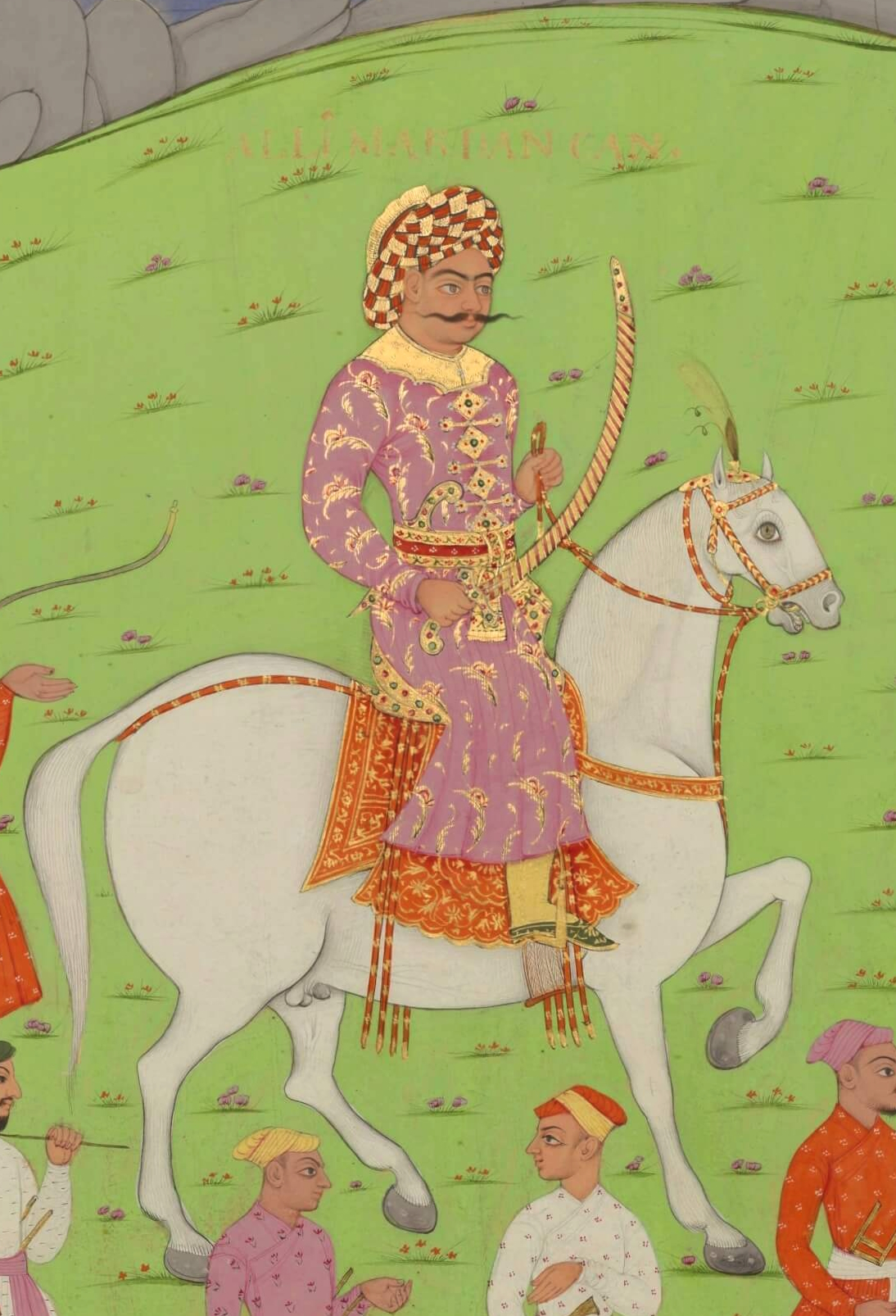
- Ali Mardan Khan painted by an Indian artist for Niccolao Manucci, Storia do Mogor (c. 1680–1700).

Safavid Governor of Kandahar
- In office 1624–1638
- Preceded by: Ganj Ali Khan
- Succeeded by: position abolished

Mughal Governor of Lahore
- In office 1639–1640
- Preceded by: Mutamid Khan
- Succeeded by: Said Khan Bahadur

Mughal Governor of Kabul
- In office 1641–1650
- Preceded by: Said Khan Bahadur
- Succeeded by: Qulij Khan Turani

Mughal Governor of Kashmir
- In office 1650–1657
- Preceded by: Zafar Khan
- Succeeded by: Itimad Khan

Personal details
- Born: Qandahar, Qandahar, Safavid Empire
- Died: 2 April 1657 Lahore, Lahore, Mughal Empire
- Resting place: Tomb of Ali Mardan Khan
- Children: Ibrahim Khan II; Abdullah Beg; Ishaq Beg; Ismail Beg; Sahibji
- Parent: Ganj Ali Khan (father)

Military service
- Allegiance: Safavid Empire (1624–1638); Mughal Empire (1638–1657)

Ali Mardan Khan (Persian: علی مردان خان; died 2 April 1657) was a 17th-century military leader and administrator, serving under the Safavid kings Shah Abbas I and Shah Safi, and later the Mughal ruler Shah Jahan. After surrendering the city of Kandahar, part of the easternmost territories of the Safavids to the Mughals in 1638, he served with distinction in the Mughal administration, earning the highest honors of the Mughal court.

== Career ==
Ali Mardan Khan was a Kurd of the Zig tribe, and son of Safavid official Ganj Ali Khan. In 1624, Ali Mardan Khan inherited his father's position when he was appointed governor of Kerman, Sistan, and Qandahar by the Safavid emperor Shah Abbas. Like his father, Ali Mardan Khan governed from the city of Qandahar. In 1625, control of Kerman was handed over to Tahmasp Qoli Khan for administrative reasons.

In 1632, Ali Mardan Khan began a series of correspondences with the Mughal court, culminating in the official surrender of his territories (including Qandahar) to the Mughal emperor Shah Jahan in March 1638. The likely reason for his actions was fear of assassination by the Safavid ruler Shah Safi, who had already caused the death or disappearance of several prominent individuals in the Safavid government. The handover of Qandahar's fortress was highlighted in Mughal and Safavid chronicles, being applauded and condemned respectively. Ali Mardan Khan's defection was generously rewarded by Shah Jahan, who sent him several gifts.

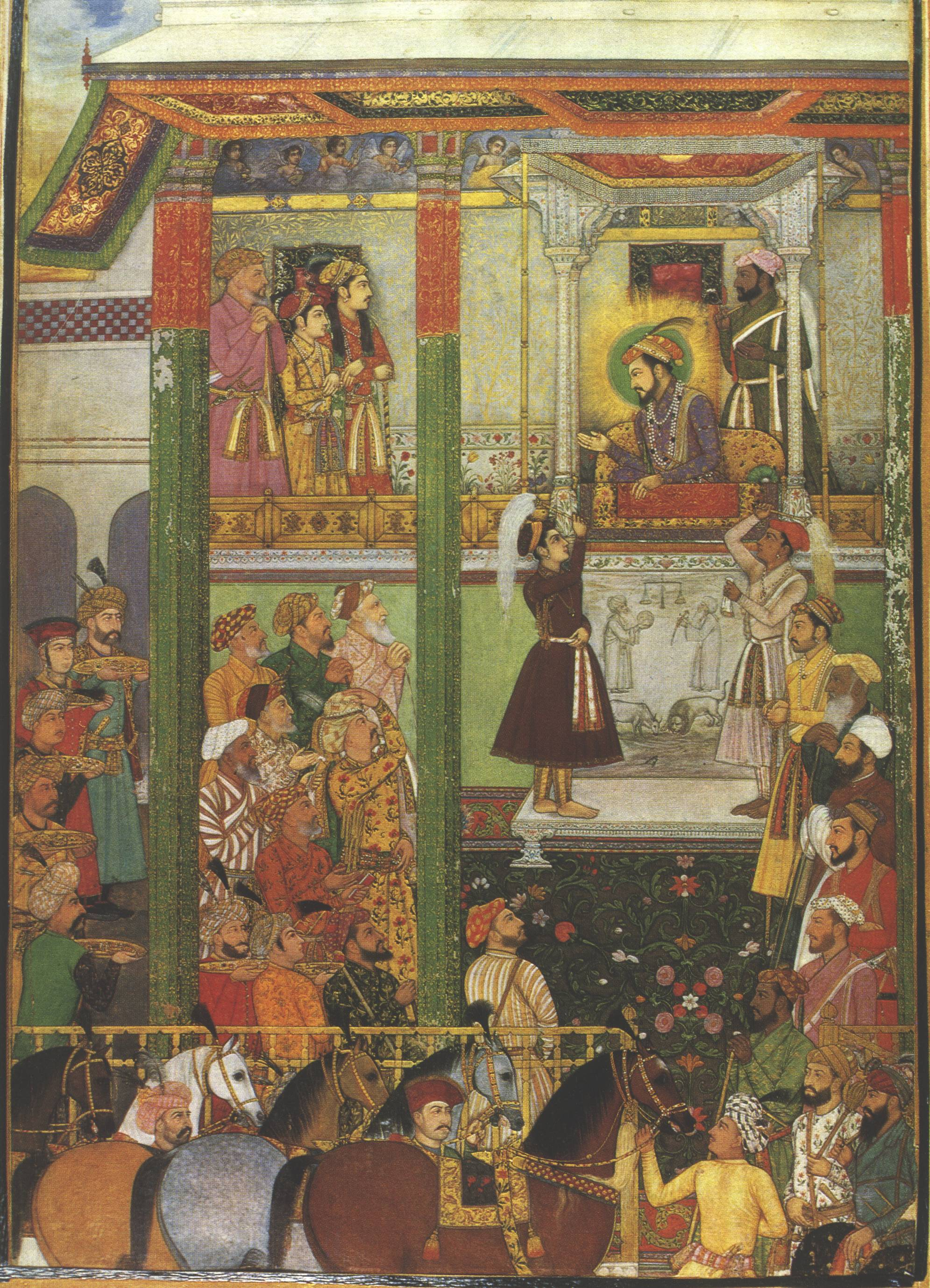
Shahjahan receives Ali Mardan Khan in durbar, c.1640

Ali Mardan Khan experienced a meteoric rise in Mughal government, becoming a member with important responsibilities and a highly favoured noble of Shah Jahan. By the year 1643, he had become the highest ranked in the Mughal nobility by reaching a rank of 7000 zat (infantry) and 7000 sowar. He was also honoured with the title Amir al-Umara (lord of the lords). Early in his tenure (1638) he was appointed governor of Kashmir; he was later additionally appointed to the Punjab, and finally was moved to a strategic position as governor of Kabul, which he held until his death.

In 1657, Ali Mardan Khan fell ill and died due to a pandemic in the Indian subcontinent. He was buried in the tomb of his mother, today the Tomb of Ali Mardan Khan.

== Family ==
Ali Mardan Khan's son Ibrahim Khan II was married to the daughter of Yahya Khan, the son of Said Khan Bahadur. His other sons were Abdullah Beg, Ishaq Beg and Ismail Beg. The latter two were appointed as commander of 1500 with 800 horse, and were killed fighting for prince Dara Shikoh at the Battle of Samugarh. One of his daughters was married to Faizullah Khan, the son of Zain Khan Koka. Another daughter, Sahibji, was married to Amir Khan Mir Miran, the Subahdar of Kabul, and ran the administration of Kabul effectively when her husband died without selecting successor until new governor was appointed. Ali Mardan Khan's other daughters were also wed into prominent Iranian families.

== Architectural works ==
Ali Mardan Khan was a notable architectural patron. As a Safavid official, he is known to have constructed the cistern of the Ganj Ali Khan complex in Kerman, and built multiple gardens in Qandahar.

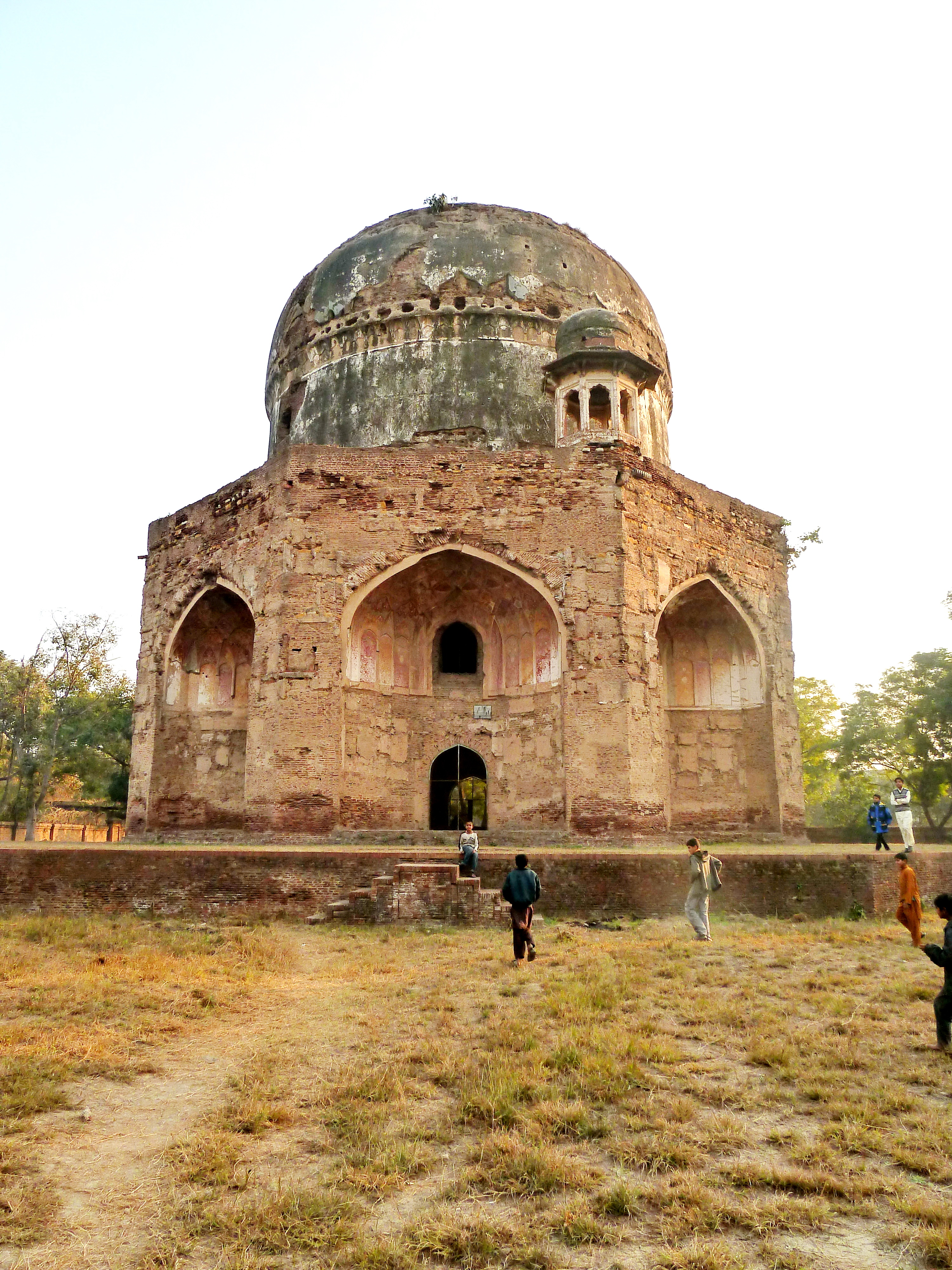
The Tomb of Ali Mardan Khan

His most notable architectural feat as a Mughal official was the creation of a canal that brought water to the suburbs of Lahore from the Ravi River, which was more than 100 miles away. This enabled the creation of Lahore's Shalimar Bagh. Another significant architectural creation was an Iranian-style covered bazaar in Peshawar, which impressed Shah Jahan and inspired the marketplace of his capital city Shahjahanabad. Ali Mardan Khan built the Chashme Shahi garden in Srinagar in addition to other gardens at Shahjahanabad and Peshawar. He is also credited with strengthening fortifications at Qandahar and undertaking civic building projects in Kabul. The tomb of Ali Mardan Khan is probably a commission by him.

== Literary works ==
He was inspired by the nocturnal view of Mount Mahadeo in Kashmir and went into a trance where he saw God.
