= List of Safavid governors of Kerman =

== Safavid governors of Kerman (1502–1736) ==
Date	Governor
1502–1514	Mohammad Khan Ustajlu
1514–15??	Ahmad-Sultan Sufi Oghlan Ustajlu
1526/36–15??	Shahqoli-Sultan
After 1569–1576	Ya'qub Beg Afshar
1576–1578/9	Mahmud-Sultan Afshar
1578/9–1589	Vali Khan Afshar
1589	Bektash Khan Afshar
1589–1596	Vali Khan Afshar and Ismail Khan
1596–1624/5	Ganj Ali Khan
1624/5–1626	Tahmasp Quli Khan
1626–1629	Amir Khan Zul-Qadr
1637–1645	Jani Beg Khan Bigdeli Shamlu
1645–1653	Mortezaqoli Khan Begdeli Shamlu
1653–1659	Abbas-qoli Khan Qajar
1659–1669	Mas'ud Safiqoli Beg
1669–1675	Shaykh Ali Khan Zangana
1675–1676	Khan Ahmad Beg
1676–?	Mansur Beg
May 1693 – 1699	Shahverdi Khan
1699	Gurgin Khan
1709–1711	Jesse of Kartli
1716	Mortezaqoli Khan Afshar
1716–1717	Ibrahim Khan Qaraguzlu
1717	Rustam Khan

== Sources ==
- Matthee, Rudi (2014). "KERMAN vii. In the Safavid Period". Encyclopaedia Iranica.
