= Tomb of Ali Mardan Khan =

Monuments in Lahore, Pakistan

- مقبرہ علی مردان خان
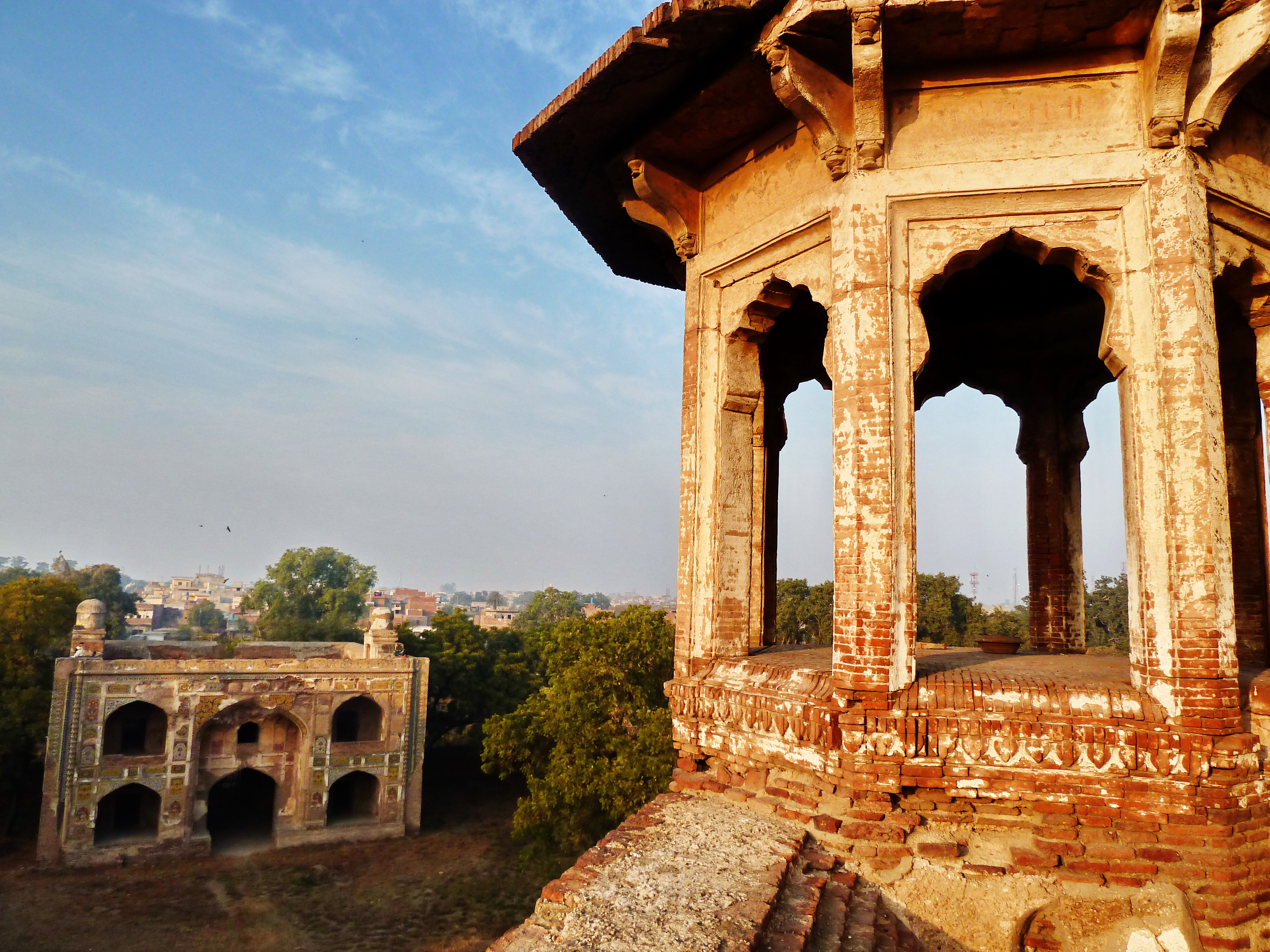
- Main structure of the mausoleum with its gateway
- Interactive map of Tomb of Ali Mardan Khan
- Location: Mughalpura, Lahore, Punjab, Pakistan
- Coordinates: 31.5738°N 74.3633°E
- Type: Mausoleum
- Material: Brick (once faced with sandstone, marble, and kashi kari tile inlay)
- Dedicated to: Ali Mardan Khan (died 1657); Governor of Kashmir, Lahore and Kabul during Shah Jahan's ruling period

The tomb of Ali Mardan Khan (Urdu: مقبرہ علی مردان خان) is a Mughal era tomb in the city of Lahore, Pakistan that was built in the 1630s.

== Background ==
Ali Mardan Khan was a Kurd who first worked in the court of the Persian Safavid ruler Shah Safi, before moving to the Mughal court. The tomb is of octagonal plan.

He was experienced in the management of engineering works, especially the construction of canals, and worked on many large projects in the Mughal territories in modern Pakistan and Afghanistan. He was appointed as the governor of Kashmir, Lahore and Kabul, then of the Punjab in 1639 during Mughal emperor Shah Jahan ruling period. Ali Murad Khan died in 1657 while going to Kashmir.

His body was bought back to this tomb which he constructed for his mother. Ali Mardan Khan, his mother and a third woman is buried here. According to some accounts she was his daughter while other refer to the woman as a female servant of his mother.

Though Khan was an engineer and courtier, he has come to be locally regarded as a notable spiritual figure, and locals call the tomb Mardan Khan's durbar (shrine). The grave is in a chamber below ground level, accessed by stairs, and has been decorated by visitors as though it were a saint's shrine.

== Architecture ==
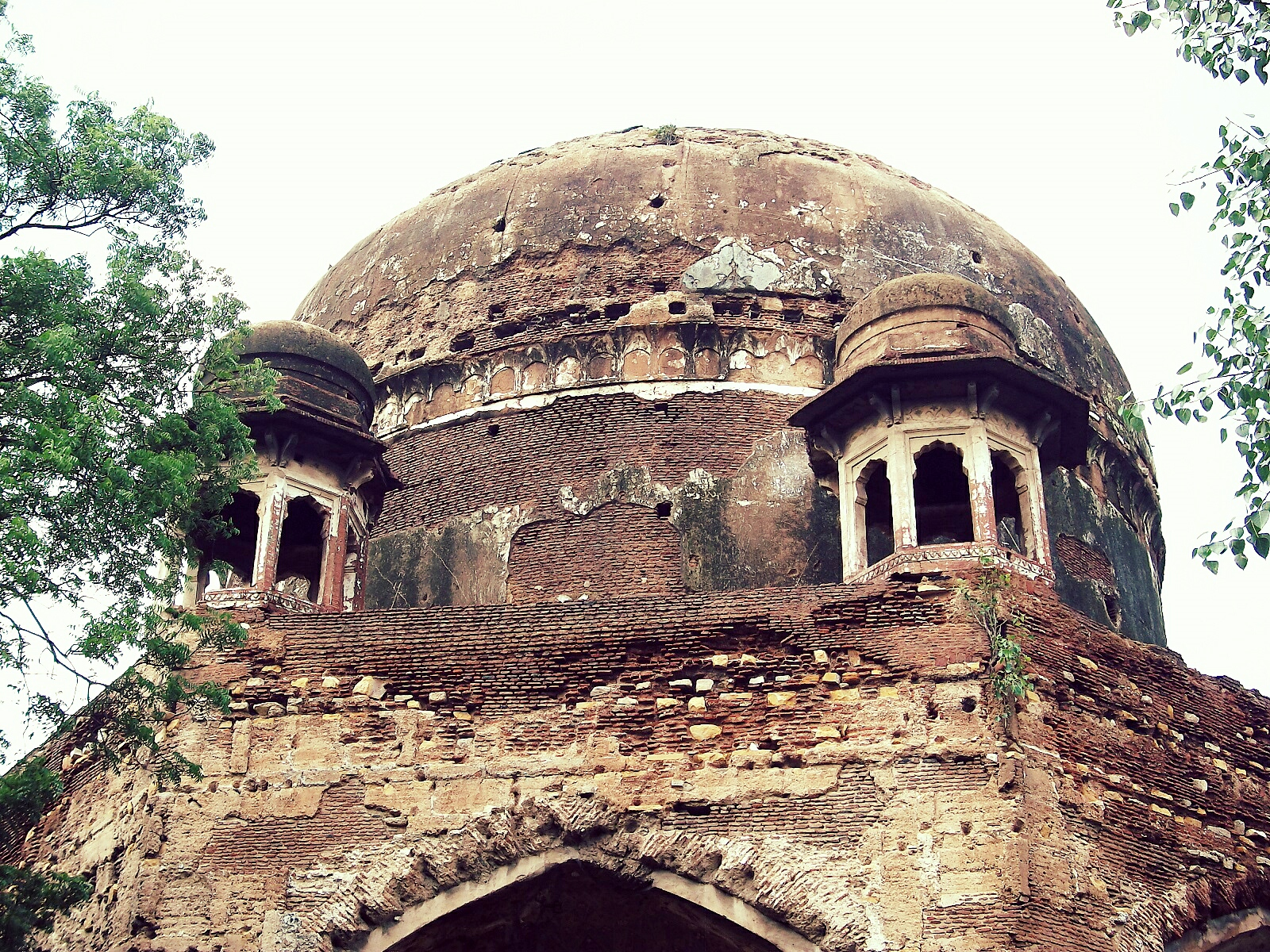
The corners of the tombs once all had small domes.

The tomb is now in a semi-ruined state, lacking its decorations, though the main structure is intact. This is in brick with a dome of 42 feet (13 m) in diameter above an octagonal drum with iwans on each side. There are kiosks around the top of the drum. The tomb stands on an octagonal podium, with each side 58 feet (18 m) at the edge. It would have been originally decorated with stone facings and inlays (kashi kari), and fresco paintings, some traces of which remain on the tomb. The two storey gatehouse has retained much more of its decoration; originally there were perhaps four gateways. The tomb would have stood in the centre of a paradise garden as other Mughal tombs do.

== Conservation ==
The tomb is surrounded by railway property, and located on Mughalpura Road (which was earlier known as Vetman Road or Wheatman Road) which is from right from the Grand Trunk Road. Near the railway track on the road is a sign board where "MET-1" is written, beyond which lies the gate through which people can access the tomb, through a passageway.

== Gallery ==
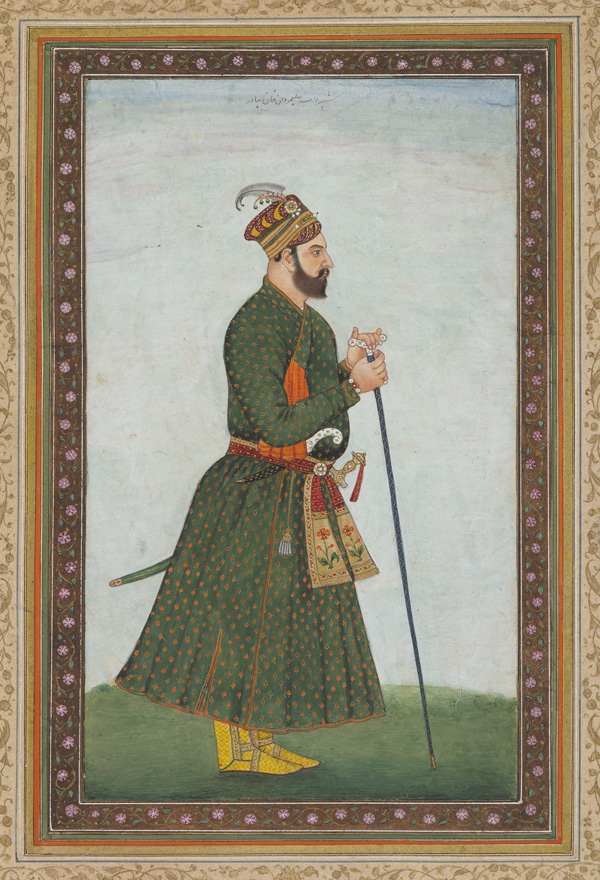
The tomb was built for Nawab Ali Mardan Khan.

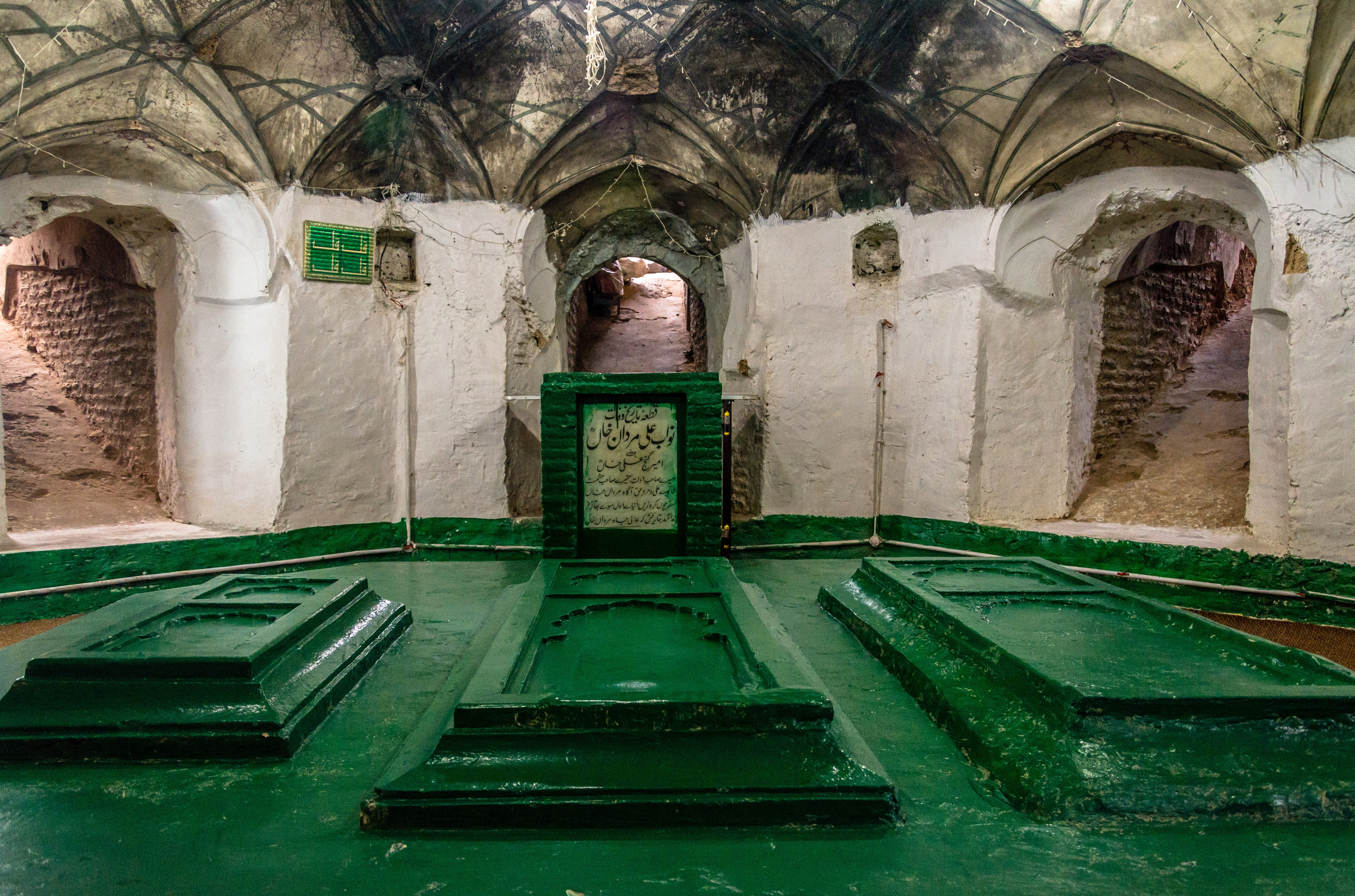
The burial chamber is subterranean

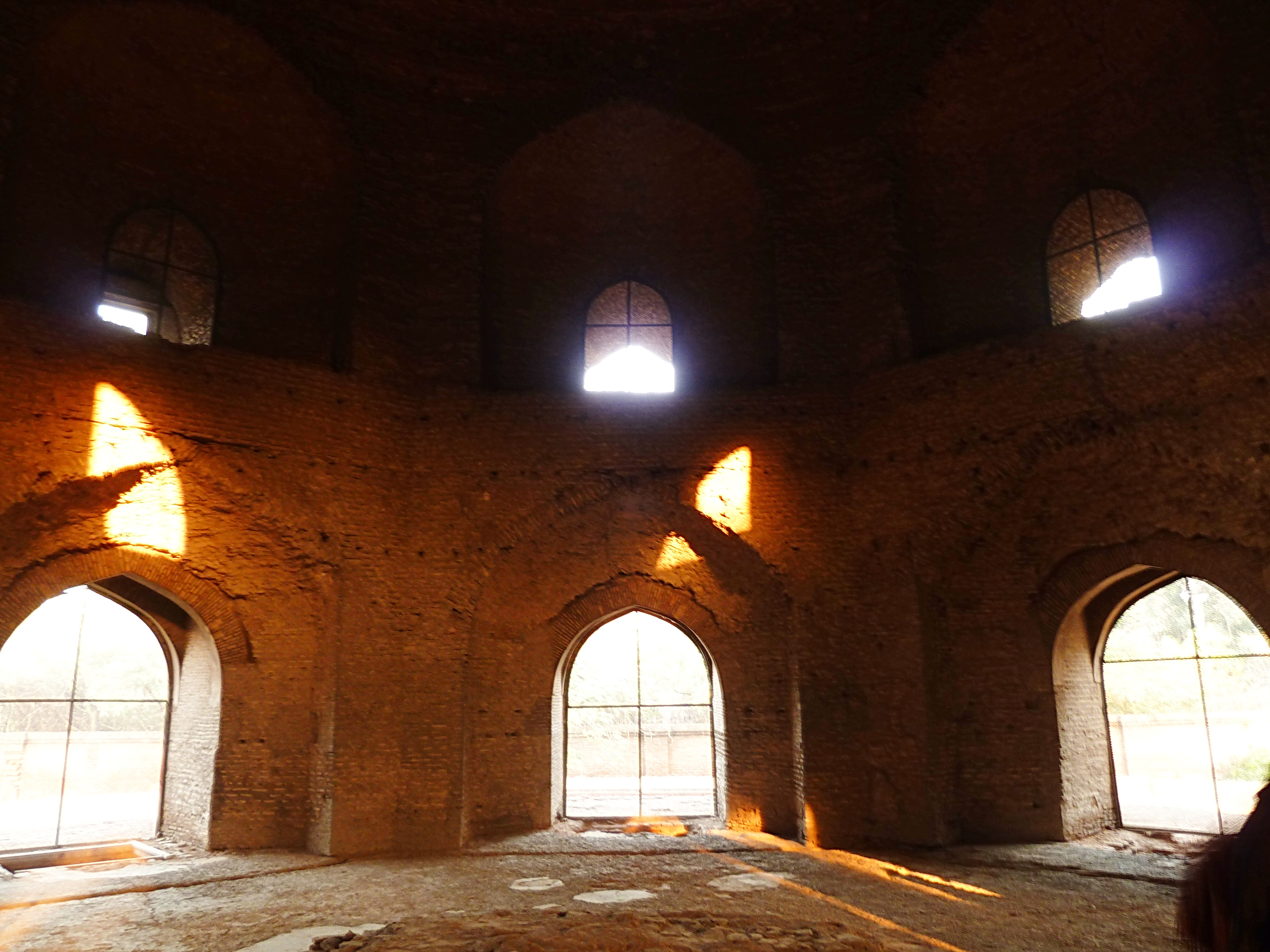
The tomb lies largely empty, as the burial crypt is subterranean

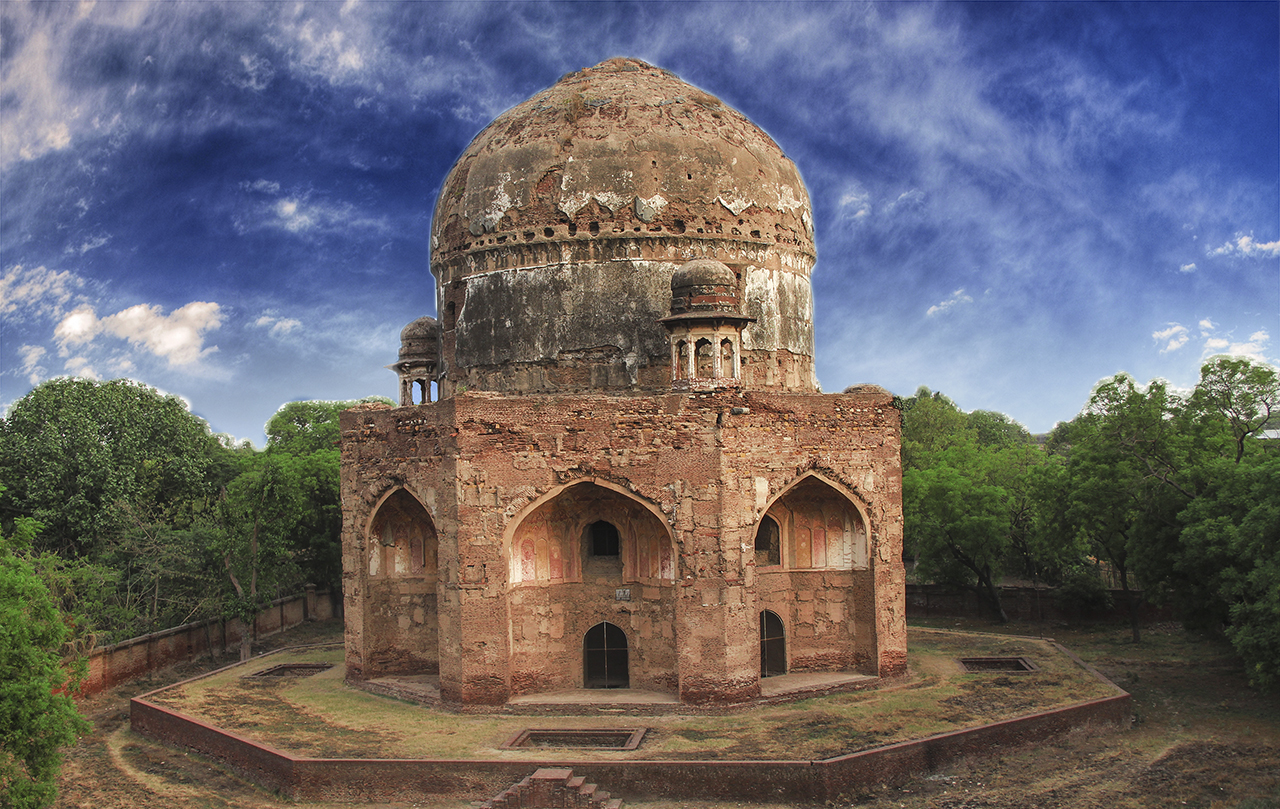
An exterior view of the mausoleum

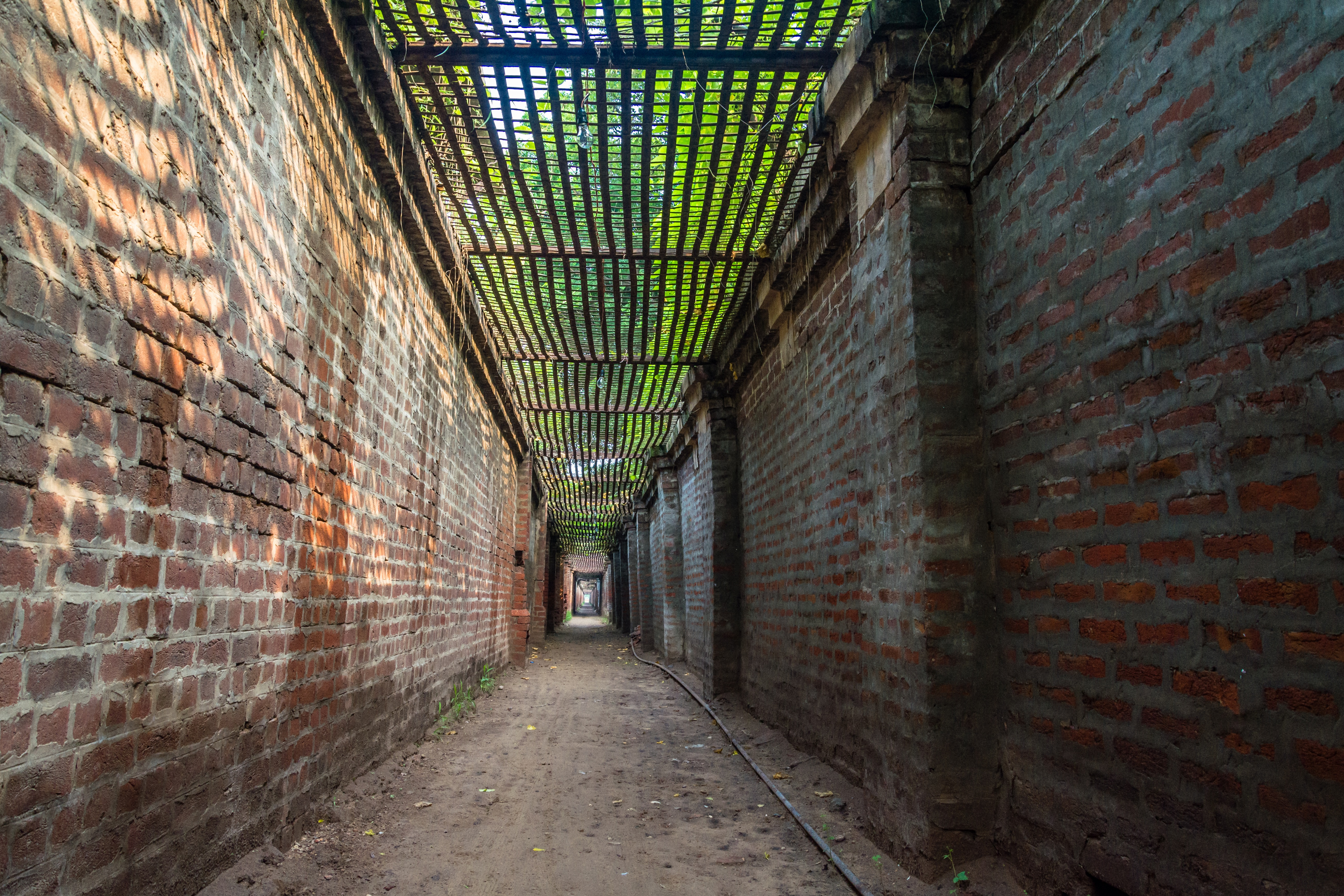
The tomb is surrounded by Pakistan Railways property, and can only be accessed through a walled passageway.
