= Ibrahim Khan II =

Subahdar of Bengal from 1689 to 1697

28th Subahdar of Bengal
- In office 1689 – 22 September 1697
- Monarch: Aurangzeb
- Preceded by: Shaista Khan
- Succeeded by: Azim-us-Shan

Personal details
- Died: c. 1701 Lahore, Lahore, Mughal Empire
- Children: Wazir Ibrahim Khan
- Parent: Ali Mardan Khan (father)

Ibrahim Khan II (Persian: ابراهیم خان ای)(reigned: 1689–1697; died 1701) was the Subahdar of Bengal during the reign of emperor Aurangzeb. His only child was a son Named Wazir Ibrahim Khan (1654–1713) and was diwan of Emperor Jahandar Shah. He was killed at the orders of Farrukhsiyar.

== Early life ==
He was the eldest son of Ali Mardan Khan. Ali Mardan was a noble of Kurdish origin. Prior to the governorship of Bengal, Ibrahim Khan served as the Mughal Subahdar of Kashmir, Lahore and Bihar. He had a son named Zabardast Khan.

== Reign ==
During his reign, English and French traders were granted several farmans to continue trading in Bengal. During 1695–1696, he failed to suppress the revolt of the Chandrakona zamindar, Shobha Singh. Later in 1697, Ibrahim Khan was replaced by emperor Aurangzeb's own grandson, Prince Azim-us-Shan.

== See also ==
- List of rulers of Bengal
- History of Bengal
- History of Bangladesh
- History of India

Preceded by Shaista Khan	Subahdar of Bengal; 1689-1697	Succeeded by Azim-us-Shan
