= Ganj Ali Khan =

17th century Safavid military officer and provincial governor

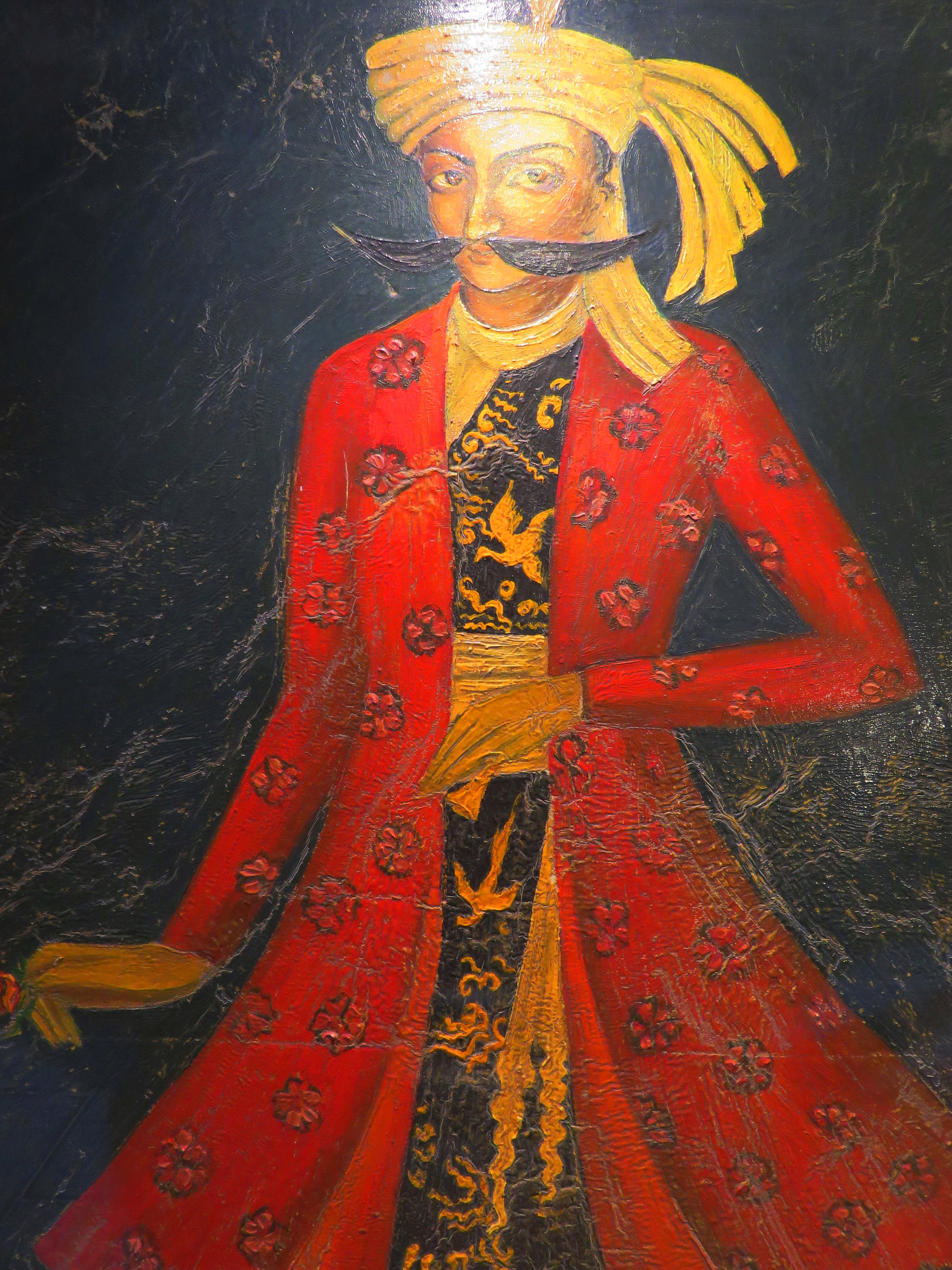

Governor of Kerman
- In office 1596–1624/5
- Monarch: Abbas the Great
- Preceded by: Bektash Khan (governor of Baghdad)
- Succeeded by: Tahmasp Qoli Khan

Governor of Sistan
- In office 1596–1624/5
- Monarch: Abbas the Great

Governor of Qandahar
- In office 1622–1624/5
- Monarch: Abbas the Great
- Preceded by: Office established
- Succeeded by: Ali Mardan Khan

Personal details
- Died: c. 1624 Qandahar, Qandahar, Safavid Empire
- Children: Ali Mardan Khan
- Occupation: Military leader, official

Military service
- Allegiance: Safavid Empire

Ganj Ali Khan (Persian: گنجعلیخان or گنج علی خان; died 1624) was a military officer in Safavid Iran, who served as governor in various provinces and was known for his loyal service to king (shah) Abbas I. Ganj Ali Khan continuously aided the shah on almost all of his military campaigns until his own death in 1624/5. He was also a great builder, the Ganjali Khan Complex being one of his finest achievements.

== Biography ==
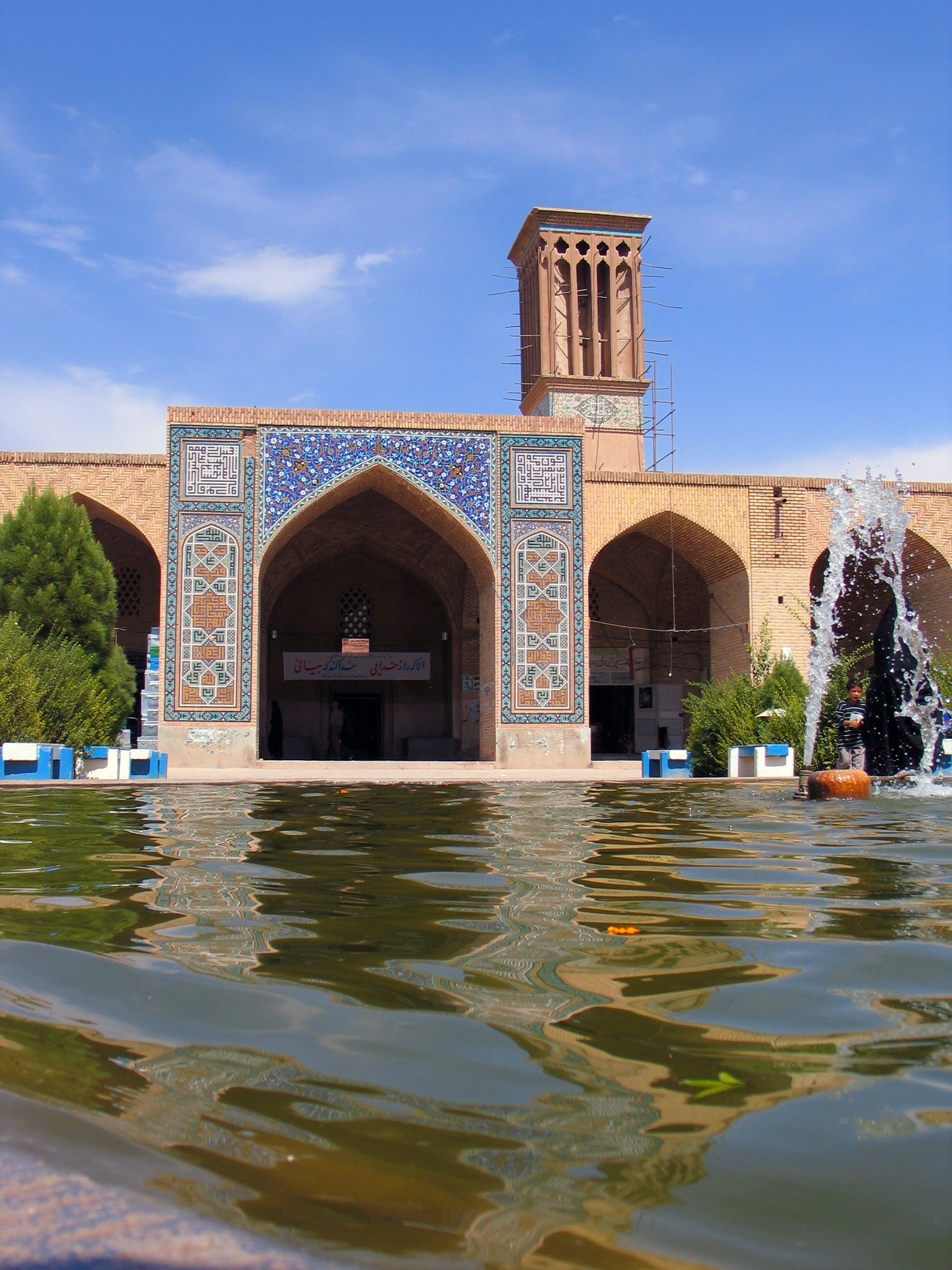
Picture of the Ganjali Khan Complex, one of the many buildings that were made under Ganj Ali Khan.

Ganj Ali Khan originally belonged to a Kurdish tribe roaming in western Iran, but was, as a minor, taken to Herat in Khorasan, where he grew up with prince Abbas I. They both became close friends, and continued to do so when Abbas I ascended the Safavid throne in 1587. In 1596, Abbas I, after having suppressed a rebellion in Kerman and putting an end to Qizilbash governorship of the place, appointed Ganj Ali Khan as its governor. Furthermore, he was also appointed governor of Sistan, and shortly afterwards seized Qal'e-ye Fath and Qal'e-ye Taraqun from the Uzbeks. In 1602/3, he took part in the Safavid campaign to capture the Uzbek-controlled city of Bukhara. He also took part in the Ottoman–Safavid War of 1603–18.

In the mid 1600s, the Zoroastrian community of Kerman protested against the hostile treatment by the local Islamic clergy, and also accused Ganj Ali Khan of seizing and destroying their homes to make space for his construction projects. This made Abbas travel to Kerman to investigate the matter in 1606, where he found that Ganj Ali Khan was not the real perpetrator. Abbas then returned to his capital, Isfahan, where he issued an edict that ordered protection for the Zoroastrians.

In 1611, a rebellion in Balochistan occurred, which Ganj Ali Khan suppressed by capturing their stronghold. Five years later, Ganj Ali Khan was once again present in the Ottoman-Safavid War, and participated in the successful invasion of Georgia. In 1622, Ganj Ali Khan was appointed as the governor of the newly captured city of Qandahar. He later died in 1624/5, while the governorship of Qandahar went to his son Ali Mardan Khan and the governorship of Kerman to a certain Tahmasp Qoli Khan.

== Building activities ==
Ganj Ali Khan is mostly remembered for his building activities, such as the Zayn al-Din caravansary in Yazd, and the cistern in the Loot desert between Khorasan and Kerman.

His most prominent construction, is, however, the Ganjali Khan Complex in Kerman.

== See also ==
- List of Safavid governors of Kerman

== Sources ==
- Matthee, Rudi (2014). "KERMAN vii. In the Safavid Period". Encyclopaedia Iranica.
- Matthee, Rudi (2010). "KANDAHAR iv. From The Mongol Invasion Through the Safavid Era". Encyclopaedia Iranica, Vol. XV, Fasc. 5. pp. 478–484.
- Parizi, Mohammad-Ebrahim Bastani (2000). "GANJ-ʿALĪ KHAN". Encyclopaedia Iranica, Vol. X, Fasc. 3. pp. 284–285.
- Blow, David (2009). Shah Abbas: The Ruthless King Who became an Iranian Legend. London, UK: I. B. Tauris & Co. Ltd. ISBN 978-1-84511-989-8. LCCN 2009464064.
- Matthee, Rudi (2011). Persia in Crisis: Safavid Decline and the Fall of Isfahan. I.B.Tauris. pp. 1–371. ISBN 978-0857731814.
- Babaie, Sussan (2004). Slaves of the Shah: New Elites of Safavid Iran. I.B.Tauris. pp. 1–218. ISBN 9781860647215.
- Newman, Andrew J. (2008). Safavid Iran: Rebirth of a Persian Empire. I.B.Tauris. pp. 1–281. ISBN 9780857716613.
- Roemer, H.R. (1986). "The Safavid period". The Cambridge History of Iran, Volume 5: The Timurid and Safavid periods. Cambridge: Cambridge University Press. pp. 189–351. ISBN 9780521200943.

Preceded by Bektash Khan (governor of Baghdad)	Governor of Kerman; 1596 – 1624/5	Succeeded by Tahmasp Qoli Khan
Unknown	Governor of Sistan; 1596 – 1624/5	Unknown
Preceded by Office created	Governor of Qandahar; 1622 – 1624/5	Succeeded by Ali Mardan Khan
