= Mughal–Safavid war (1622–1623) =

War fought over control of Kandahar, Afghanistan, between the Safavid and Mughal empires

- Part of the Mughal–Persian wars
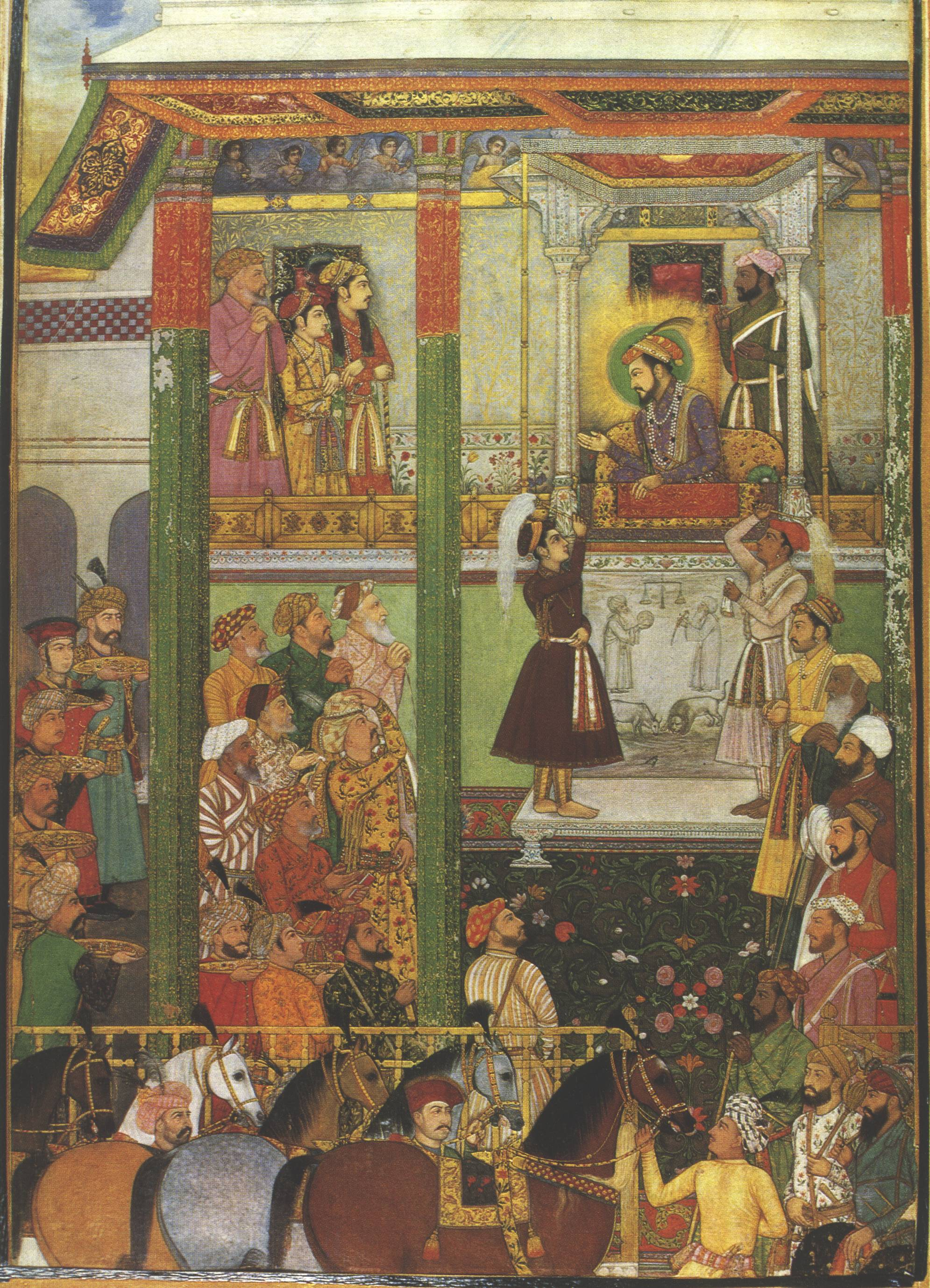
- Shah Jahan receives Persian ambassadors
| Date | 20 May 1622 – Spring 1623 |
| Location | Loy Kandahar, modern day Afghanistan |
| Result | Safavid victory |
| Territorial changes | Kandahar falls to Safavid iran |

Belligerents
| Safavid Iran | Mughal India |

Commanders and leaders
| (Safavid Iran) Abbas the Great (Safavid Iran) Ganj Ali Khan (Safavid Iran) Khosrow Sultan (Safavid Iran) Mirza Quli Mansur | Jahangir (surrendered); Abdul Aziz Khan (surrendered); Shamshir Khan (surrendered); Ali Quli Durman (surrendered); Mirza Fazl (surrendered); Makhdumzada (surrendered); Khwaja Aftab (surrendered); Muhammad Khan (surrendered); Tula Khan (surrendered) |

Strength
| 2,000 | 6,000 |

The Mughal–Safavid war of 1622–1623 was fought over the important fortress city of Kandahar, now located in Afghanistan, between the Safavid Empire and the Mughal Empire.

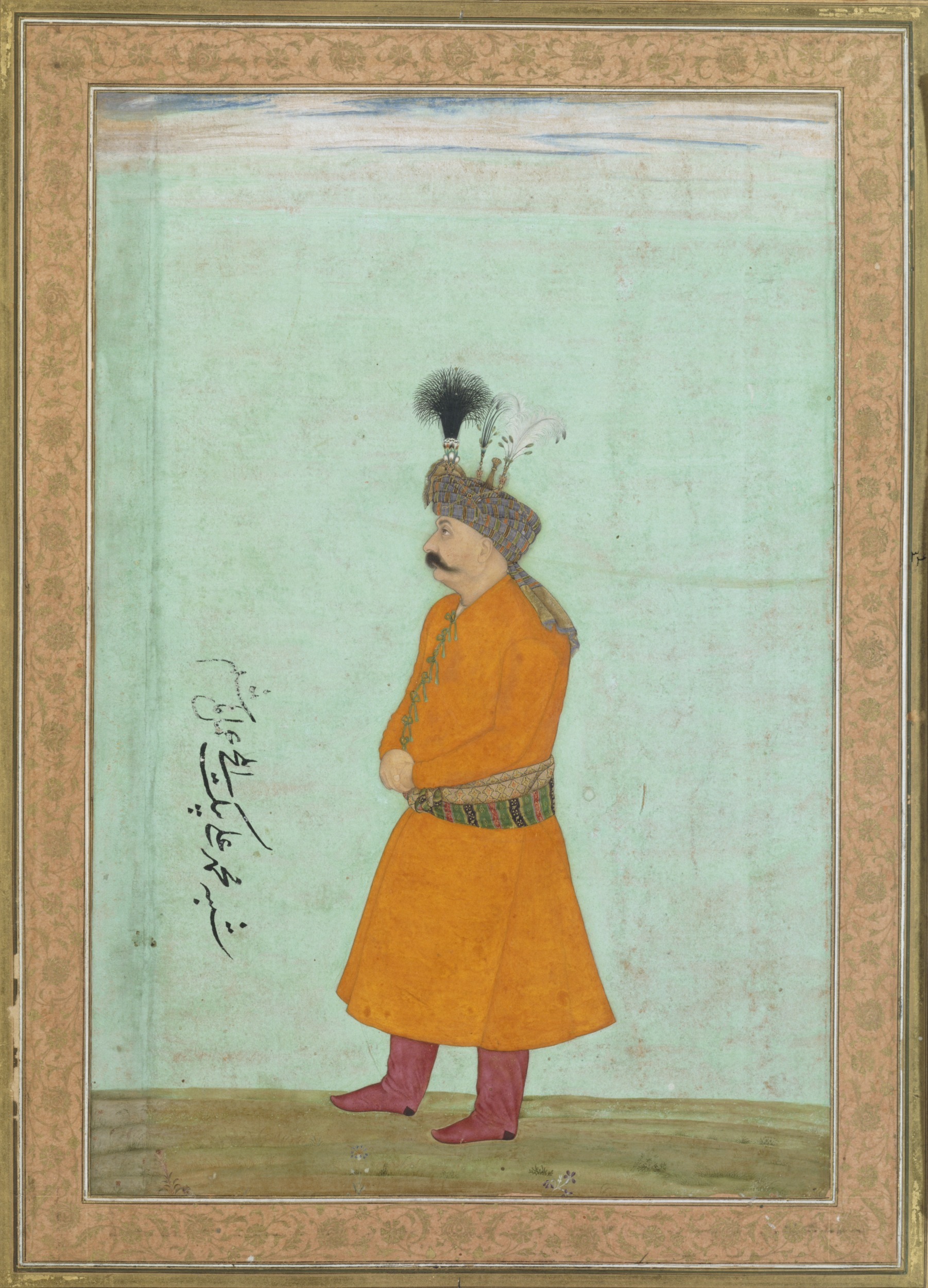
Muhammad Ali Beg was the Persian ambassador sent to the Mughal court of Jahangir by Abbas I of Persia, arriving in time for Muharram in March 1631. He remained there until October 1632, thus negotiating an end to the conflict between the Mughals and the Safavids.

== Background ==
In 1540 and 1555, the Safavids gave political and military support to the Mughal Empire Humayun to get his throne back. In return, Humayun gave Kandahar to Iran. Years later in 1590, the Mughal Empire took advantage of a tactical weakness in Iran and took over the city following Kandahar.

Shah Abbas had desired to capture the strategic fortress in Kandahar since he had lost it in 1595. In 1605 the governor of Herat, Husein Khan, besieged the city but the tenacious defense of the Mughal governor, Shah Beg Khan, and the arrival in the next year of a relieving Mughal army to Kandahar forced the Safavids to retreat. With the conclusion of the Ottoman–Safavid War (1603–18), Shah Abbas was secure enough for a war on his eastern frontier, so in 1621 he ordered an army to gather at Nishapur.

== Siege ==
After celebrating the Iranian New Year at Tabas Gilaki in southern Khorasan, Abbas joined with his army and marched on Kandahar where he arrived on 20 May and immediately began a siege. Though Jahangir had information of the Persian's movements he was slow to respond, and without reinforcements, the small garrison of 3,000 men could not hold for long.

Shah Abbas started moving toward Kandahar and tried to hide the siege. He claimed he went hunting near the Helmand and Arghandab rivers to cover his movements. He sent messages to the governor of Kandahar, Abdul Aziz Khan asking him to come out and welcome him. The Mughals fully understood the Shah's intentions, so they refused. They sent messages saying they would defend the fort out of loyalty to Emperor Jahangir. When Shah Abbas read this, he became very angry and showed his forces in front of the walls of Kandahar on the same day. Abdul Aziz Khan started firing cannons at the Safavid camp. After that, Shah Abbas stopped his forces for a few days and tried to convince the garrison to surrender peacefully, but the Mughals refused. The actual siege began and lasted between 5 and 6 weeks, specifically 45 days.

The Mughal Emperor asked his son and heir apparent Khurram who was at Mandu in the Deccan to lead the campaign and move the Barha Sayyids, the Indian Bukhari Sayyids, the Shaikhzadas, and the Rajputs back to the north, but Khurram evaded the assignment fearing to lose his political power while he was away from court. The relief force the Mughals could assemble proved too small to raise the siege, so after a 45-day siege the city fell on 22 June, followed shortly after by Zamindawar. Because the Safavids lacked cannons, they relied on digging tactics and tunneling through the walls. After 17 days of work, the Safavid soldiers managed to create large gaps in the walls, which led to the collapse of the towers. Facing this weakness, the Mughal garrison realized they were defeated and surrendered.

After fortifying the city and appointing Ganj Ali Khan as governor of the city, Abbas returned to Khorasan via Ghur, subduing on the way troubling emirs in Chaghcharan and Gharjistan.

== Conclusion ==
The fall of Kandahar led to an internal crisis in the Mughal Empire. Prince Jahan took advantage of the crisis to declare a rebellion against his father, Emperor Jahangir which stopped any immediate Mughal attempt to take back the city Diplomatically, Abbas sent letters of reassurance to India, confirming that taking the city was the recovery of a historical right and not personal choice. He also sent golden keys as a symbol of friendship. In the spring of 1623 a Mughal envoy arrived at the Shah's camp with a letter from the Emperor accepting the loss of Kandahar and putting an end to the conflict.

== Bibliography ==
- Chandra, Satish (2005). Medieval India:from Sultanat to the Mughals. Vol. 2. Har-Anand Publications. ISBN 9788124110669.
- Burton, Audrey (1997). The Bukharans:a dynastic, diplomatic, and commercial history, 1550–1702. Palgrave Macmillan. ISBN 9780312173876.
- Kohn, George C. (2007). Dictionary of wars. Infobase Publishing. ISBN 9780816065776.
- "KANDAHAR iv. From The Mongol Invasion Through the Safavid Era". Encyclopædia Iranica.
