= Ganjali Khan Complex =

Historic complex in Kerman, Iran

Ganjali Khan Complex مجموعه گنجعلیخان
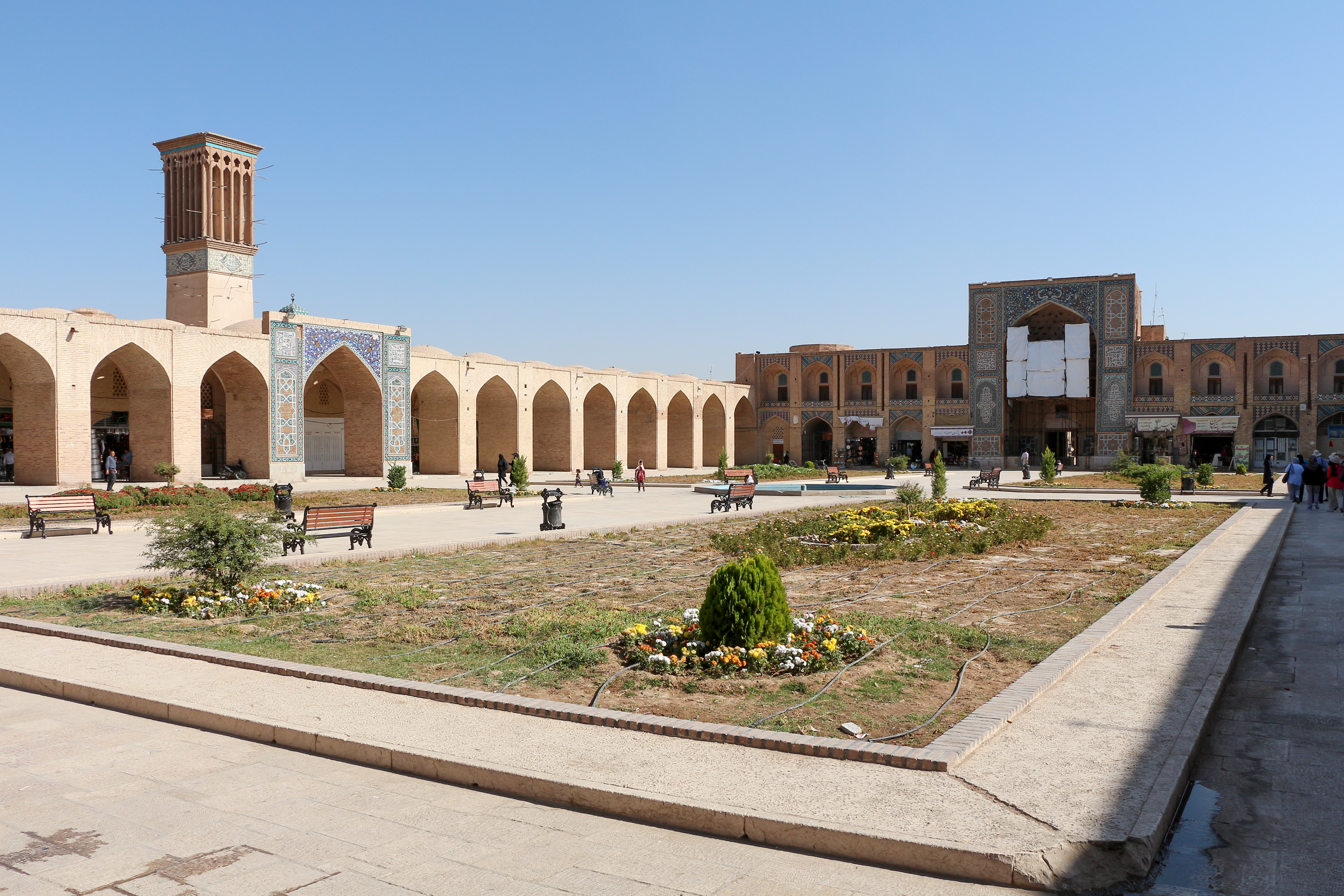

General information
- Architectural style: Isfahani style
- Location: Kerman, Iran
- Coordinates: 30°17′24″N 57°4′41″E
- Construction started: 1596
- Completed: 1631

Iran National Heritage List
- Official name: Ganjali Khan Complex
- Type: Plaza/Mosque/Caravanserai/Hammam
- Designated: 1937
- Reference no.: 297
- Conservation organization: Cultural Heritage, Handicrafts and Tourism Organization of Iran

Design and construction
- Architect: Mohammad Soltani Yazdi

UNESCO World Heritage Site
- Part of: The Persian Caravanserai
- Criteria: Cultural: ii, iii
- Reference: 1668-033
- Inscription: 2023 (45th Session)

The Ganjali Khan Complex (Persian: مجموعه گنجعلیخان, romanized: Majmou'e-ye Ganjali Khan) is a Safavid era building complex, located in the old city center of Kerman in Iran. The complex is composed of a school, a square, a caravanserai, a bathhouse (hammam), an Ab anbar (water reservoir), a mint, a mosque and a bazaar.

== History ==
The Ganjali Khan Complex was built by Ganj Ali Khan who governed Kerman, Sistan and Kandahar provinces from 1596 to 1621 under Abbas the Great. A number of inscriptions laid inside the complex indicate the exact date when these places have been built. The architect of the complex was Mohammad Soltani from Yazd.

== Architecture ==
The complex covers an area of 11,000 square meters and is centered on a large public square—ninety-nine meters by fifty-four meters—which is aligned with Vakil Bazaar running east–west to its south. The square is enveloped by bazaar arcades to the north, south and west and is flanked by the Ganjali Caravanserai to the east. The entrance to the Ganjali bathhouse is located along a section of Vakil Bazaar south of the square, known as Ganjali Khan Bazaar. The complex was built in Isfahani style of architecture.

== Monuments and buildings ==
=== Ganjali Khan Square ===
In ancient Iran, the squares of the cities were established near the governorships and were places for gatherings and ceremonies. The Ganjali square is ninety-nine meters by fifty-four meter, and Similar to Naqsh-e Jahan Square in Isfahan and Mir Chakhmagh Square in Yazd, is surrounded by urban elements such as bazaars, Caravanserais and schools.

=== Ganjali Khan Bathhouse ===
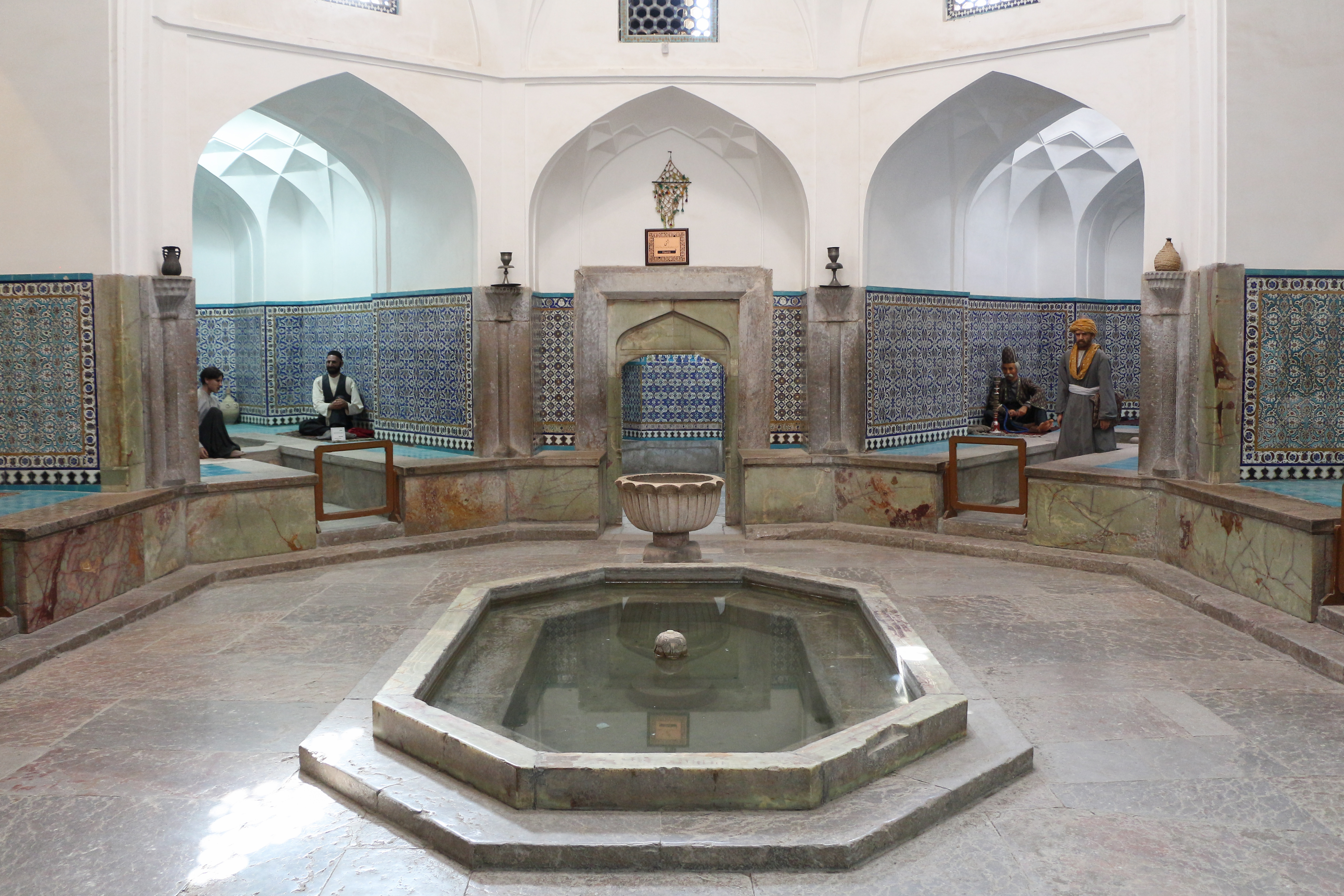
Ganjali Khan Bathhouse

Built in 1611, the Ganjali bathhouse is located on the southern side of Ganjali Square, off a section of Vakil Bazaar known as Ganjali Bazaar. The entrance of the building are painted with ornaments of the Safavid era. An interesting feature of its architectural finish is that the sculptured stones of the ceiling coincide with that of the flooring. It is composed of a disrobing room, cold room and hot room, all covered with domes carried on squinches. The Ganjali Baths are unique works of architecture decorated with exquisite tile works, paintings, stuccos, and arches.

The bathhouse were converted into an anthropological museum in 1971. In the closet section and main yard of the bath there are many lifelike statues. These statues were designed at Tehran University's faculty of fine arts in 1973 and then transferred to this museum.

=== Ganjali Khan Bazaar ===
The bazaar is located in southern part of Ganjali Square. Inside, the bazaar is decorated with exquisite plasterwork and wall paintings and although they are 400 years old, they are still well-preserved. The bazaar is 93 meters long and is connected to Ganjali square through 16 iwans and vaults.

=== Ganjali Khan Caravanserai and Mosque ===
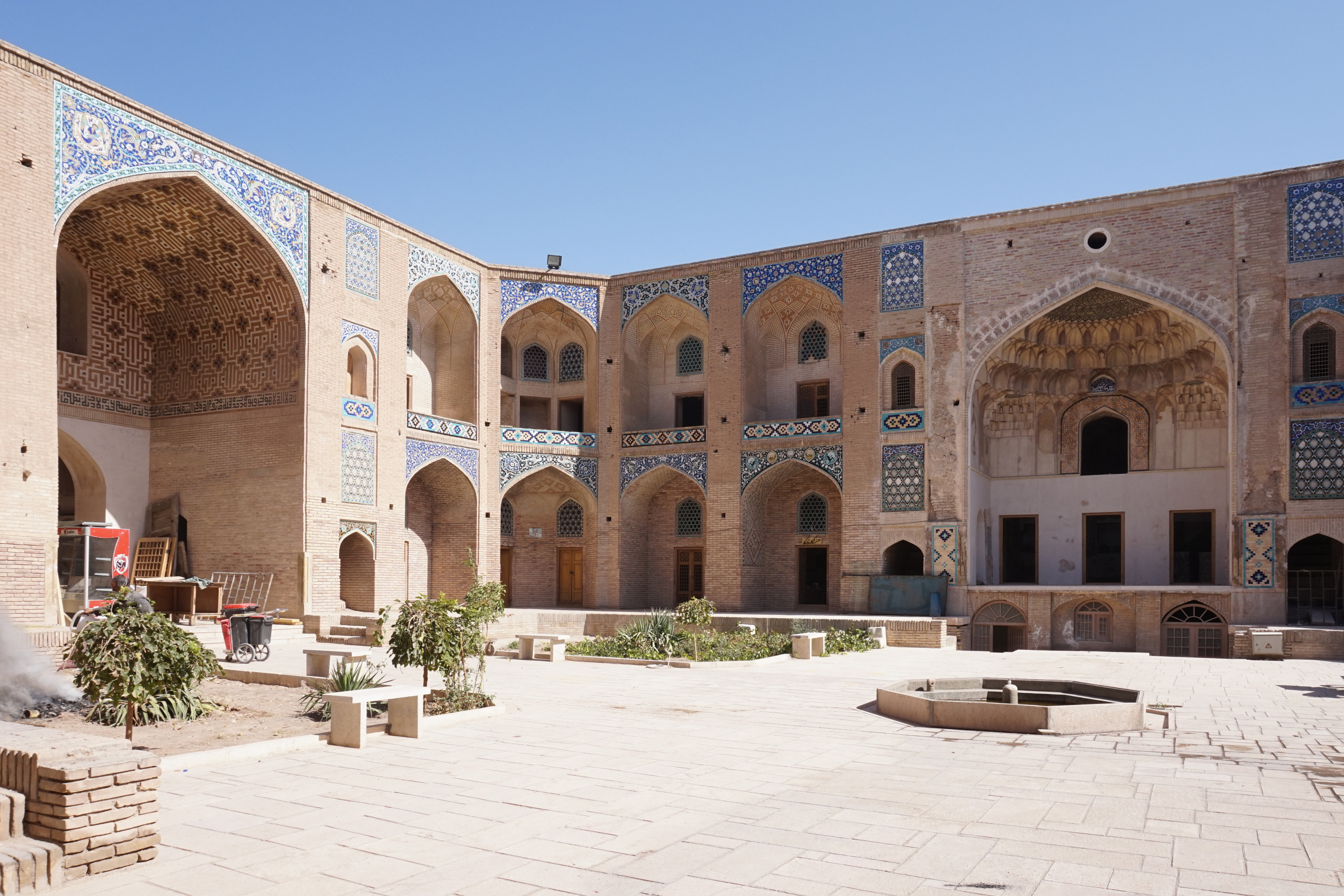
Ganjali Khan Caravanserai

The caravanserai is located on the east side of the Ganjali Square. Its portal bears a foundation inscription from 1598 composed by calligrapher Ali Reza Abbasi. The plan of the caravanserai is based on the four-iwan typology, with double-story halls centered on tall iwans enveloping four sides of an open courtyard. There is an octagonal fountain at the center of the courtyard which is chamfered at the corners. The caravanserai measures thirty-one and a half by twenty-three meters. It has a small domed mosque at one corner that measures five and a half by five meters.

=== Ganjali Khan Museum ===
The mint’s construction started in 1598 and ended in 1625. The interior decorations consist of ochre plasterwork and brickwork. The building has a tall dome crowned by a cupola to admit light and vent air. The mint was converted into a numismatics museum in 1970. The museum displays coins from different eras such as the Parthian, Sasanian, Safavid and Afsharid eras.

== Gallery ==
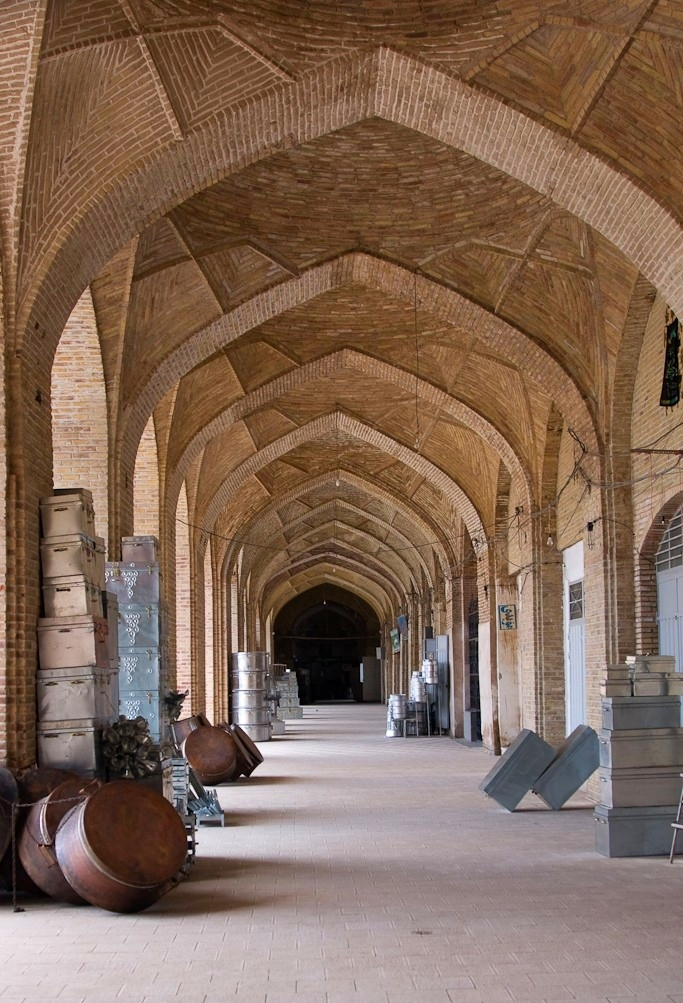
View of bazaar arcade flanking Ganjali Khan Square

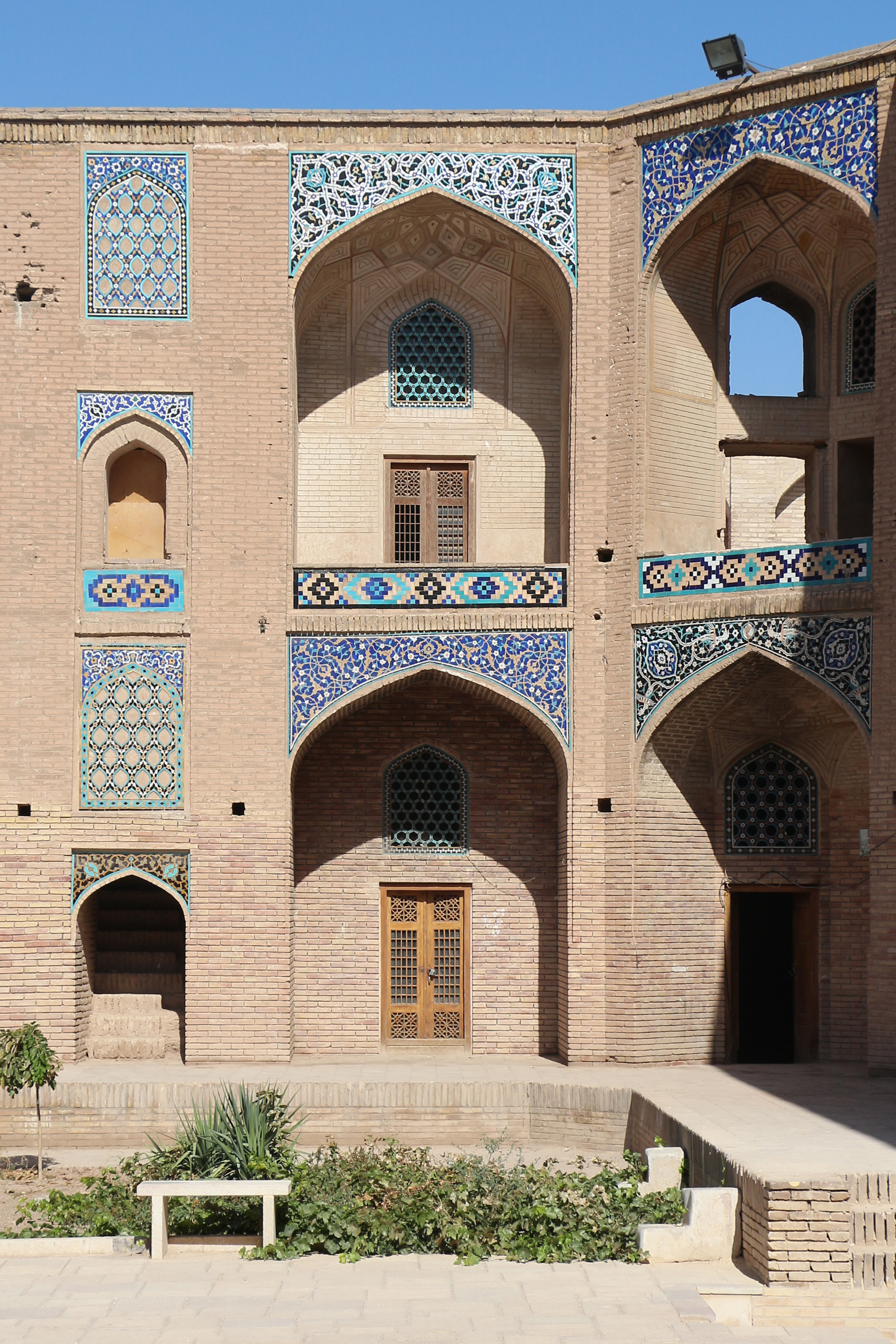
Ganjali Khan caravanserai

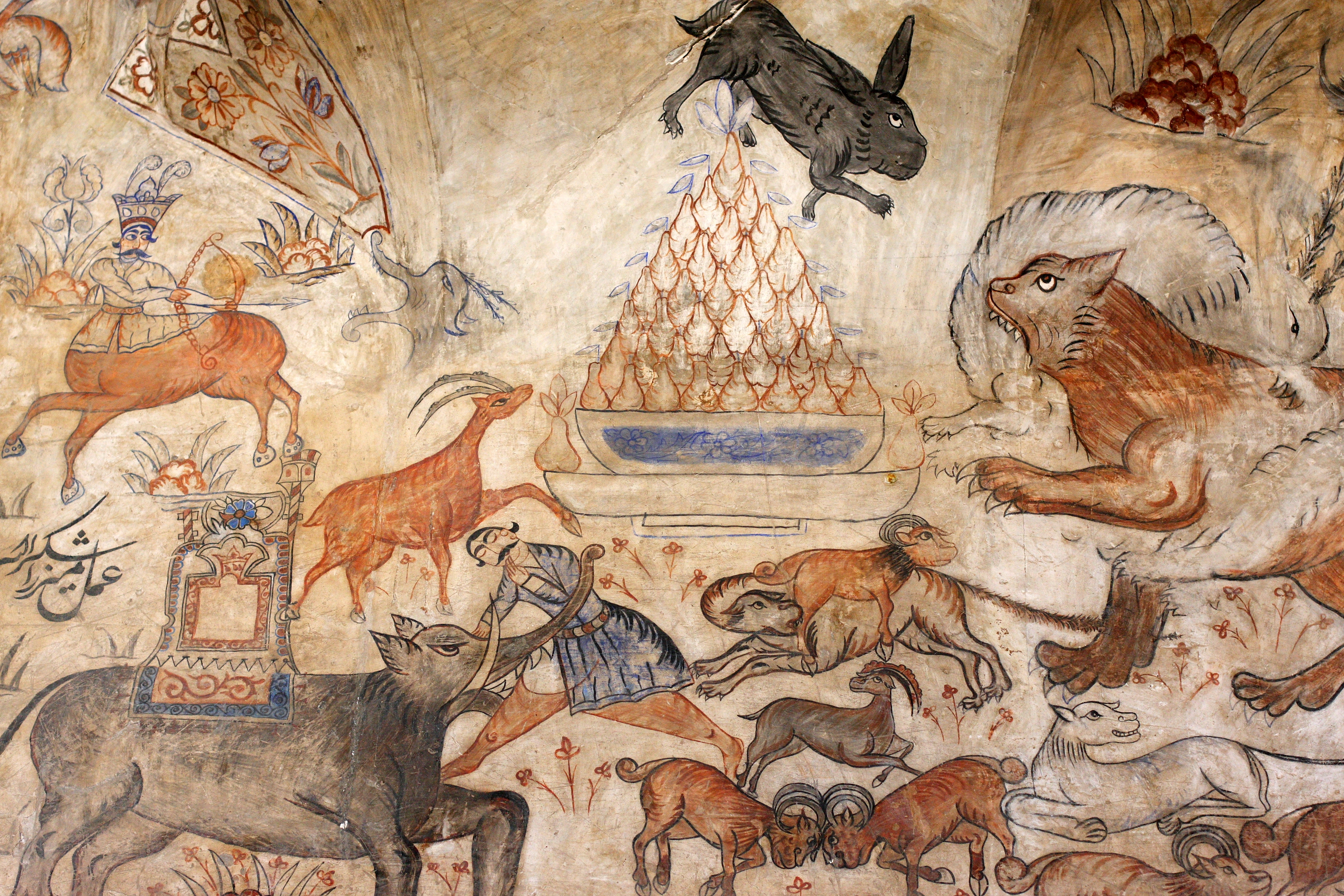
Frescoes in Ganjali Khan Bazaar

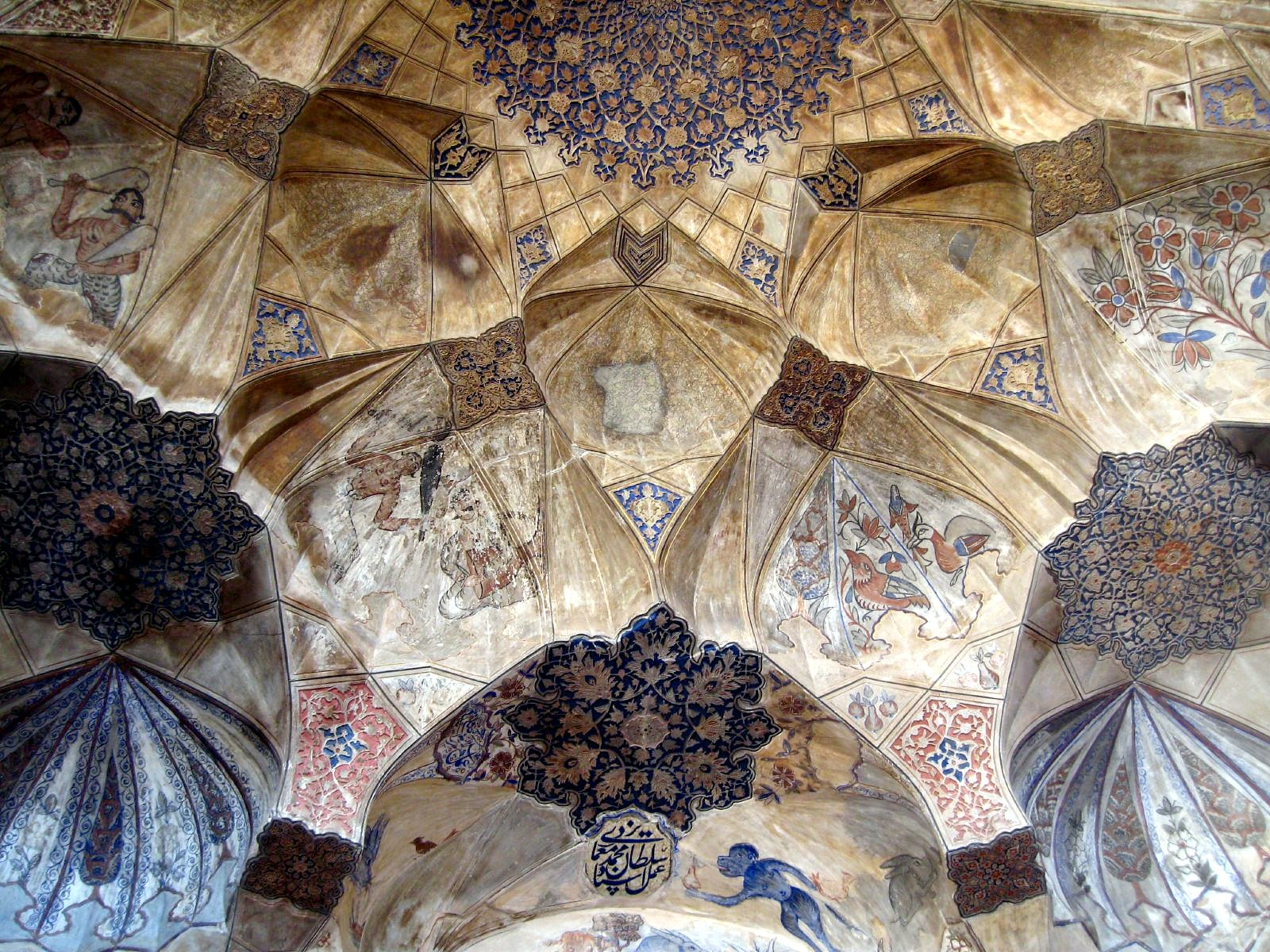
Frescoes in Ganjali Khan Bathhouse

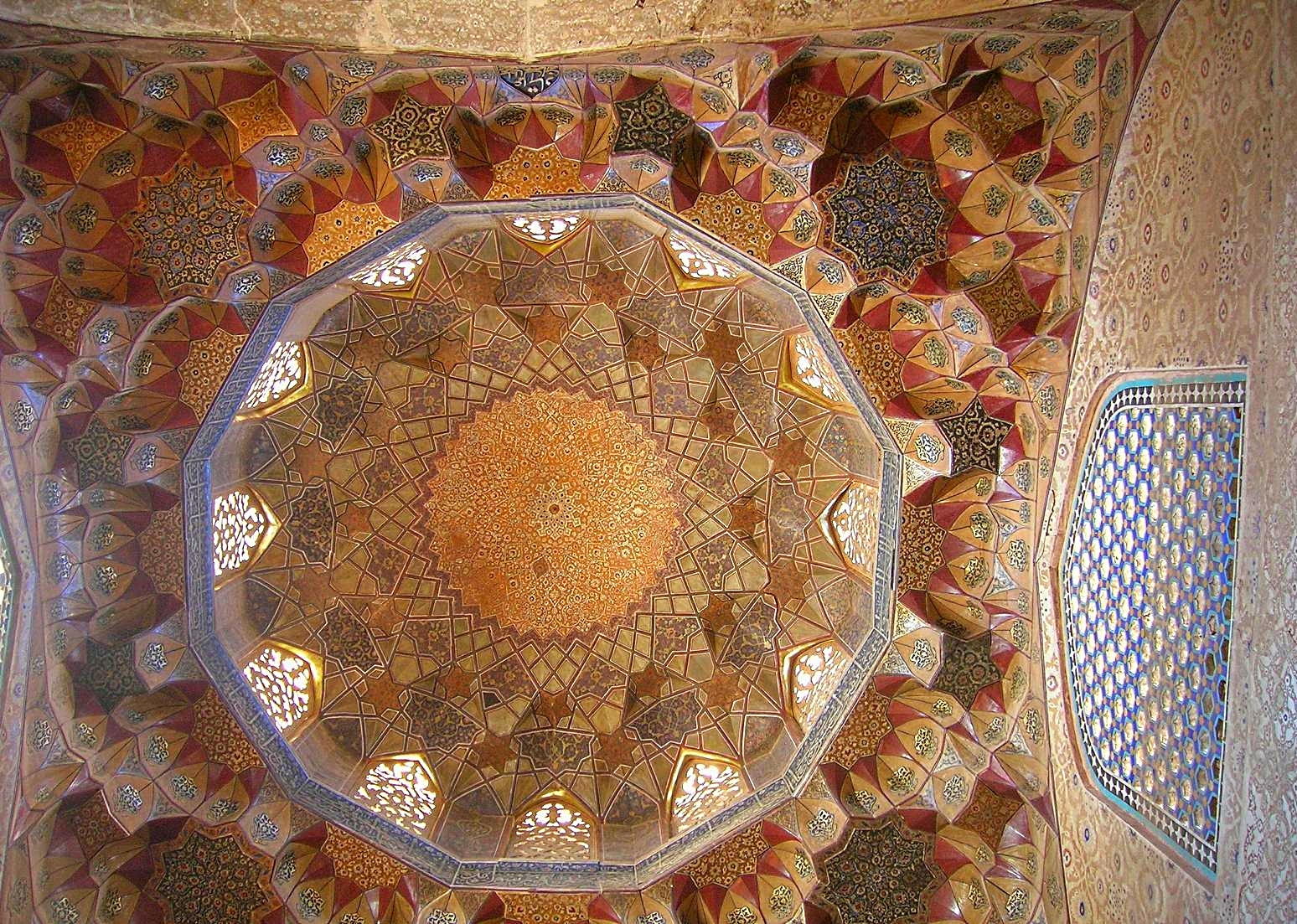
Inside view of Ganjali Khan Mosque

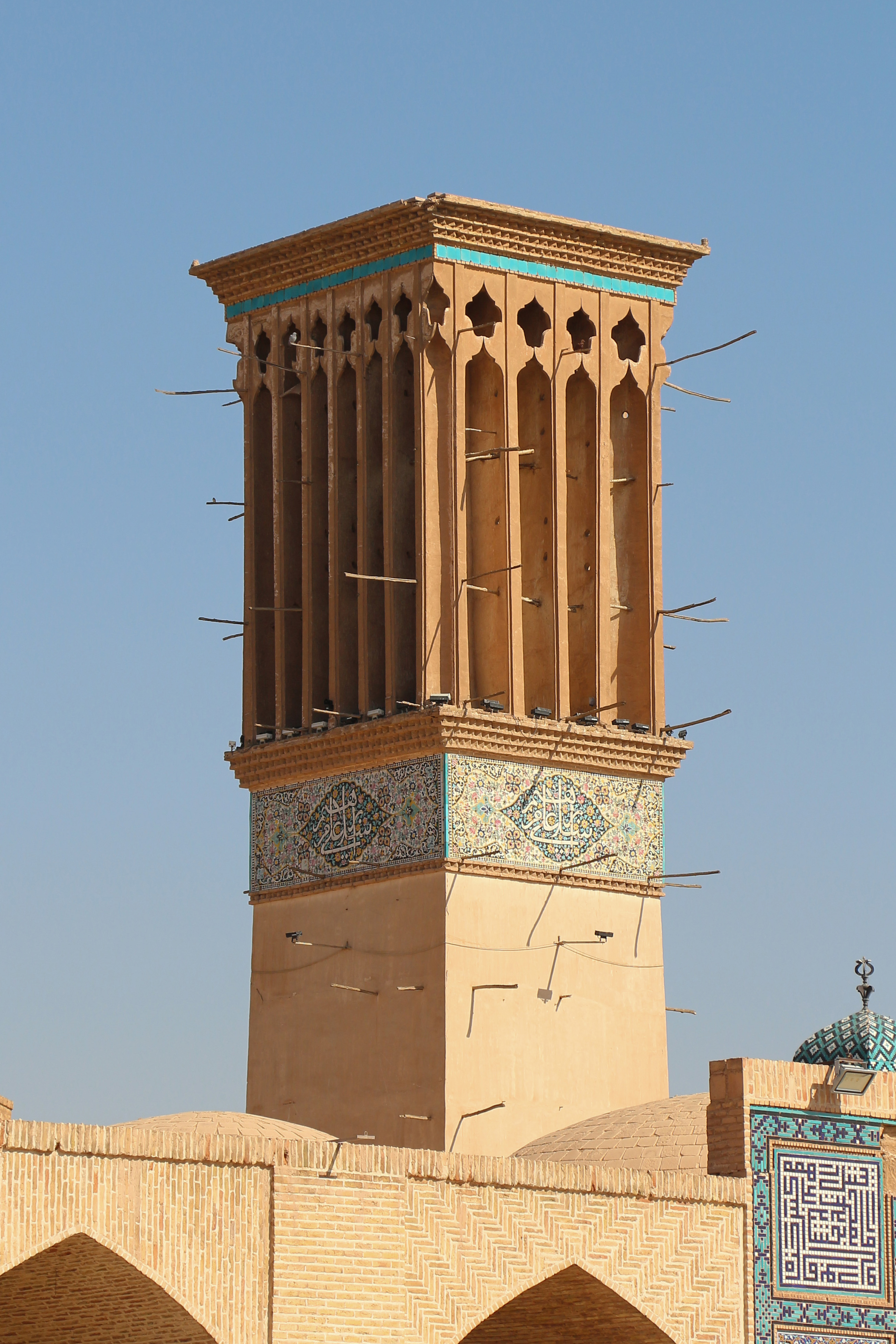
A windcatcher at the Ganjali Khan Complex

== See also ==
- Arabber
- Bazaar
- Bazaari
- Isfahani style
- Iranian Architecture
- Market (place)
- Naqsh-e Jahan Square
- Peddler
- Retail
- Safavid architecture
- Street vendor
- Street food
