= Tahmasp Qoli Khan =

Governor of Kerman
- In office 1624/25–1626
- Preceded by: Ganj Ali Khan
- Succeeded by: Amir Khan Zul-Qadr.

Personal details
- Died: 1626

Tahmasp Quli Khan (Persian: طهماسب قلی خان; died 1626) was an aristocrat, who served as the Safavid governor of Kerman from 1624/1625. He was succeeded by Amir Khan Zul-Qadr.

== Sources ==
- Matthee, Rudi (2014). "KERMAN vii. In the Safavid Period". Encyclopaedia Iranica.

Preceded by Ganj Ali Khan	Governor of Kerman; 1624/25 – 1626	Succeeded by Amir Khan Zul-Qadr
